= Pennsylvania Route 118 =

State highway in Lycoming, Columbia, and Luzerne counties in Pennsylvania, US

Pennsylvania Route 118

Route information
- Maintained by PennDOT
- Length: 42.248 mi (67.992 km)
- Existed: April 1961–present

Major junctions
- West end: PA 405 in Hughesville
- PA 42 near Unityville; PA 239 in Jordan Township; PA 487 near Fairmount Springs; PA 29 in Lake Township
- East end: PA 415 in Dallas Township

Location
- Country: United States
- State: Pennsylvania
- Counties: Lycoming, Columbia, Luzerne

Highway system
- Pennsylvania State Route System; Interstate; US; State; Scenic; Legislative
← PA 117	→ US 119

Pennsylvania Route 118 (PA 118) is a 42.248-mile-long (67.992 km) state route located in northeastern Pennsylvania. The western terminus of the route is at PA 405 in Hughesville. The eastern terminus is at PA 415 in Dallas. The road is known briefly as East Water Street from its western terminus to its intersection with 6th Street in Hughesville, where it becomes Lairdsville Road for 12 miles (19 km) until crossing PA 42 near Unityville. It joins PA 487 for one mile (1.6 km) in Red Rock, where it passes through the southern part of Ricketts Glen State Park. In 1928, the road between Hughesville and Unityville was designated as part of PA 642 while the portion between Red Rock and Lehman was designated as a portion of PA 115. PA 642 was extended from PA 42 in Unityville to PA 539 in the 1940s. During the 1950s, PA 115 was rerouted from Red Rock to head west and replace PA 642 to Hughesville. PA 115 was also realigned to run between Lehman and Dallas. In 1961, PA 118 replaced the portion of PA 115 between Hughesville and Dallas.

== Route description ==
=== Lycoming County ===
PA 118 begins at an intersection with PA 405 (Main Street) in the center of Hughesville in Lycoming County. The route progresses southeastward through the borough as East Water Street. The local street crosses a long stretch of commercial businesses before reaching North Fifth Street, where it turns to the east and crosses over Muncy Creek. After crossing the river, PA 118 changes names to Lairdsville Road and the surroundings become residential. The route there turns to the southeast once again, paralleling a long distance with Gregg Run Road. The surroundings quickly change to farmland, and PA 118 continues east through woodlands that begins soon after. At the intersection with Old Lairdsville Road, the route turns to the northeast until a short clearing, where the highway intersects with L Harman Road. At that intersection, the route turns to the southeast once again.

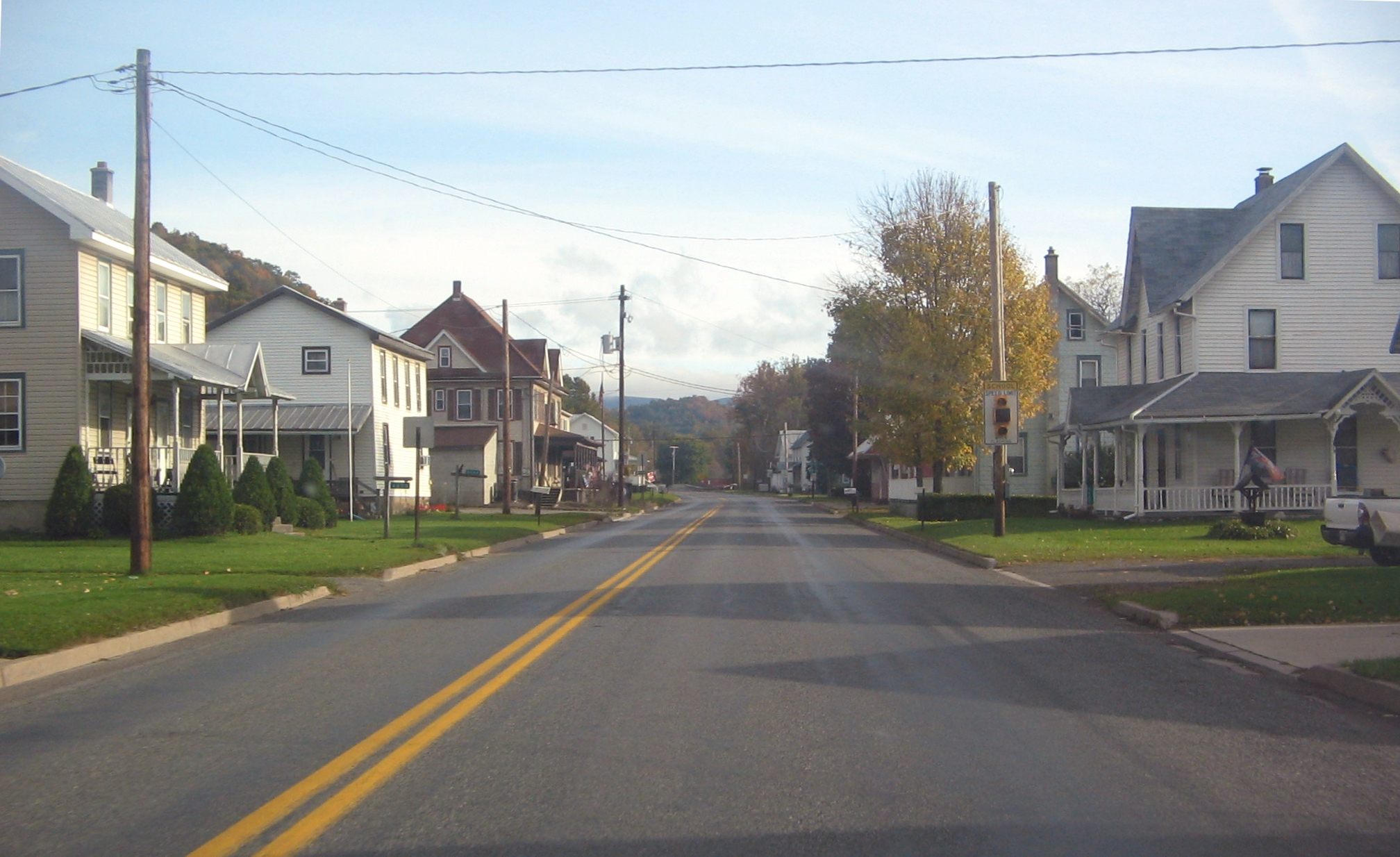
PA 118 as a two-lane road through the village of Lairdsville

Heading through now Moreland Township, the woodlands soon give way in favor of open fields, where the route intersects with Neuhard and Stan Warn Roads. There, PA 118 turns even further to the southeast and makes a large bend to the northeast later on, where the highway enters the hamlet of Frenchtown. The highway leaves the rural hamlet to the northeast, paralleling Old Lairdsville Road, which soon merges back in. The highway continues, leaving the fields for more woodlands, paralleling an old alignment of PA 118. A short distance after the old alignment stops paralleling, PA 118 breaks free of the woodlands in favor of the village of Lairdsville. Through Lairdsville, the highway passes a long stretch of residential homes and intersects with Dark Hollow Road. At Dark Hollow Road, PA 118 leaves Lairdsville and enters the rural segments of Franklin Township. Heading to the northeast through Franklin Township, PA 118 retains the name of Lairdsville Road, re-enters the nearby woods and makes a gradual curve back to the southeast. This soon returns to the northeast progression and the highway follows a sporadic stretch of eastern directions, entering Jordan Township. Entering the hamlet of Biggerstown, PA 118 curves eastward and intersects with PA 42. There the Lairdsville Road name ends, and PA 118 continues to the northeast through Jordan Township. The surroundings remain a mix of fields and woodlands, entering the hamlet of Richarts Grove. Richarts Grove has several residents far off the main highway, but has an intersection with North Woods Road, which connects to nearby PA 239. PA 118 continues northeast through the sporadic changes in surroundings before nearing the Columbia County line. Still in Lycoming County, PA 118 enters the hamlet of Divide, where it intersects at a cross with PA 239. After the intersection, both PA 239 and PA 118 enter Columbia County, heading different directions.

=== Columbia and Luzerne counties ===
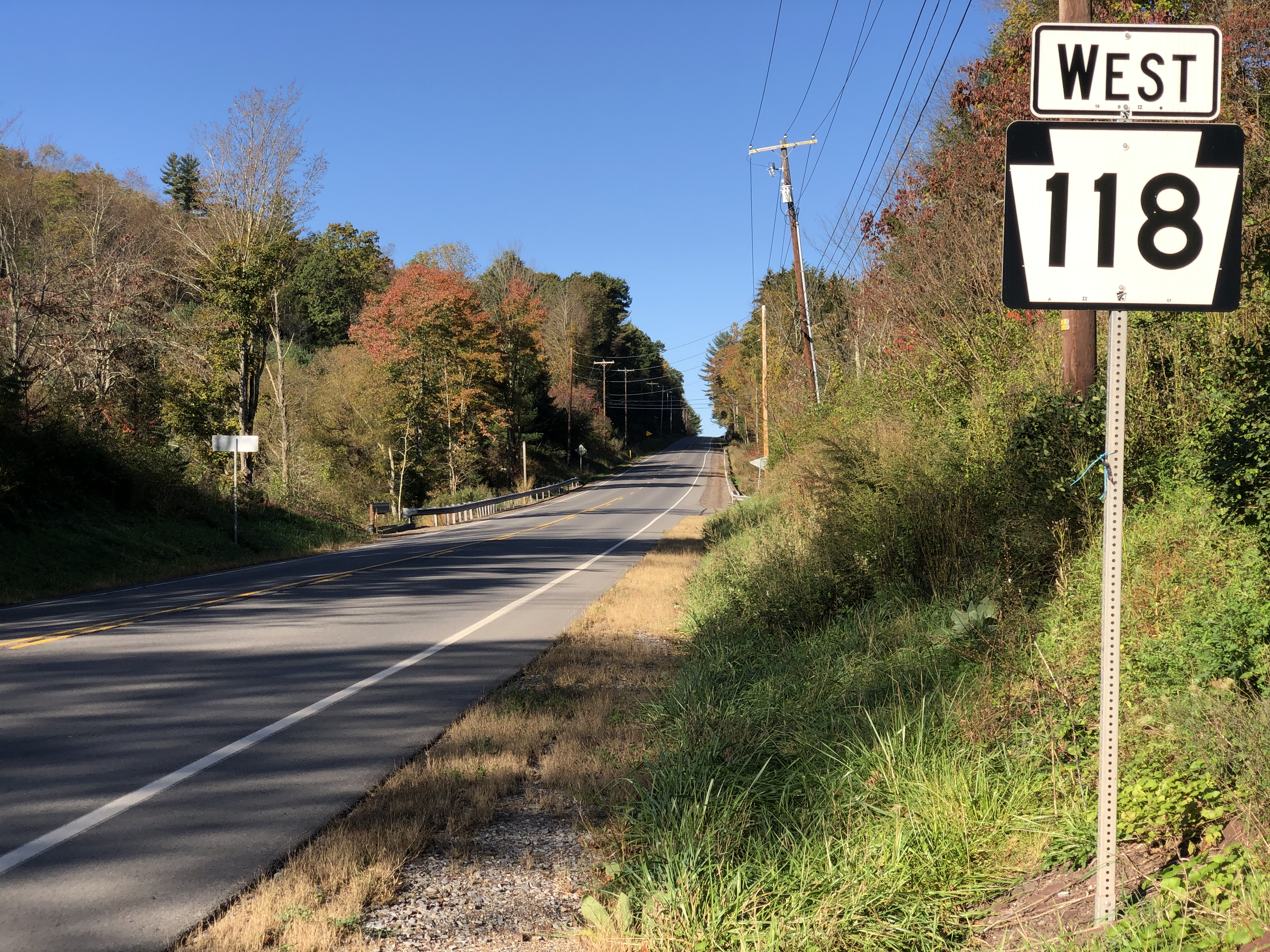
PA 118 westbound in Sugarloaf Township, Columbia County

Working its way away from PA 239, PA 118 heads to the northeast through now Jackson Township. The highway continues through the woodlands as a two-lane road, until intersecting with Mountain Road, where the woodlands give way to fields once again. After the intersection with Saddle Brook Road, another long patch of woodlands begins. PA 118, continuing eastward soon comes to another clearing, where it intersects with the northern terminus of Camp Lavigne Road (SR 4049). After intersecting with Schoolhouse Road, the highway re-enters the woodlands, crossing over several bodies of water and turns northeast into Sugarloaf Township. Through Sugarloaf Township, PA 118 parallels several side streets, including Township Road 737, which provides access to one residence. Passing to the south and north of two ponds, the highway begins a parallel and soon merges with PA 487. PA 118 and PA 487 head eastward through Sugarloaf Township, crossing the line into Luzerne County.

After entering Luzerne County, PA 118 and PA 487 intersect with County Line Road as they go through the hamlet of Fairmount Springs, a part of Fairmount Township. After entering the small hamlet of Red Rock, PA 487 forks to the north along Red Rock Mountain Road while PA 118 turns to the northeast and enters Ricketts Glen State Park. The highway heads eastward through the dense forestry of the park, crossing over Kitchen Creek. Right after leaving the park, PA 118 enters a large clearing, where Bethel Hill Road forks to the southeast. The highway winds through more dense woods, passing several roadside residences until turning to the northeast at Maransky Road. PA 118 soon enters the hamlet of Kyttle, where it intersects with the Kyttle Pike.

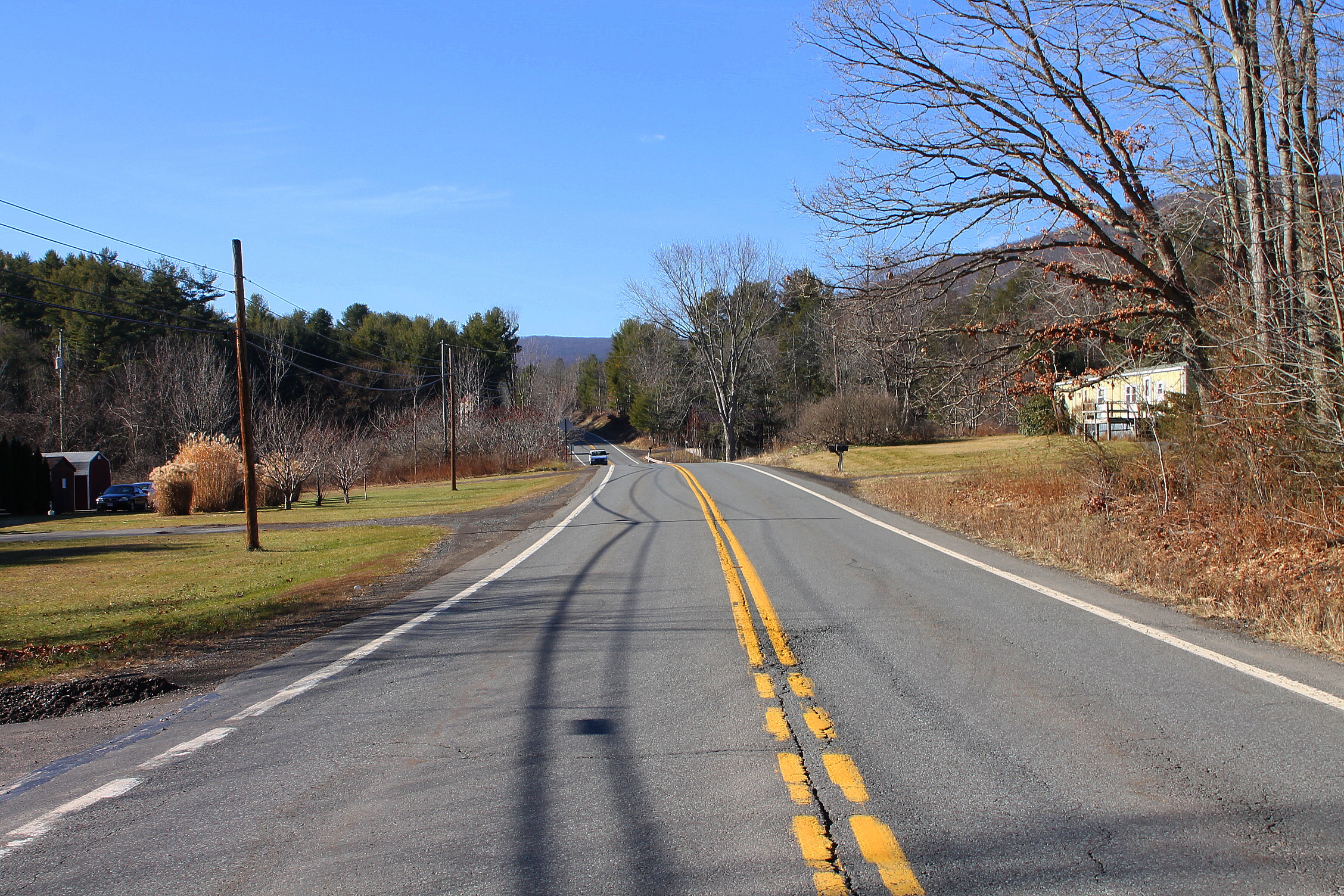
PA 118 west in Fairmount Township

Kyttle is a small hamlet of few residences and large fields, and PA 118 intersects with Mooretown Road as it enters Ross Township. Through Ross Township, residences become more common in the mix of fields and forests, along with the nearby alignment of Old State Road. At the intersection with Harris Pond Road, PA 118 passes to the south of the hamlet of Fades, turning southeastward into the hamlet of Pikes Creek as it enters the Back Mountain region of Luzerne County. Through the small downtown of Pikes Creek, PA 118 turns eastward at Gordon Road and intersects with PA 29. After PA 29, PA 118 passes some local businesses and leaves Pikes Creek, following a long stretch of residences and soon into fields.

PA 118 heads further to the northeast, paralleling Cornell Road into a long stretch of farmhouses and silos and into the community of Meeker. In Meeker, the highway intersects with Loyalville Road, where it turns southeastward once again until Fedor Road, where it returns to the northeast progression. PA 118 heads back into the dense forestry, entering Lehman Township, where an old alignment of PA 115 forks near the hamlet of Lehman. Through the hamlet portion, PA 118 passes a long stretch of houses and several side streets. The route continues northeast, and while the fields become more evident once again, PA 118 passes the Lehman Golf Club. PA 118 soon enters Dallas Township and the hamlet of Back Mountain, where a large farm is visible for the short distance to the eastern terminus, an intersection with PA 415 (Memorial Highway) in Back Mountain.

== History ==
When Pennsylvania first legislated routes in 1911, what is now PA 118 was designated as part of Legislative Route 239 between Hughesville and Unityville and as part of Legislative Route 177 between Red Rock and Lehman. In 1928, the road between Hughesville and Unityville was designated as part of PA 642 while the road between Red Rock and Lehman became part of PA 115. By this time, the entire road was unpaved except for the portion of PA 115 between Pikes Corner and Dallas. By 1930, a small section of PA 642 east of Hughesville was paved along with a portion of PA 115 west of Pikes Corner. During the 1930s, PA 642 was paved from east of Hughesville to east of Lairdsville and PA 115 was paved between Red Rock and west of Pikes Corner. PA 642 was paved from east of Lairdsville to PA 42 while it was extended east from there to PA 539 (now PA 239) in the 1940s. By 1950, a new alignment of PA 115 between Lehman and PA 415 in Dallas was proposed.

During the 1950s, a paved road was built between the intersection of PA 539 and PA 642 and PA 115 west of Red Rock. This road became a rerouted PA 115, which continued west to Hughesville along the former alignment of PA 642. In addition, PA 115 was rerouted to follow the new alignment from Lehman to PA 415 in Dallas, where it turned southeast and picked up a concurrency with U.S. Route 309 (US 309). In April 1961, the portion of PA 115 between PA 405 in Hughesville and PA 415 in Dallas was renumbered to PA 118 in order to give this stretch of east-west road an even number; the northern terminus of PA 115 was cut back to US 309 southeast of Wilkes-Barre.

== Major intersections ==
County	Location	mi	km	Destinations	Notes
Lycoming	Hughesville	0.000	0.000	PA 405 (Main Street) – Muncy, Williamsport, Dushore	Western terminus
Lycoming	Jordan Township	12.253	19.719	PA 42 – Eagles Mere, Unityville, Bloomsburg	
Lycoming	Jordan Township	16.374	26.351	PA 239 – Eagles Mere, Laporte, Benton	
Columbia	Sugarloaf Township	23.637	38.040	PA 487 south – Benton	Western terminus of concurrency with PA 487
Luzerne	Fairmount Township	24.419	39.299	PA 487 north – Lopez, Dushore	Eastern terminus of concurrency with PA 487
Luzerne	Lake Township	35.634	57.347	PA 29 – Tunkhannock, Nanticoke	
Luzerne	Dallas Township	42.248	67.992	PA 415 (Memorial Highway) – Harveys Lake, Wilkes-Barre	Eastern terminus
1.000 mi = 1.609 km; 1.000 km = 0.621 mi: Concurrency terminus
