= Pennsylvania Route 487 =

State highway in Pennsylvania, United States

Pennsylvania Route 487

Route information
- Maintained by PennDOT
- Length: 64.244 mi (103.391 km)

Major junctions
- South end: PA 61 in Paxinos
- PA 54 in Elysburg; PA 42 in Catawissa; US 11 in Bloomsburg; I-80 in Lightstreet; PA 93 in Orangeville; PA 254 in Benton Township; PA 239 in Benton; PA 118 in Sugarloaf Township
- North end: PA 87 in Dushore

Location
- Country: United States
- State: Pennsylvania
- Counties: Northumberland, Columbia, Luzerne, Sullivan

Highway system
- Pennsylvania State Route System; Interstate; US; State; Scenic; Legislative
← PA 484	→ PA 488
← PA 741	→ PA 743

Pennsylvania Route 487 (PA 487) is a 64.2-mile-long (103.3 km), north–south state highway running from PA 61 in Shamokin Township, Northumberland County, to PA 87 (near its intersection with US 220) in Dushore, Sullivan County. In Bloomsburg, PA 487 and US 11 share a brief wrong-way concurrency. After its brief concurrency with PA 118, PA 487 goes up a steep grade through Ricketts Glen State Park. PA 487 is used to carry traffic up the Fishing Creek valley.

== Route description ==
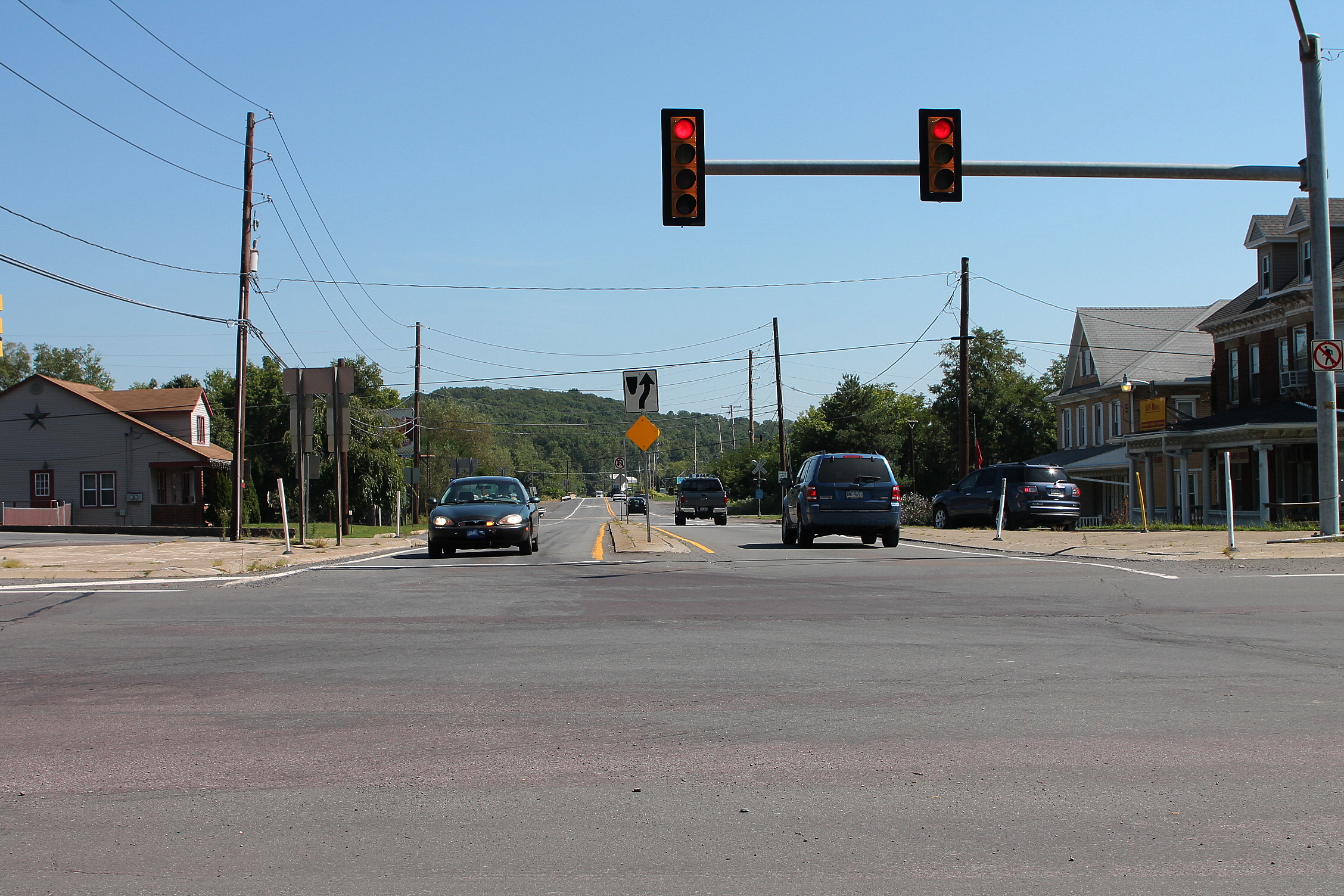
PA 487 at its southern terminus at PA 61 in Paxinos, looking north

PA 487 begins at an intersection with PA 61 in the community of Paxinos in Shamokin Township, Northumberland County, heading northeast on a two-lane undivided road. The route heads through commercial areas, crossing the Shamokin Valley Railroad before heading across the Shamokin Creek into Ralpho Township, where it becomes West Valley Avenue. The road passes more businesses and continues into a mix of farmland, woodland, and homes. PA 487 reaches the community of Elysburg where it intersects PA 54. After this, the road becomes East Valley Avenue and runs through more agricultural and wooded areas with a few residences, becoming an unnamed road. The route heads into woodland and eventually arrives at Knoebels Amusement Resort.

At Knoebels, PA 487 crosses the South Branch Roaring Creek into Franklin Township, Columbia County and turns more to the north, heading through wooded areas to the east of the creek. The road curves east and becomes Southern Drive, heading into open agricultural areas with some homes and crossing Roaring Creek. The route turns to the northeast and runs through more farmland with some woods and residences. PA 487 enters Catawissa Township and continues into more wooded areas, coming to an intersection with PA 42. At this point, PA 487 joins PA 42 for a concurrency, with the two routes heading north through more woodland on Numidia Drive. The road crosses the Catawissa Creek into the borough of Catawissa and becomes Mill Street, heading northwest into residential areas. PA 42 splits from PA 487 by heading west-northwest on Main Street, with PA 487 continuing north-northeast onto North 4th Street, passing more homes. The route turns northeast onto Merceron Street and leaves Catawissa for Catawissa Township again, becoming Riverhill Drive and heading into open farmland with some residences. The road curves to the north and passes through the neighborhood of Breezy Acres, heading into more wooded areas of homes and turning to the northwest. PA 487 runs through dense forests before coming to a bridge that carries it over Norfolk Southern's Sunbury Line and across the Susquehanna River as the East Bloomsburg Bridge, also known as Ferry Road.

Upon crossing the river, the road heads into the town of Bloomsburg and becomes Ferry Avenue, passing to the west of Bloomsburg Municipal Airport. The route continues into residential areas and becomes Poplar Street before turning onto East Street and heading past a few businesses. PA 487 crosses the North Shore Railroad and intersects US 11, at which point that route joins PA 487. The road continues northwest past homes, coming to the commercial downtown of Bloomsburg. Here, US 11 turns southwest onto East Main Street and PA 487 turns northeast onto Lightstreet Road, lined with more homes. The road passes south of Bloomsburg Hospital and heads to the north of the Bloomsburg University of Pennsylvania campus. The route passes a few more residences and crosses into Scott Township, where it heads into a mix of farmland, woodland, and homes. PA 487 widens into a four-lane divided highway as it comes to an interchange with I-80 in a commercial area.

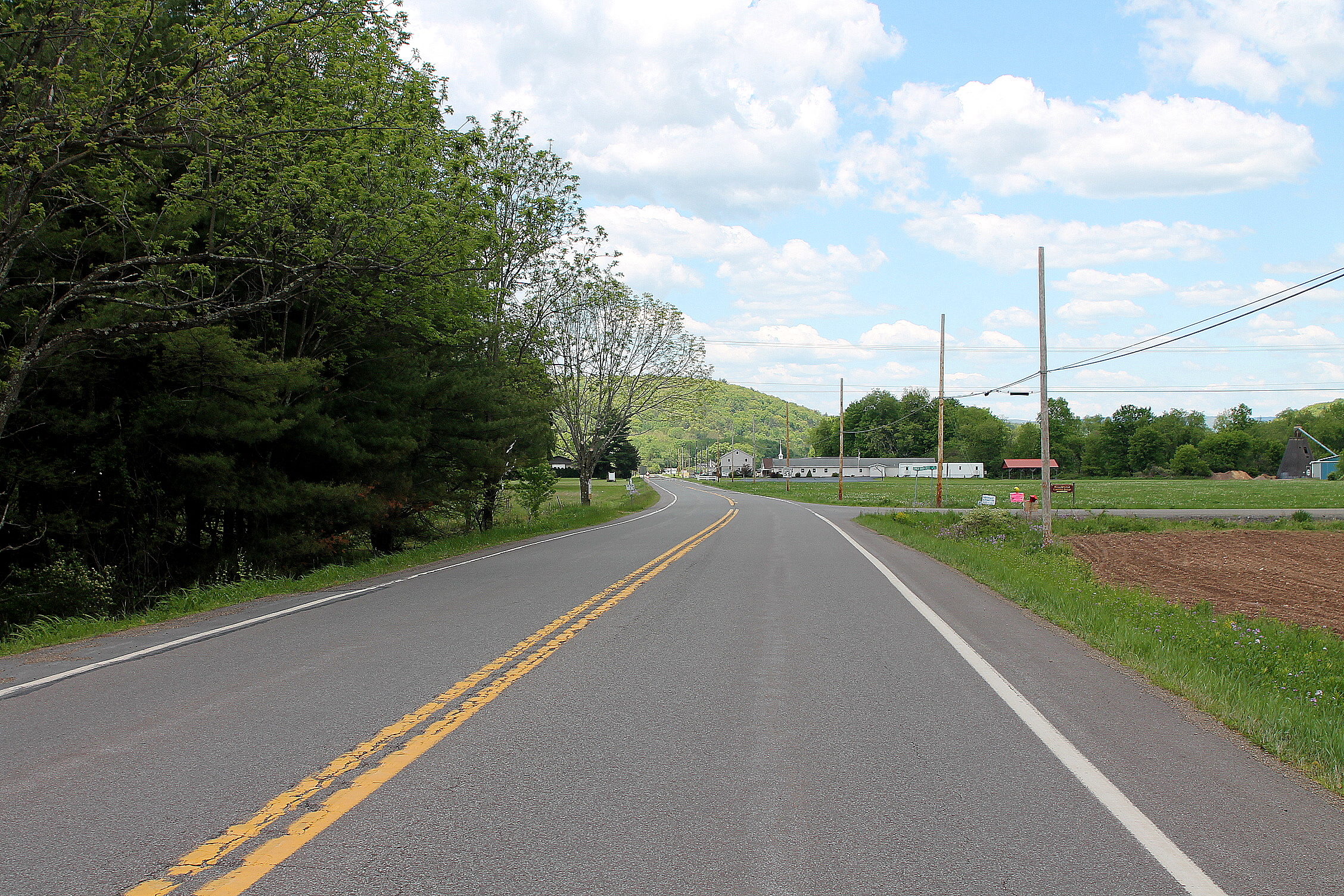
PA 487 looking northwards in Stillwater, Columbia County

Past this interchange, the route becomes two lanes and undivided again, becoming Main Street and heading north into areas of farms, woods, and residences, passing through the community of Light Street. The road enters Orange Township and runs along the east bank of Fishing Creek, heading through wooded areas with some farm fields and homes. PA 487 turns east away from the creek and heads into open farmland with some woods and residences. The road curves north again and heads into the borough of Orangeville, running past homes as it intersects the northern terminus of PA 93. The route heads northeast through more of the town before crossing back into Orange Township, where it becomes an unnamed road that heads through forests to the southeast of Fishing Creek. PA 487 crosses the creek and continues through a mix of farmland and woodland with some homes. The road heads more to the east and enters Fishing Creek Township, running through open farmland before turning north into woods to the west of Fishing Creek, passing through Forks. The route heads through more agricultural areas with some woodland and residences, crossing into the borough of Stillwater. In the borough, PA 487 passes through more rural areas before heading near a few homes and turning northwest, crossing Fishing Creek again. The road continues through more farmland with some homes, heading back into Fishing Creek Township again before entering Benton Township. Here, the route becomes Maple Grove Road and heads north through rural areas of homes, intersecting the eastern terminus of PA 254.

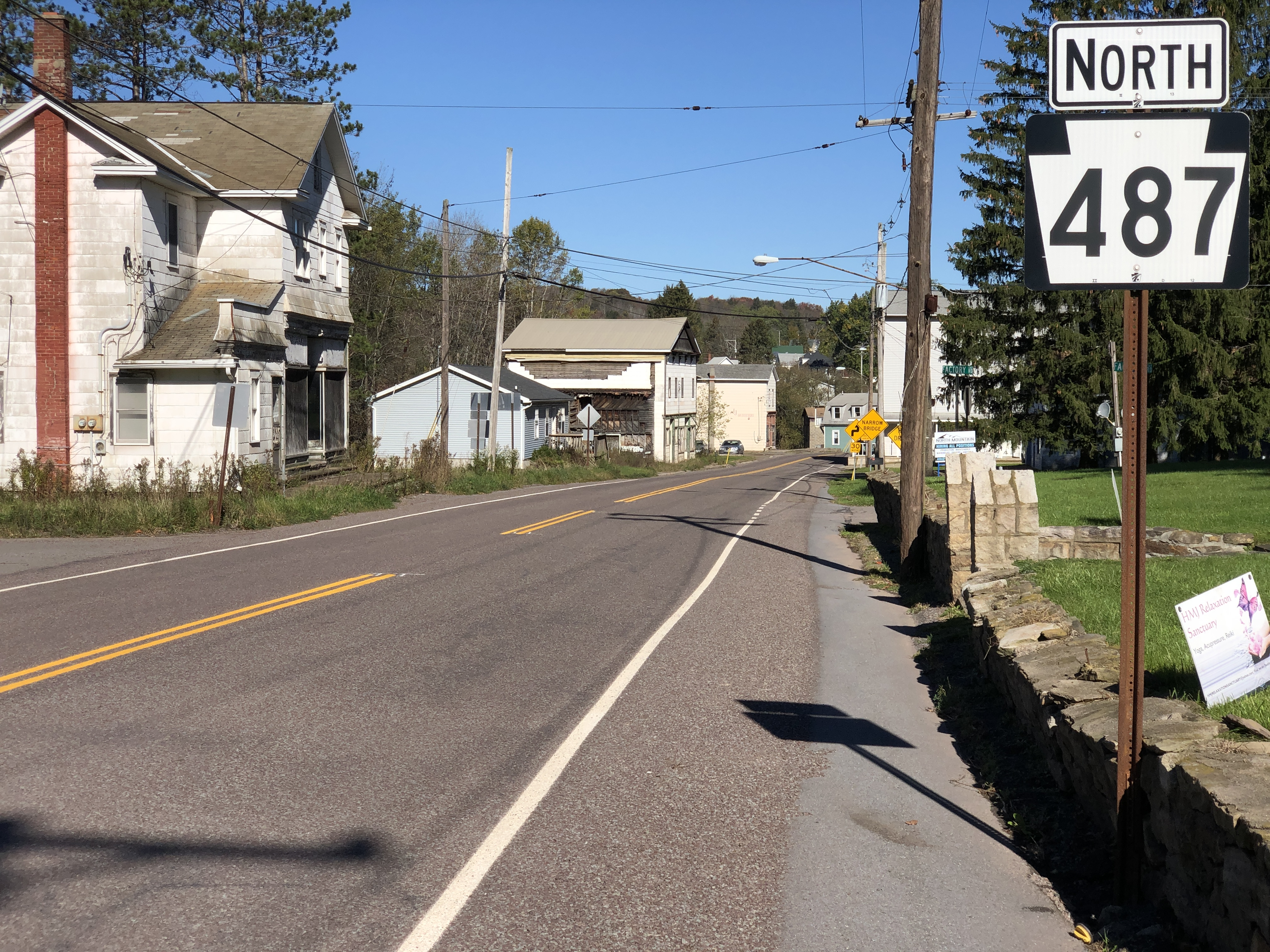
PA 487 northbound in Cherry Township

PA 487 runs through more agricultural areas with some residences, heading into the borough of Benton. At this point, the road becomes Mill Street and passes homes, coming to an intersection with PA 239. Here, PA 239 turns north to join the route, crossing the Fishing Creek and becoming Main Street, passing businesses in the center of town. The road heads through more residential areas before crossing back into Benton Township and running through rural areas of homes and businesses. PA 239 splits to the northwest and PA 487 continues through farmland with some and homes as Red Rock Road. The road crosses the creek again and heads through Coles Mills, heading into more wooded areas with some farm fields and residences to the east of Fishing Creek. The route continues into Sugarloaf Township and passes through Coles Creek, heading northeast through more rural areas away from the creek. PA 487 heads into dense forests with occasional development, passing through Tri Mills. Farther northeast, the route comes to an intersection with PA 118 and turns east to join that route on an unnamed road.

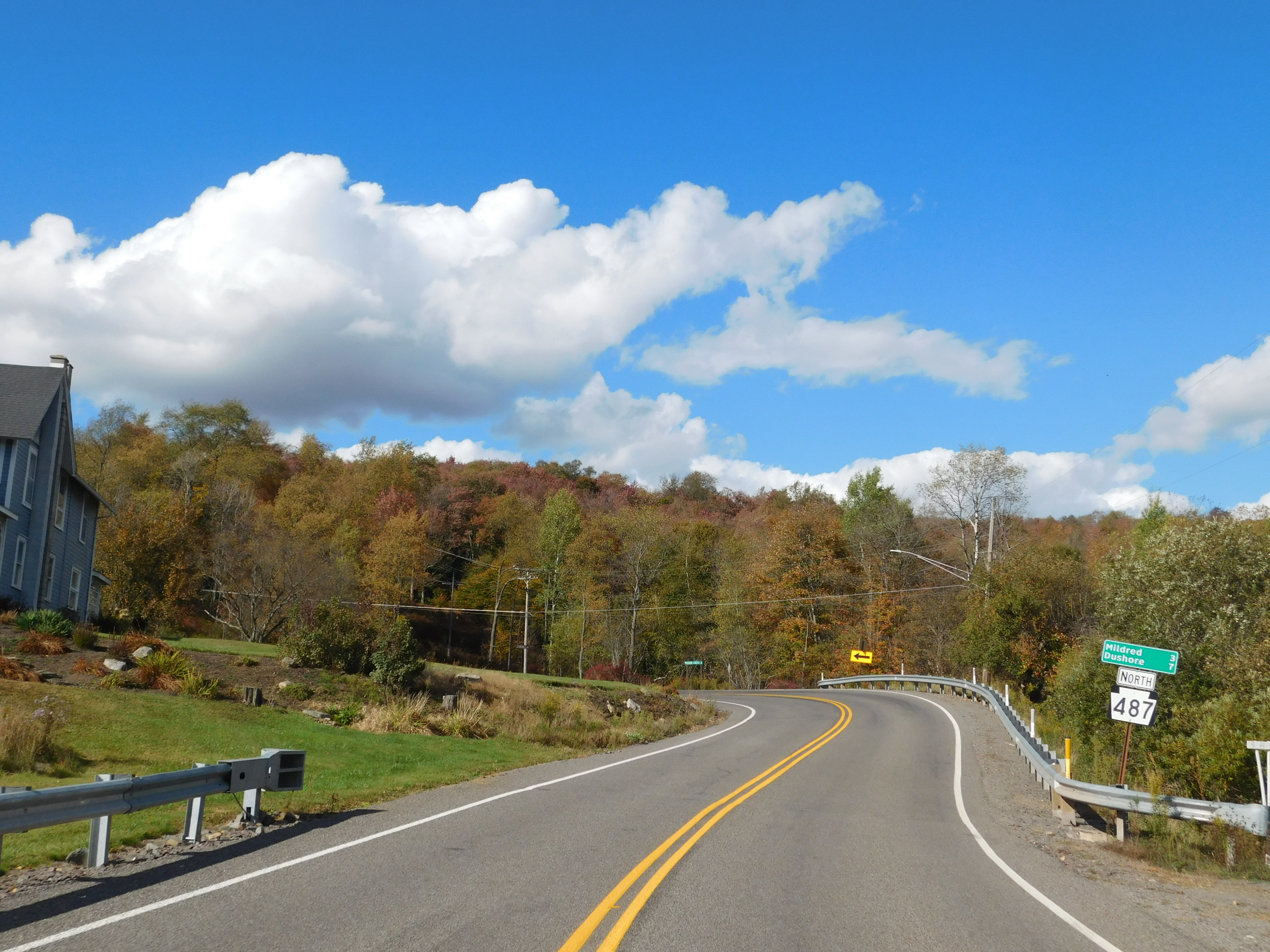
PA 487 northbound near Mildred

The road enters Fairmount Township in Luzerne County and runs through more wooded areas with some fields before PA 487 splits from PA 118 by heading north. The route continues into dense forests and crosses North Mountain, heading into Ricketts Glen State Park.

PA 487 crosses into Sullivan County where it becomes the border between Davidson Township to the west and Colley Township to the east, heading through more forested areas of the state park. The road fully enters Colley Township and passes to the west of Lake Jean, continuing along the western border of Ricketts Glen State Park. Past the state park, the route heads through more dense forest and passes through Ricketts, curving to the northwest. PA 487 heads into wooded areas with some fields and homes, curving west and coming to the community of Lopez. Here, the route turns north and crosses Loyalsock Creek, continuing northwest into more dense forests. The road becomes the border between Cherry Township to the southwest and Colley Township to the northeast before fully entering Cherry Township and curving to the west. The route turns north and passes through the residential community of Mildred, continuing through more woodland with some farm fields and homes. PA 487 curves northwest into farmland with some woods and homes, entering the borough of Dushore as Bernice Road and reaching its northern terminus at PA 87.

== History ==
Pennsylvania Route 487 was signed in 1928. In 1932, the road was paved from the community of Lopez to the border of Luzerne County. The section of PA 487 between U.S. Route 122 and PA 242 in Paxinos was originally PA 742. This designation was eliminated in favor of PA 242 in December 1962. This designation was removed in favor of PA 487 in May 1966. In 1967, the southern terminus was moved again, this time to its current location.

== Major intersections ==
County	Location	mi	km	Destinations	Notes
Northumberland	Shamokin Township	0.000	0.000	PA 61 – Shamokin, Sunbury	Southern terminus
Northumberland	Ralpho Township	2.318	3.730	PA 54 (Market Street) – Danville, Mount Carmel	
Columbia	Catawissa	11.490	18.491	PA 42 south (Numidia Drive) – Numidia, Centralia	South end of PA 42 concurrency
Columbia	Catawissa	12.193	19.623	PA 42 north (Main Street) – Bloomsburg	North end of PA 42 concurrency
Columbia	Bloomsburg	17.041	27.425	US 11 north (Columbia Boulevard) – Berwick	South end of US 11 concurrency
Columbia	Bloomsburg	17.414	28.025	US 11 south (Main Street) – Danville	North end of US 11 concurrency
Columbia	Bloomsburg	19.487– 19.720	31.361– 31.736	I-80 – Williamsport, Hazleton	I-80 exit 236; partial cloverleaf interchange
Columbia	Orangeville	24.174	38.904	PA 93 south (Berwick Road) – Berwick	Northern terminus of PA 93
Columbia	Benton Township	33.452	53.836	PA 254 west – Millville	Eastern terminus of PA 254
Columbia	Benton	34.500	55.522	PA 239 south (Shickshinny Road) – Shickshinny	South end of PA 239 concurrency
Columbia	Benton Township	35.595	57.285	PA 239 north	North end of PA 239 concurrency
Columbia	Sugarloaf Township	42.354	68.162	PA 118 west – Hughesville	South end of PA 118 concurrency
Luzerne	Fairmount Township	43.142	69.430	PA 118 east – Wilkes-Barre	North end of PA 118 concurrency
Sullivan	Dushore	64.244	103.391	PA 87 (Carpenter Street/Mill Street) to US 220 – Forksville, Mehoopany	Northern terminus
1.000 mi = 1.609 km; 1.000 km = 0.621 mi: Concurrency terminus
