= Numidia (disambiguation) =

Numidia was a kingdom in northwest Africa between the 3rd and 1st centuries BC.

Numidia may also refer to:

- Numidia (Roman province), created out of the former kingdom
- Numidia, Pennsylvania, a census-designated place
- Numidia (olive oil), an Algerian brand

== See also ==
- Numidian
