= Pennsylvania Route 239 =

State highway in Pennsylvania, US

Pennsylvania Route 239

Route information
- Maintained by PennDOT and Luzerne County
- Length: 36.842 mi (59.291 km)

Major junctions
- South end: PA 93 in Nescopeck Township
- US 11 in Shickshinny; PA 487 in Benton; PA 118 on the Columbia-Lycoming county border
- North end: PA 42 in North Mountain

Location
- Country: United States
- State: Pennsylvania
- Counties: Luzerne, Columbia, Lycoming

Highway system
- Pennsylvania State Route System; Interstate; US; State; Scenic; Legislative
← PA 238	→ PA 240
← PA 536	PA 539	→ PA 541

Pennsylvania Route 239 (PA 239) is a 36.84-mile-long (59.29 km) state highway located in Luzerne, Columbia and Lycoming counties in Pennsylvania. The southern terminus is at PA 93 in Nescopeck Township. The northern terminus is at PA 42 in North Mountain. The route heads north from PA 93 and parallels the Susquehanna River between Wapwallopen and Mocanaqua before crossing the river into Shickshinny and forming a concurrency with U.S. Route 11 (US 11). Past Shickshinny, PA 239 runs west through rural areas to Benton, where it has a concurrency with PA 487. The route continues northwest and crosses PA 118 before it reaches its northern terminus.

PA 239 was designated in 1928 between US 11 in Shickshinny and PA 339 (now PA 487) in Benton. At this time, a portion of PA 393 was designated on the road between Wapwallopen and Mocanaqua while PA 539 was designated between PA 339 in Benton and PA 42 in North Mountain. A section of PA 29 was designated onto the road between PA 93 and Shickshinny in the 1930s, replacing that portion of PA 393. PA 239 was extended to its current length in the 1960s, replacing the portion of PA 29 between PA 93 and Shickshinny and the entire length of PA 539.

== Route description ==
=== Luzerne County ===
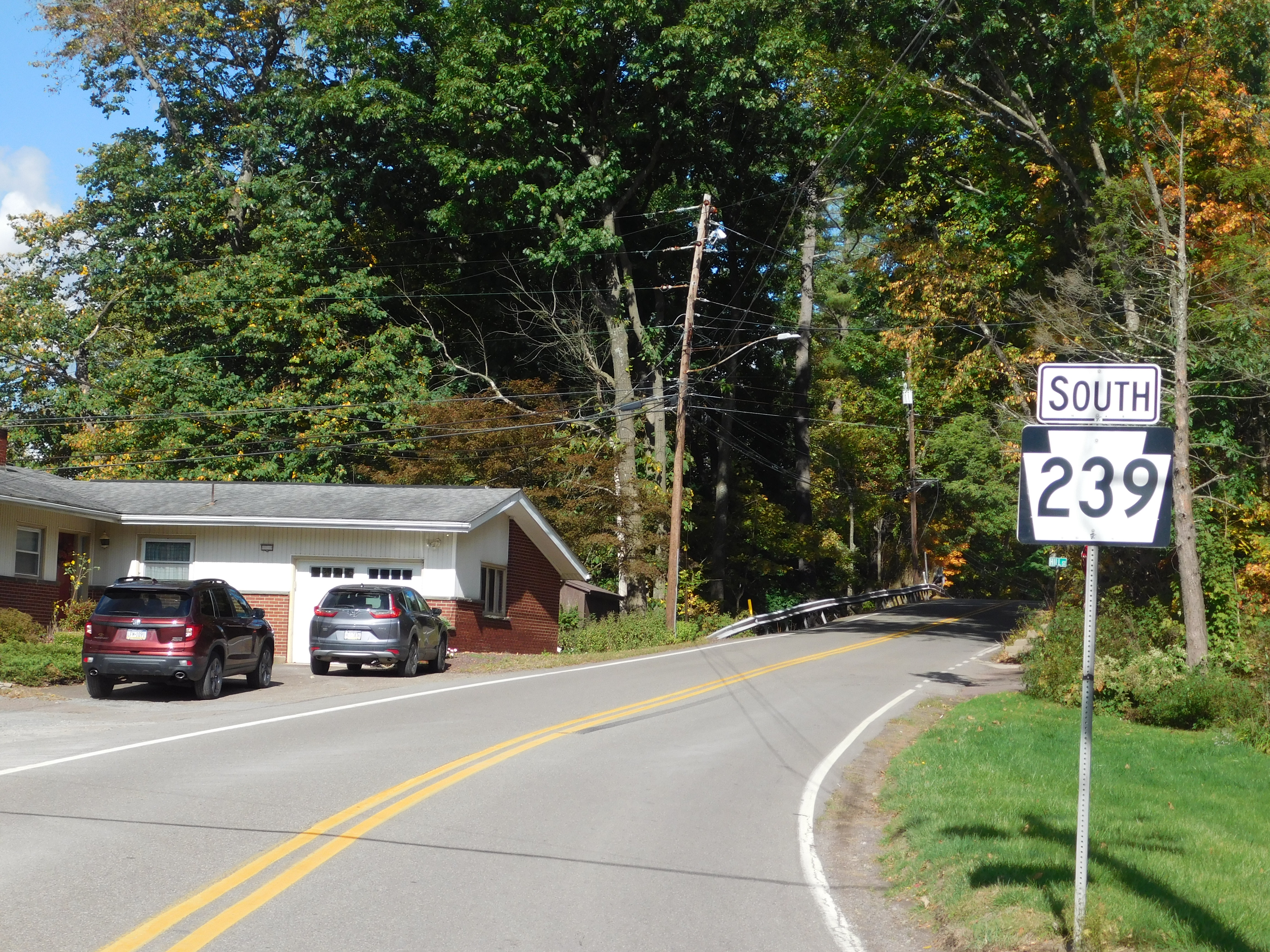
PA 239 southbound from PA 487 in Benton

PA 239 begins at an intersection with PA 93 (Berwick Hazleton Highway) in Nescopeck Township. The route progresses eastward through the rural areas east of Nescopeck as Hobbie Road, entering the small community of Briggsville, made up mostly of farms. After leaving Briggsville, PA 239 intersects with Wapwallopen Road, where the designation turns off of Hobbie Road and onto Wapwallopen Road. Now heading northward, the highway goes through a stretch of residential homes and soon into a long stretch of farmlands until the intersection with East Cherry Road, where PA 239 makes a gradual curve into woodlands surrounding Wapwallopen Creek. Paralleling the creek, the highway crosses some power lines and heads westward through dense forests until reaching a switchback turn and enters Wapwallopen. At the intersection with River Road, PA 239 turns eastward and enters the short downtown of Wapwallopen. Through Wapwallopen, the highway turns northward, passing the rural community and paralleling the nearby Susquehanna River and Norfolk Southern's Sunbury Line. PA 239 heads northward through a mix of woods and fields until following the riverbank of the Susquehanna and the railroad tracks directly. PA 239 soon gains the designation of Pond Hill Road and enters the community of Mocanaqua. The highway passes through mostly residences on the eastern side of the community before darting west on Main Street, which soon turns to the north again. PA 239 continues on Main Street until passing under the Sunbury Line and crossing the Susquehanna River into the community of Dogtown, where it intersects with US 11.

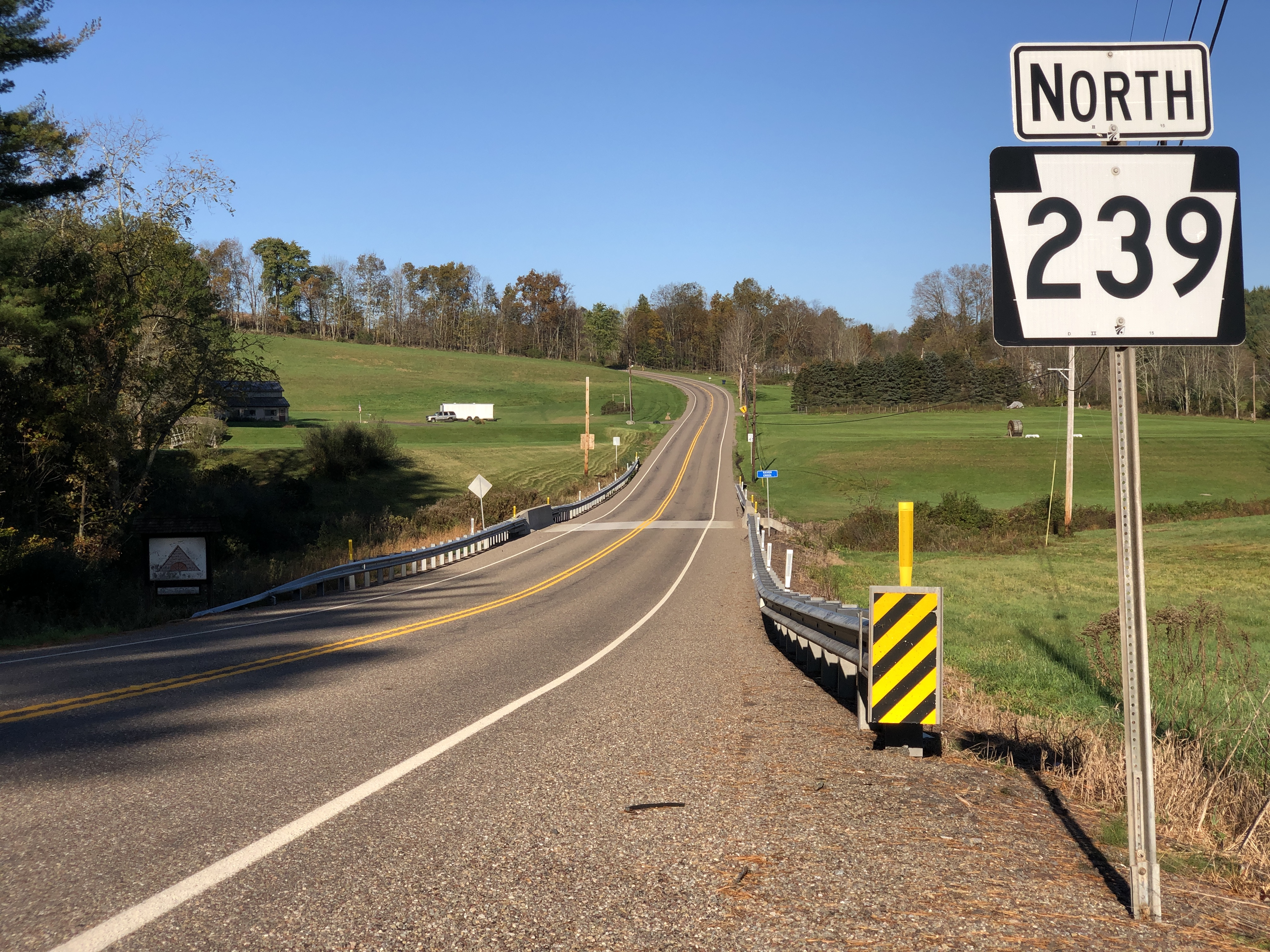
PA 239 northbound in Benton Township

A short distance after Dogtown, US 11 and PA 239 head northward into the borough of Shickshinny. Entering downtown Shickshinny, the two highways become South Main Street and pass commercial businesses. At the intersection with Union Street, US 11 continues northward along North Main Street while PA 239 turns left onto West Union Street. As it leaves Shickshinny, the road passes more residences and commercial businesses before leaving civilization in favor of woodlands once again. The route crosses under power lines and enters the community of Koonsville, where the woodlands give way for a short time to residences. After the intersection with Sunshine Road, PA 239 turns northwestward and leaves Koonsville for Union Township. Progressing northwestward, the route passes Hillcrest Lake and turns westward through a stretch of sporadic residences. After the intersection with Thorne Hill Road, PA 239 turns to the southwest, and then northwest through a small stretch of homes. This changes to farmlands as the highway winds its way through Huntington Township. Residences return as PA 239 enters the hamlet of Huntington Mills, where the road crosses a creek and continues northwest through Huntington Township until Town Hill Road, where it heads southwestward into the community of Register. Register is a community of a few homes and after Valley View Road, PA 239 continues on. After Register, the highway continues northeast, crossing south of the community of Cambra. Just after the intersection with Bonnieville Road, PA 239 crosses into Columbia County.

=== Columbia and Lycoming counties ===
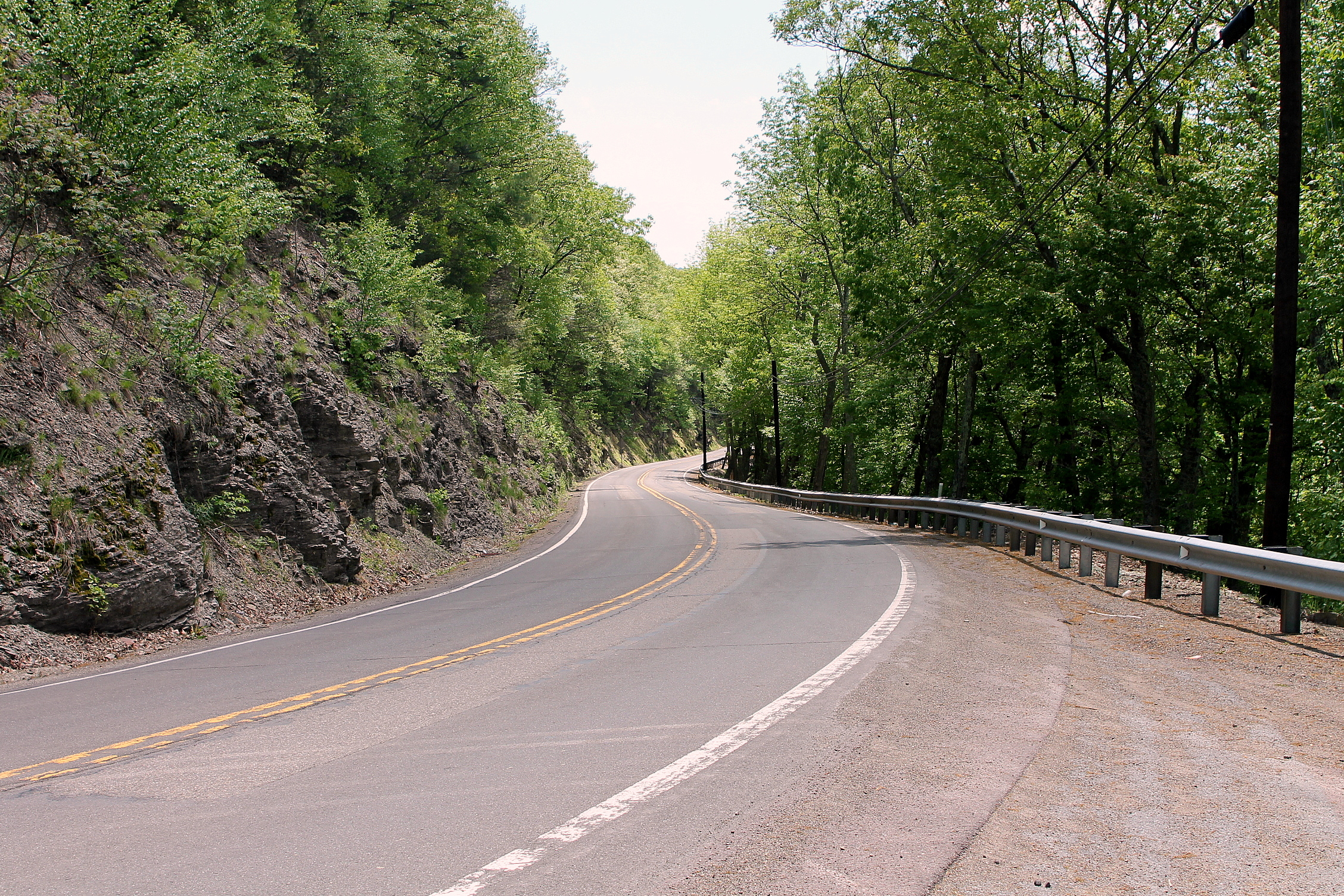
PA 239 looking south near Benton, Columbia County

After PA 239 enters Columbia County, the highway gains the name of Shickshinny Road. The surroundings remain the same for a long distance between shifts between woodlands and fields in Benton Township. After passing the Hughes Mobile Home Park, PA 239 makes a long dive to the southwest through woodlands, entering the borough of Benton. The highway gains the moniker of Benton-Shickshinny Road. Just south of downtown Benton, PA 239 intersects with PA 487 (Mill Street). The two designations become concurrent and head northward into Benton, changing monikers from Mill Street to Main Street. The commercial businesses surround PA 239 and PA 487 the entire time northward, leaving Benton for a more rural segment after North Street. The name soon changes to Red Rock Road, passing through farmlands before the two routes split. PA 487 continues north along Red Rock Road, while PA 239 turns to the northwest along Beach Glen Road.

PA 239 continues northward, winding its way to the north through the hillsides. The surroundings are rural, with a mix of fields and woods into Jackson Township. The northward progression continues as it approaches the community of Divide. PA 239 makes a short stint to the north, turning west and crossing into Lycoming County. Upon crossing into Lycoming County, PA 239 enters the community of Divide, and intersects with PA 118 just south of the Sullivan County line. PA 239 heads westward through Lycoming County, paralleling PA 118 for a distance. The dense forestry around Divide gives way back to fields and soon the reverse as the highway enters the hamlet of Lungerville. After passing the few residences that make up Lungerville, PA 239 turns to the northwest and enters North Mountain. In North Mountain, PA 239 enters a clearing and terminates at an intersection with PA 42.

== History ==
Pennsylvania Route 539
- Location: Benton–North Mountain
- Existed: 1928–1960s

When Pennsylvania legislated routes in 1911, what is now PA 239 between Shickshinny and Huntington Mills was designated as part of Legislative Route 235; at this time the road between Shickshinny and Benton was an unpaved road. PA 239 was designated in 1928 to run from US 11 in Shickshinny west to PA 339 (now PA 487) in Benton. At this time, most of the route was paved, with the middle portion under construction. In 1928, the section of the current route between Wapwallopen and Mocanaqua was designated as part of PA 393, which was unpaved, the section between Mocanaqua and Shickshinny was an unnumbered paved road, and the unpaved road between PA 339 in Benton and PA 42 in North Mountain was designated as PA 539. By 1930, the entire length of PA 239 was paved. In the 1930s, PA 29 was designated onto the present route between PA 93 and Shickshinny, replacing the section of PA 393 between Wapwallopen and Mocanaqua. This section of PA 29 along with the entire length of PA 539 was paved in the 1930s. In the 1960s, PA 239 was extended south from Shickshinny to PA 93, replacing that section of PA 29, and was extended northwest from Benton to PA 42 in North Mountain, replacing the entire length of PA 539.

== Major intersections ==
County	Location	mi	km	Destinations	Notes
Luzerne	Nescopeck Township	0.000	0.000	PA 93 (Berwick Hazleton Highway) – Berwick, Hazleton	Southern terminus
Luzerne	Shickshinny	9.290	14.951	US 11 south (Main Street) – Berwick	South end of US 11 concurrency
Luzerne	Shickshinny	9.830	15.820	US 11 north (Main Street)	North end of US 11 concurrency
Columbia	Benton	24.167	38.893	PA 487 south (Mill Street) – Bloomsburg	South end of PA 487 concurrency
Columbia	Benton Township	25.262	40.655	PA 487 north (Red Rock Road) – Red Rock	North end of PA 487 concurrency
Columbia–Lycoming county line	Jackson–Jordan township line	31.931	51.388	PA 118 (Lairdsville Road) – Hughesville, Dallas	
Lycoming	Franklin Township	36.842	59.291	PA 42	Northern terminus
1.000 mi = 1.609 km; 1.000 km = 0.621 mi: Concurrency terminus
