= Jordan Township, Lycoming County, Pennsylvania =

Township in Pennsylvania, US

- Township
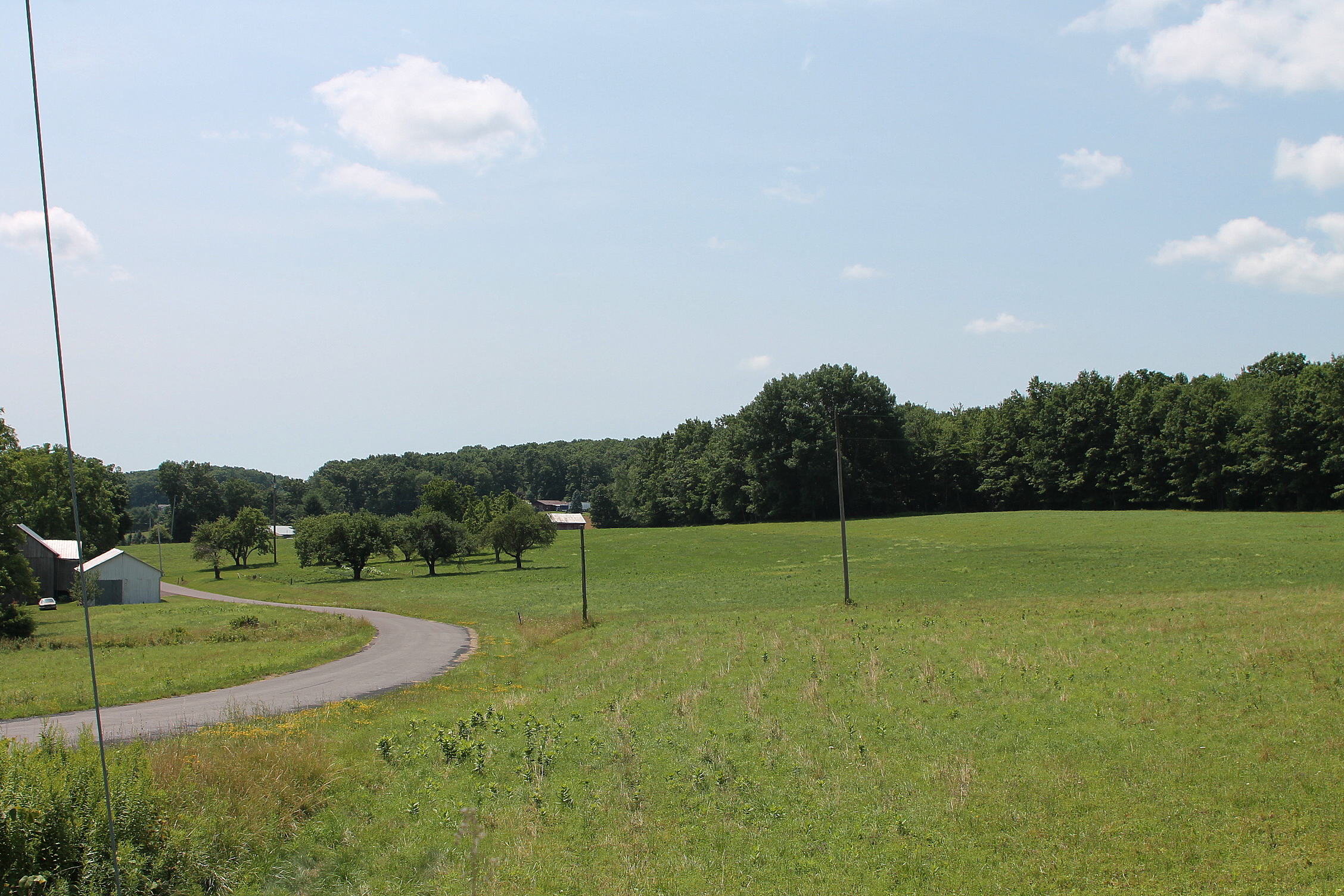
- A Jordan Township field in July 2014

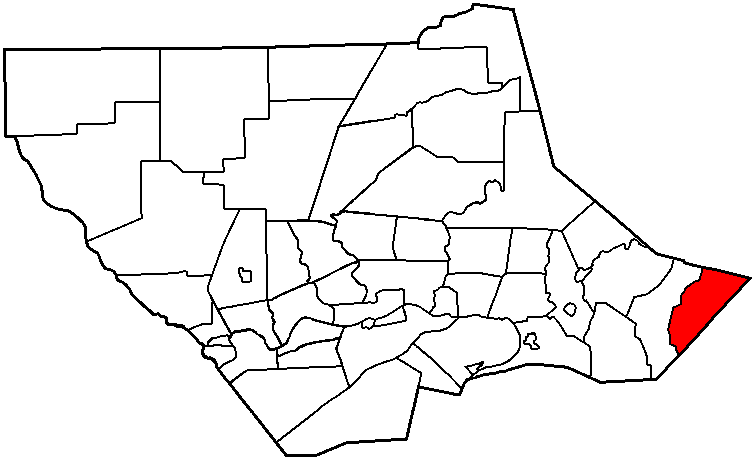
- Location of Jordan Township in Lycoming County, Pennsylvania

- Location of Lycoming County in Pennsylvania
- Coordinates: 41°14′12″N 76°31′5″W
- Country: United States
- State: Pennsylvania
- County: Lycoming
- Settled: 1812
- Incorporated: 1854

Area
  - Total: 20.93 sq mi (54.20 km^{2})
  - Land: 20.89 sq mi (54.11 km^{2})
  - Water: 0.035 sq mi (0.09 km^{2})
- Elevation: 1,263 ft (385 m)

Population (2020)
  - Total: 850 ▼
  - Estimate (2021): 847
  - Density: 41.1/sq mi (15.86/km^{2})
- Time zone: UTC-5 (Eastern (EST))
  - Summer (DST): UTC-4 (EDT)
- FIPS code: 42-081-38448
- GNIS feature ID: 1216752

Jordan Township is a township in Lycoming County, Pennsylvania, United States. The population was 850 at the 2020 census. It is part of the Williamsport metropolitan statistical area.

== History ==
Jordan Township was formed from the eastern part of Franklin Township on February 7, 1854. It was named in honor of Alexander Jordan, who was president judge of the district court at the time of the formation of the township. The first permanent settler arrived in Jordan Township in 1812. William Lore cleared a parcel of land and established a homestead; others soon followed his footsteps. The lumber industry was very important in Jordan Township for the first 70 years of its history. The hills and valleys were cleared of their old-growth forests by the end of the 19th century. Today much of those forests form a thriving second growth forest.

== Geography ==
Jordan Township lies in the easternmost portion of southern Lycoming County and is bordered by Sullivan County to the northeast, Columbia County to the southeast, and Franklin Township to the west. There are three unincorporated communities in Jordan Township: Biggerstown is near the center, Lungerville is in the north, and Unityville is near the southeast border.

Pennsylvania Route 42 passes through Biggerstown and Unityville, leading northwest 7 miles (11 km) to U.S. Route 220 at Beech Glen and south 20 miles (32 km) to Bloomsburg. PA 118 crosses PA 42 near Biggerstown and leads west 12 miles (19 km) to Hughesville and east-northeast 32 miles (51 km) to Dallas. PA 239 runs through the northern part of the township, passing through Lungerville. It leads southeastward 25 miles (40 km) to Shickshinny on the Susquehanna River and has its northwestern terminus at PA 42 in neighboring Franklin Township. Williamsport, the Lycoming county seat, is 29 miles (47 km) west of Jordan Township.

According to the U.S. Census Bureau, the township has a total area of 20.9 square miles (54.2 km^{2}), of which 0.03 square miles (0.09 km^{2}), or 0.16%, are water. The township is primarily drained by Little Muncy Creek, which has its source in the township's northeast corner and flows west to Muncy Creek and then the West Branch of the Susquehanna River at Muncy. The easternmost and southernmost parts of the township are drained by tributaries of Little Fishing Creek, which flows south to Fishing Creek and then to the main stem of the Susquehanna at Bloomsburg.

== Demographics ==
Historical population
Census	Pop.	Note	%±
2010	863		—
2020	850		−1.5%
2021 (est.)	847		−0.4%
U.S. Decennial Census

As of the census of 2000, there were 878 people, 346 households, and 252 families residing in the township. The population density was 42.4 inhabitants per square mile (16.4/km^{2}). There were 407 housing units at an average density of 19.7/sq mi (7.6/km^{2}). The racial makeup of the township was 99.66% White and 0.34% African American.

There were 346 households, out of which 30.3% had children under the age of 18 living with them, 59.8% were married couples living together, 6.9% had a female householder with no husband present, and 26.9% were non-families. 23.4% of all households were made up of individuals, and 13.3% had someone living alone who was 65 years of age or older. The average household size was 2.54 and the average family size was 2.99.

In the township the population was spread out, with 24.4% under the age of 18, 6.6% from 18 to 24, 27.6% from 25 to 44, 25.1% from 45 to 64, and 16.4% who were 65 years of age or older. The median age was 39 years. For every 100 females there were 102.3 males. For every 100 females age 18 and over, there were 97.0 males.

The median income for a household in the township was $32,375, and the median income for a family was $37,589. Males had a median income of $28,250 versus $20,515 for females. The per capita income for the township was $16,983. About 8.3% of families and 13.1% of the population were below the poverty line, including 14.1% of those under age 18 and 24.2% of those age 65 or over.
