= Numidian =

Numidian may refer to:

- Numidia, a kingdom in northwest Africa between the 3rd and 1st centuries BC
- Numidians, the Berber-speaking native inhabitants of Numidia
- Numidian language, an extinct Berber language
- Numidian cavalry, cavalry units that fought under Carthage and Rome

== See also ==
- Numidia (disambiguation)
