= Pennsylvania Route 42 =

State highway in Pennsylvania, US

Pennsylvania Route 42

Route information
- Maintained by PennDOT
- Length: 58.513 mi (94.168 km)
- Existed: 1928–present

Major junctions
- South end: PA 61 in Centralia
- PA 487 in Catawissa; US 11 in Bloomsburg; I-80 / PA 44 in Buckhorn; PA 254 in Millville; PA 442 in Iola; PA 118 near Unityville; PA 239 in North Mountain; US 220 in Muncy Valley
- North end: US 220 in Laporte

Location
- Country: United States
- State: Pennsylvania
- Counties: Columbia, Lycoming, Sullivan

Highway system
- Pennsylvania State Route System; Interstate; US; State; Scenic; Legislative
← PA 41	→ PA 43

Pennsylvania Route 42 (PA 42) is a 58.6-mile-long (94.3 km) state route that is located in central Pennsylvania. The southern terminus of the route is situated at PA 61 in Centralia. The northern terminus is located at U.S. Route 220 (US 220) in Laporte.

This route heads north through Columbia County and passes through Catawissa before it crosses the Susquehanna River to Bloomsburg. In Bloomsburg, PA 42 forms a concurrency with US 11 and has an interchange with Interstate 80 (I-80). Past Bloomsburg, the route continues north through Millville and runs through the eastern part of Lycoming County. PA 42 heads into Sullivan County and runs concurrent with US 220 between Beech Glen and Muncy Valley before it loops west through Eagles Mere and reaches its terminus in Laporte.

PA 42 was originally designated in 1927 to run from US 1 in Oxford north to the New York border in South Waverly. When first designated, the route ran concurrent with US 120 (now PA 61) between Reading and Centralia and US 220 between Laporte and South Waverly.

In 1928, the concurrencies with US 120 and US 220 were removed, splitting PA 42 into two sections. The southern section ran from the Maryland border south of Chrome north to US 222 (now US 222 Bus.) in Reading while the northern section ran from US 120 (now PA 61) in Centralia north to US 220 in Laporte. In 1935, the portion of PA 42 between Oxford and Reading was replaced by US 122 (now PA 10), with the northern terminus of the southern section cut back to US 1 in Barnsley. The southern section of PA 42 was decommissioned in the 1940s, with PA 272 replacing the portion between the Maryland border and Chrome.

== Route description ==
=== Columbia County ===
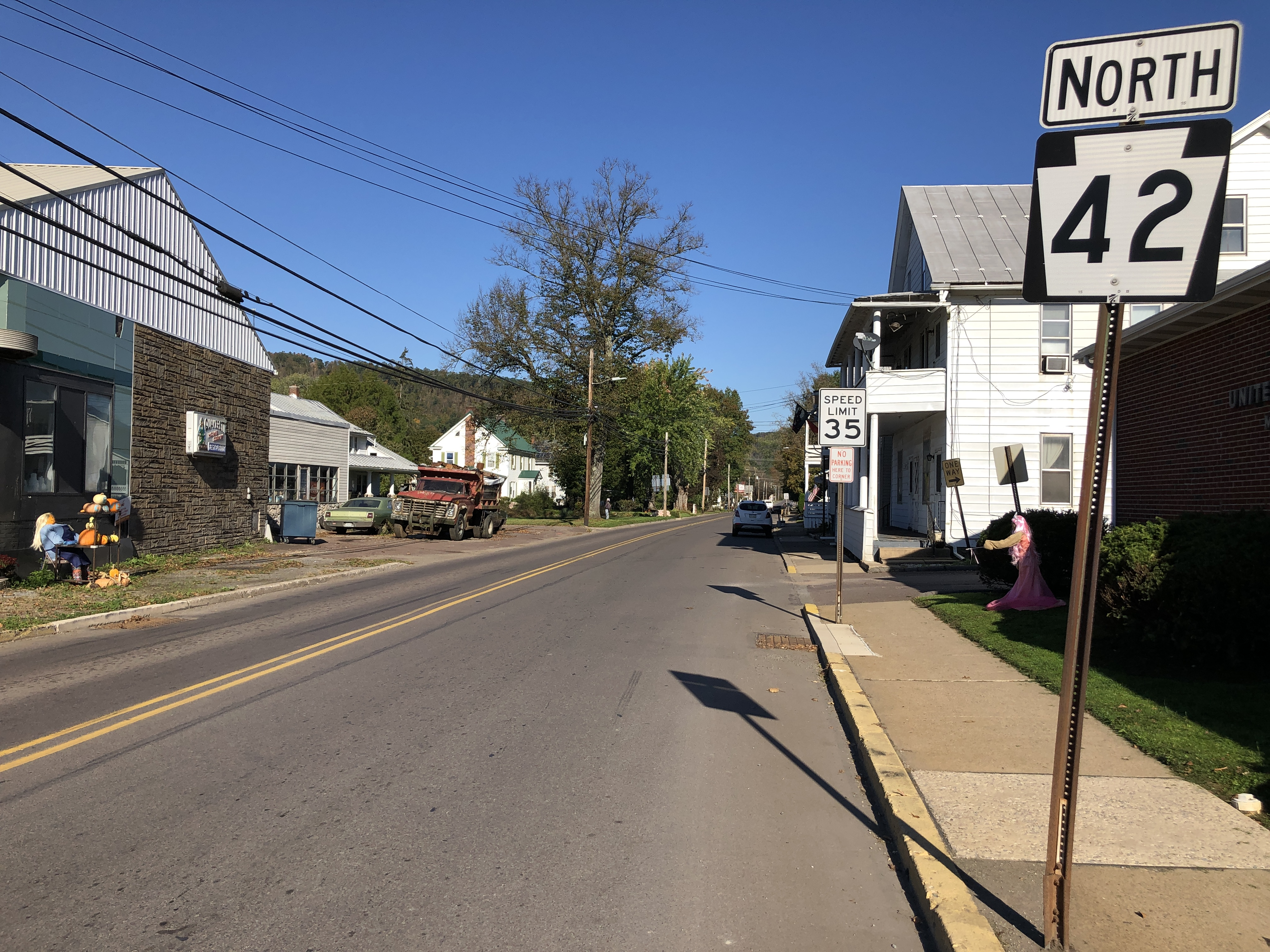
PA 42 northbound past PA 254 in Millville

PA 42 begins at an intersection with PA 61 in the borough of Centralia in Columbia County, which has largely been abandoned because of the Centralia mine fire. From PA 61, the route heads north on two-lane undivided Locust Avenue. The road passes through abandoned areas of the town which have been overgrown with trees.

The route turns east and crosses into Conyngham Township, becoming South Main Street and heading into forested areas. PA 42 widens to a four-lane road and heads to the northwest, passing through the residential community of Aristes, where it narrows back to two lanes.

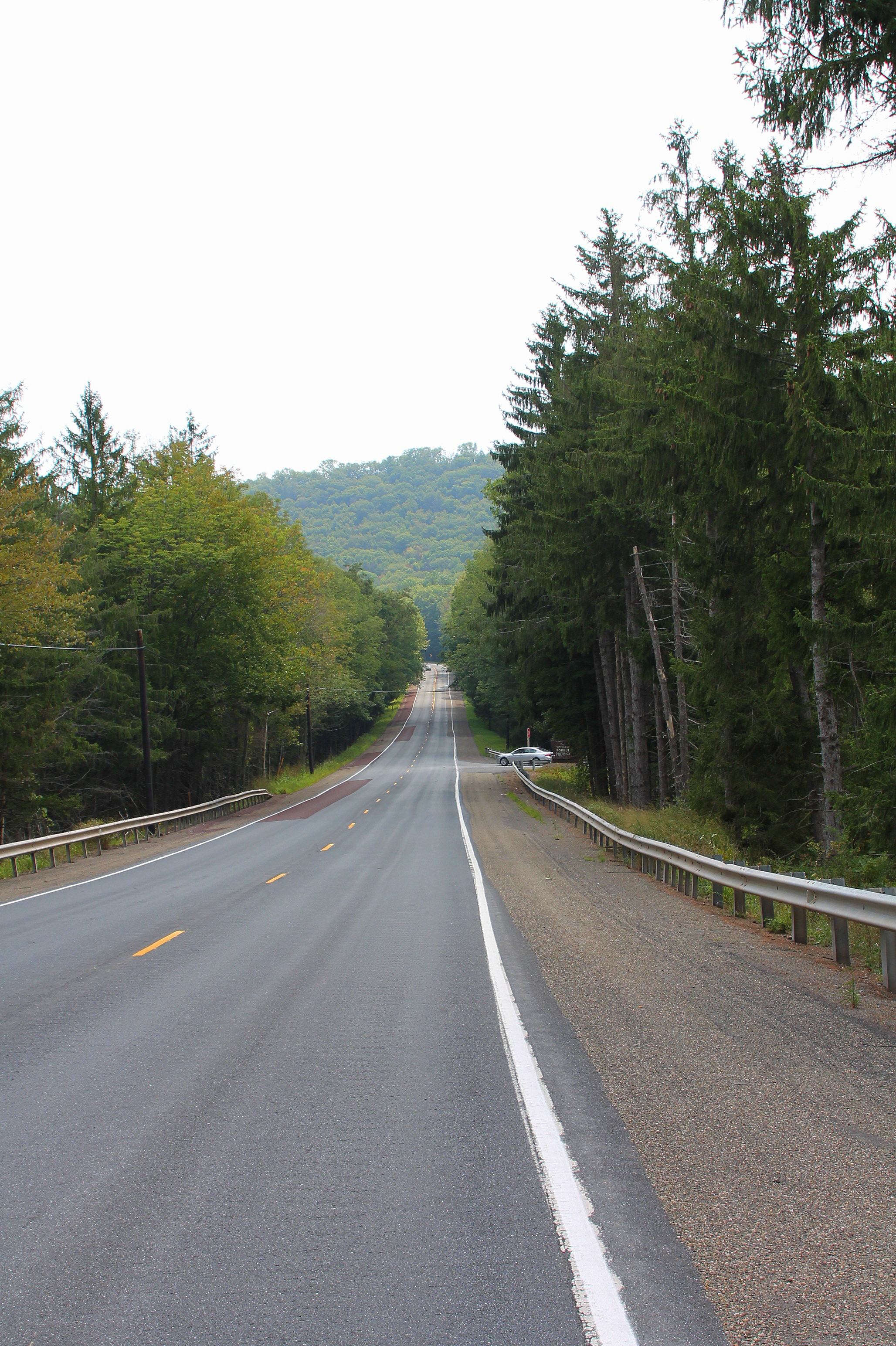
PA 42 south in Weiser State Forest

The road curves to the northeast and becomes Numidia Drive, heading into the Weiser State Forest and turning to the northwest as it crosses Big Mountain. The route turns west and northwest through more dense forests, passing to the east of Shamokin Reservoir. Continuing to the west-northwest, PA 42 enters Locust Township as it crosses Little Mountain, leaving the state forest and turning to the north.

The road heads into open agricultural areas with some woods and residences. The route briefly turns northwest before heading north again and passing through the community of Numidia. PA 42 curves to the northwest as it heads through more rural areas, crossing the Roaring Creek and continuing into Catawissa Township. The road runs through a mix of farmland and woodland with some homes, gaining a second northbound lane. The route becomes a four-lane road in a wooded area before turning into a three-lane road with one northbound lane and two southbound lanes. PA 42 comes to an intersection with PA 487, at which point that route joins PA 42 for a concurrency, with the two routes heading north through more woodland as a two-lane road.

The road crosses the Catawissa Creek into the borough of Catawissa and becomes Mill Street, heading northwest into residential areas. PA 42 splits from PA 487 by heading west-northwest on Main Street, heading through the commercial downtown of Catawissa. The road crosses Norfolk Southern's Sunbury Line before heading across the Susquehanna River, at which point the road becomes Rupert Drive and heads into Montour Township. Here, the route turns north and crosses the North Shore Railroad. PA 42 runs through wooded areas immediately to the west of the railroad tracks with the Susquehanna River a short distance to the east. The road turns north-northwest away from the railroad tracks and heads through the residential community of Rupert. The route passes through more woodland with some homes before reaching an interchange with US 11.

At this point, PA 42 heads northeast concurrent with US 11 on four-lane divided Montour Boulevard, crossing the Fishing Creek into the town of Bloomsburg. Immediately after, the route splits from US 11 at another interchange to the west of the Bloomsburg Fair fairgrounds, heading northwest on four-lane divided Mall Boulevard and crossing the Fishing Creek back into Montour Township. The road heads near residential areas and narrows into a two-lane undivided road, crossing a stream into Hemlock Township. PA 42 heads through wooded areas with some nearby commercial development, turning to the north and passing near some farmland, widening back into a four-lane divided highway. The road enters commercial areas and comes to an interchange with I-80, intersecting the southern terminus of PA 44 at the north end of the interchange. The route passes more businesses, heading to the west of the Columbia Colonnade (formerly Columbia Mall). PA 42 narrows into a two-lane undivided road and heads northeast through agricultural areas. The route turns north onto Millville Road and runs through wooded areas to the west of Little Fishing Creek. The road curves to the north-northwest and heads through more woodland with some farm fields and homes, continuing to the west of the creek. PA 42 heads back to the north and continues through more rural areas, crossing into Madison Township and turning to the west near Mordansville, becoming an unnamed road. The road turns back to the north and heads through farmland with some homes, crossing the Little Fishing Creek into Mount Pleasant Township. The route curves to the northwest and runs through more wooded areas with some farms and residences to the northeast of the creek, entering Greenwood Township and turning to the north, passing through the residential community of Eyers Grove. PA 42 continues through agricultural areas with some woods and homes, turning north-northwest and crossing into the borough of Millville. The road passes through more rural areas before becoming South State Street and running past homes. In the center of town, the route intersects PA 254 and becomes North State Street, heading through more residential areas. PA 42 passes a few businesses before turning north and heading back into Greenwood Township. Here, the road again runs along the east bank of the Little Fishing Creek as it becomes an unnamed and heads through rural areas of residential and commercial development, passing through Iola. The route heads north-northeast into a mix of farmland and woodland with some homes and intersects the eastern terminus of PA 442. PA 42 crosses the creek into Pine Township and heads north through Sereno, running through more farms and woods with occasional residences before heading into more forested areas. Farther north, the road passes through a mix of farmland and woodland with a few homes.

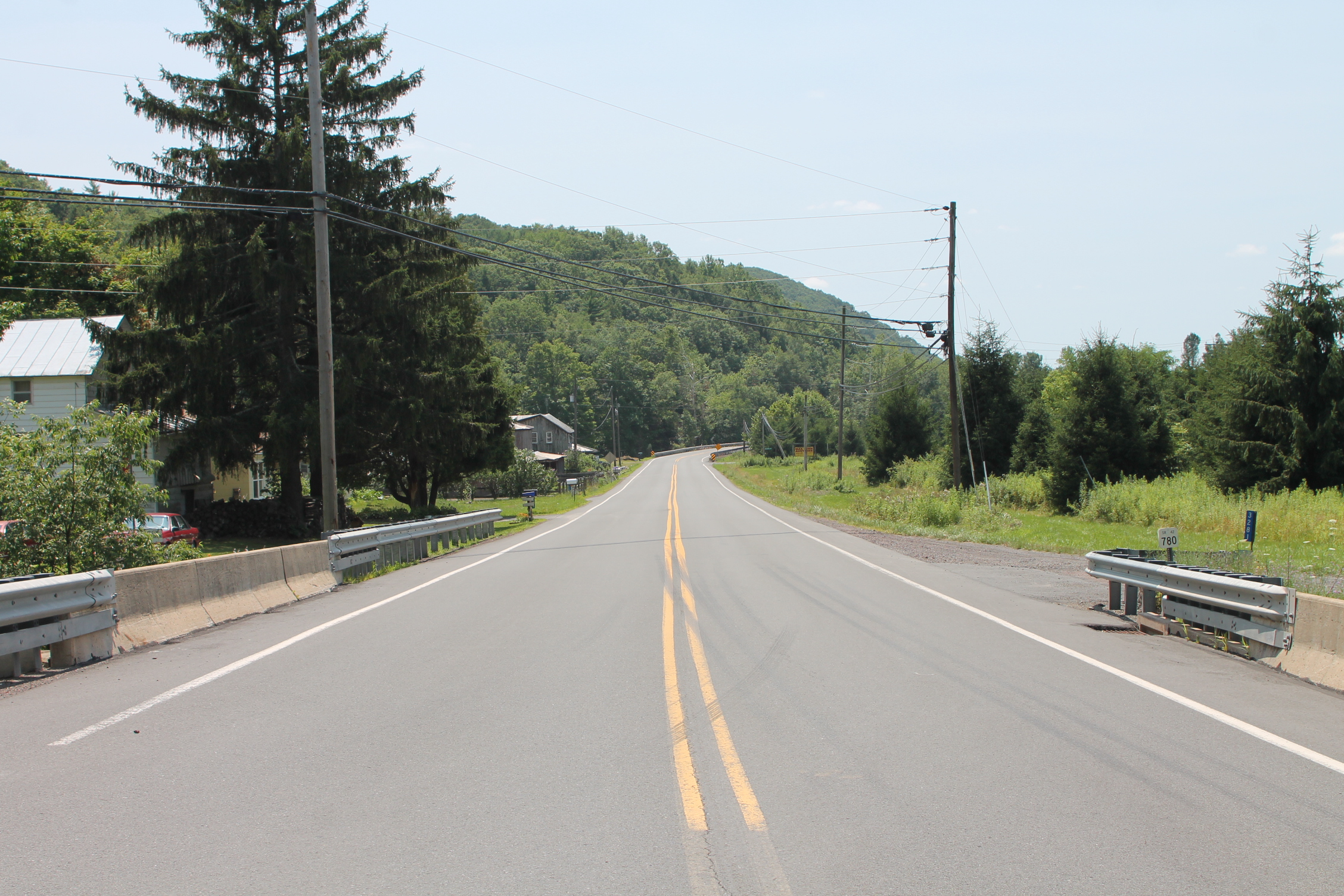
PA 42 north of Millville

=== Lycoming and Sullivan counties ===
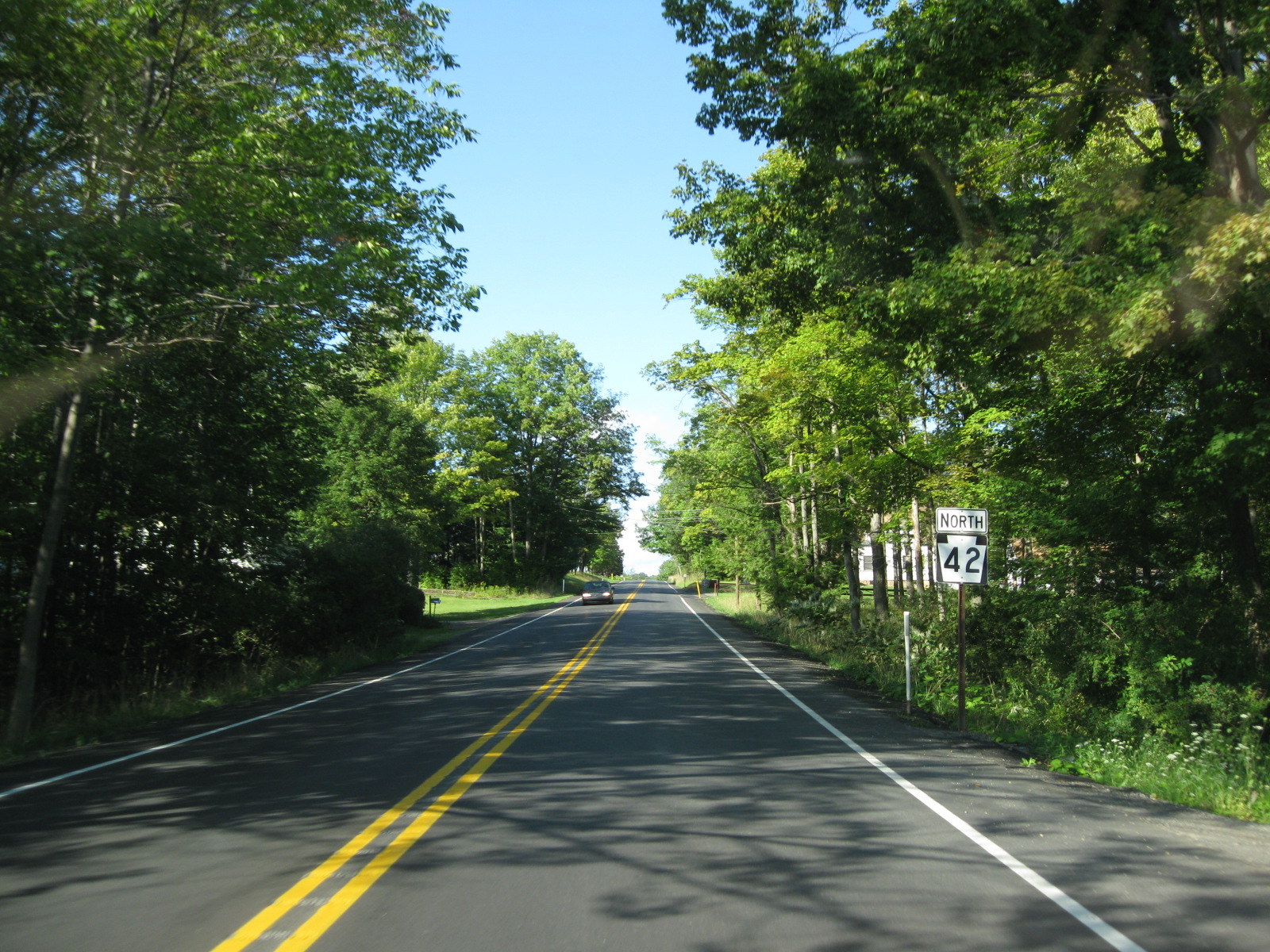
A view of PA 42 through a forested area

PA 42 enters Jordan Township in Lycoming County and continues through more agricultural and wooded areas with some residences. The road heads into more forested areas with a few homes and passes west of the community of Unityville, turning northwest and intersecting PA 118. The route curves back to the north and runs through more woodland with some farm fields and homes. PA 42 continues through agricultural areas and heads into Franklin Township, turning to the northwest and passing through more farmland and woodland with a few residences. The road heads through woods as it comes to a junction with the northern terminus of PA 239. The route continues west-northwest through more farms and woods with homes, passing through North Mountain. The road turns more to the northwest and briefly passes through a corner of Penn Township.

PA 42 heads into Davidson Township in Sullivan County, turning to the north and passing through wooded areas with some fields and homes. The road curves to the northwest as it heads through forests, turning to the west and coming to an intersection with US 220 in Beech Glen. At this point, the route turns north to form a concurrency with US 220 on the Appalachian Throughway, heading through a mix of farmland and woodland with a few residences. The road crosses the Muncy Creek and PA 42 splits from US 220 in Muncy Valley by heading northwest on an unnamed road. The route runs north through forested areas, crossing the Trout Run into Shrewsbury Township. The road heads northwest before turning to the north, continuing through dense forests. PA 42 passes through wooded areas with a few homes, curving more to the northeast and becoming Eagles Mere Avenue. The road turns to the east and enters the borough of Eagles Mere, passing through residential areas to the south of Eagles Mere Lake. The route heads back into Shrewsbury Township and becomes unnamed again, winding east through more dense forests. PA 42 heads into Laporte Township and turns to the northeast, passing to the west of Celestial Lake. The road turns to the east and continues through forested areas with some homes, heading into the borough of Laporte. Here, PA 42 becomes Main Street and passes homes with a few businesses, heading to the north of the Sullivan County Courthouse, before ending at another intersection with US 220.

== History ==
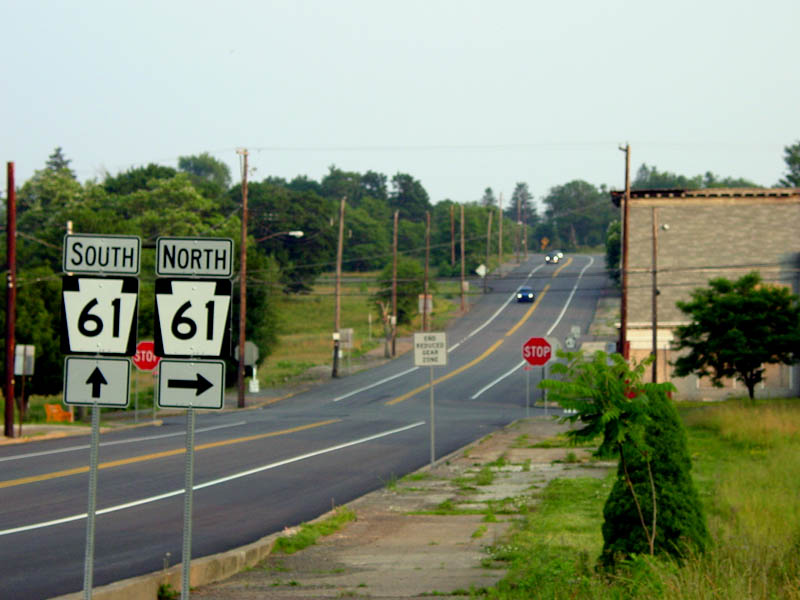
Southern terminus of PA 42 in Centralia at PA 61 in 2002

Following the passage of the Sproul Road Bill in 1911, what would become PA 42 was designated as Legislative Route 274 between Oxford and Reading, Legislative Route 160 between Reading and Hamburg, Legislative Route 141 between Hamburg and Schuylkill Haven, Legislative Route 140 between Schuylkill Haven and Pottsville, Legislative Route 161 between Pottsvile and Centralia, Legislative Route 183 between Centralia and Bloomsburg, Legislative Route 239 between Bloomsburg and Unityville, Legislative Route 17 between Laporte and Towanda, and Legislative Route 287 between Towanda and South Waverly. By 1926, the entire length of Legislative Route 274 was paved except between Compass and south of Honey Brook and Honey Brook and Morgantown. With the creation of the U.S. Highway System in 1926, the road between Reading and Centralia was designated as part of US 120, a route that ran from Philadelphia northwest to Erie, while the road between Laporte and South Waverly was designated as part of US 711, a route that ran from Northumberland north to South Waverly. At this time, the entire length of US 120 between US 22 in Reading and Centralia was paved while all of US 711 between Laporte and South Waverly was paved except for the stretch between Ringdale and New Albany. In 1927, PA 42 was designated to run from US 1/PA 12 (now PA 472) in Oxford north to the New York border in South Waverly. The route headed north Reading and ran concurrent with US 120 from Reading to Centralia. From Centralia, PA 42 headed north to Laporte and ran concurrent with US 220 (which replaced US 711) from Laporte to South Waverly.

In 1928, PA 42 was removed from its concurrencies with US 120 (now PA 61) between Reading and Centralia and US 220 between Laporte and South Waverly, splitting the route into two sections. The southern section of PA 42 ran from the Maryland border south of Chrome north to US 222/PA 73 (now US 222 Bus.) in Reading while the northern section of PA 42 ran from US 120 (now PA 61) in Centralia north to US 220 in Laporte. At this time, the entire length of the southern section of PA 42 was paved. The northern section of PA 42 was paved between Centralia and Aristes, from the south end of the US 11 concurrency in Bloomsburg to short distance north of Bloomsburg, between Millville and Iola, and between the south end of the US 220 concurrency in Beech Glen and Eagles Mere, while the route was under construction between Catawissa and US 11 in Bloomsburg and between Mordansville and Millville. By 1930, PA 42 was paved between Little Mountain and US 11 in Bloomsburg and between Mordansville and Millville.

In May 1935, the section of PA 42 between Oxford and Reading was replaced by US 122 (now PA 10). As a result, the northern terminus of the southern section of PA 42 was cut back to US 1 (Baltimore Pike) in Barnsley, having been removed from a concurrency with US 1 along Baltimore Pike between Barnsley and Oxford. By 1940, PA 42 was paved between Aristes and Little Mountain, between north of Bloomsburg and Mordansville, between Iola and the border between Columbia and Lycoming counties, between PA 539 (now PA 239) near North Mountain and US 220 in Beech Glen, for a short distance north of Eagles Mere, and for a short distance south of Laporte. In addition, the route was improved between the border between Columbia and Lycoming counties and the PA 642 junction (now PA 118) by 1940. The section along the US 11 concurrency in Bloomsburg was upgraded to a multilane road by 1940. The southern section of PA 42 was decommissioned in the 1940s, with the portion between the Maryland border and Chrome replaced by an extended PA 272 while the section between Chrome and Barnsley is now Barnsley Road. By 1950, the entire length of PA 42 was paved. In the 1950s, PA 42 was upgraded to a multilane road between Centralia and Aristes. PA 42 was widened to a divided highway between the south end of the US 11 concurrency and the I-80 interchange in Bloomsburg in the 1960s.

== Major intersections ==
County	Location	mi	km	Destinations	Notes
Columbia	Centralia	0.000	0.000	PA 61 (Centre Street/Locust Avenue) – Ashland, Pottsville, Mount Carmel	Southern terminus
Columbia	Catawissa	13.655	21.976	PA 487 south (Southern Drive) – Elysburg	South end of PA 487 concurrency
Columbia	Catawissa	14.384	23.149	PA 487 north (4th Street)	North end of PA 487 concurrency
Columbia	Montour Township	17.432	28.054	US 11 south (Montour Boulevard) – Danville	Interchange; south end of US 11 concurrency
Columbia	Bloomsburg	17.815	28.670	US 11 north (Main Street) – Bloomsburg	Interchange; north end of US 11 concurrency
Columbia	Hemlock Township	19.723	31.741	I-80 – Milton, Hazleton	I-80 exit 232
Columbia	Hemlock Township	19.902	32.029	PA 44 north (Buckhorn Road) – Buckhorn	Southern terminus of PA 44
Columbia	Millville	28.496	45.860	PA 254 (Main Street) – Washingtonville, Benton	
Columbia	Greenwood Township	30.011	48.298	PA 442 west – Muncy	Eastern terminus of PA 442
Lycoming	Jordan Township	37.987	61.134	PA 118 – Hughesville, Red Rock	
Lycoming	Franklin Township	41.043	66.052	PA 239 south – Benton	Northern terminus of PA 239
Sullivan	Davidson Township	45.534	73.280	US 220 south (Appalachian Throughway) – Williamsport	South end of US 220 concurrency
Sullivan	Davidson Township	43.799	70.488	US 220 north / PA 42 Truck north (Appalachian Throughway) – Towanda	North end of US 220 concurrency
Sullivan	Laporte	58.513	94.168	US 220 / PA 42 Truck south (Cliff Avenue) – Towanda, Williamsport	Northern terminus
1.000 mi = 1.609 km; 1.000 km = 0.621 mi: Concurrency terminus

== PA 42 Truck ==
Pennsylvania Route 42 Truck
- Location: Sullivan County, Pennsylvania
- Length: 8.820 mi (14.194 km)
- Existed: 1980–present

Pennsylvania Route 42 Truck (PA 42 Truck) is a 8.8-mile-long (14.2 km) truck route of PA 42 in Sullivan County, bypassing the section of PA 42 between Muncy Valley and Laporte. While this stretch of PA 42 winds through state forest land, trucks are designated to follow the much simpler alignment of US 220, with which PA 42 Truck is cosigned for its entire length. The truck route also terminates at the same intersection as its parent route.
