= Lopez, Pennsylvania =

Unincorporated community in Pennsylvania, US

- Unincorporated community
- Location within Pennsylvania Location within the United States
- Coordinates: 41°31′30″N 76°14′44″W
- Country: United States
- State: Pennsylvania
- County: Sullivan

Population (2010)
  - Total: 501
- Time zone: UTC-5 (Eastern (EST))
  - Summer (DST): UTC-4 (EDT)
- ZIP codes: 18628

Lopez is an unincorporated community located in Colley Township, Sullivan County, Pennsylvania, United States. The community is located on Pennsylvania Route 487. As of the 2010 census, the population of ZIP code 18628 was 501.

Lopez is named after Lopez Creek, which was in turn named after roadbuilder John R. Lopez. Originally the village was known as Tar Bridge due to a bridge covered in tar across Lopez Creek. A sawmill was constructed here in 1886, and the railroad was extended to Lopez the same year. Another mill was built in 1888, and Trexler and Turrell built dams to float timber to their mill. A clothespin factory was built in 1894 and burned down two years later, but was rebuilt. As of 1903, Lopez had a population of about 1,000.

== Notable person ==
Lopez is the birthplace of Pittsburgh Pirates player Danny Kravitz.
