= Numidia (olive oil) =

Algerian olive oil brand

- Current owner: Huileries Ouzellaguen
- Country: Algeria
- Introduced: 2008
- Website: www.huileries-ouzellaguen.com

Numidia is an Algerian brand of olive oil. It was launched in 2008 by Huileries Ouzellaguen in Ouzellaguen, in the Bejaia Province of Kabylia.

== History ==
The Numidia brand was launched in 2008 by Huileries Ouzellaguen, a subsidiary of the Ifri company. The oil is obtained through cold extraction by centrifugation using olives from the Soummam Valley in Kabylia, near the production site of the Ifri mineral water. The production site covers approximately 550 hectares, with nearly 100 hectares dedicated to semi-intensive cultivation.

Since 2019, Numidia olive oil has been available in France, and the brand has announced plans to expand to Spain and Belgium.

In 2017, the Huileries Ouzellaguen exported 15,000 liters of Numidia olive oil to Europe and Asia.

== Prizes and awards ==
- On 7 July 2019, the Numidia received the bronze medal for the best extra virgin olive oil in the "medium fruity" category.
- On 5 April 2023, during the 7th edition of the Olio Nuovo Days in Paris, an international olive oil competition, Numidia won the "Premium Gold" medal in the "green fruity" category.
