= Unityville, Pennsylvania =

Unincorporated community in Pennsylvania, US

- Unincorporated community
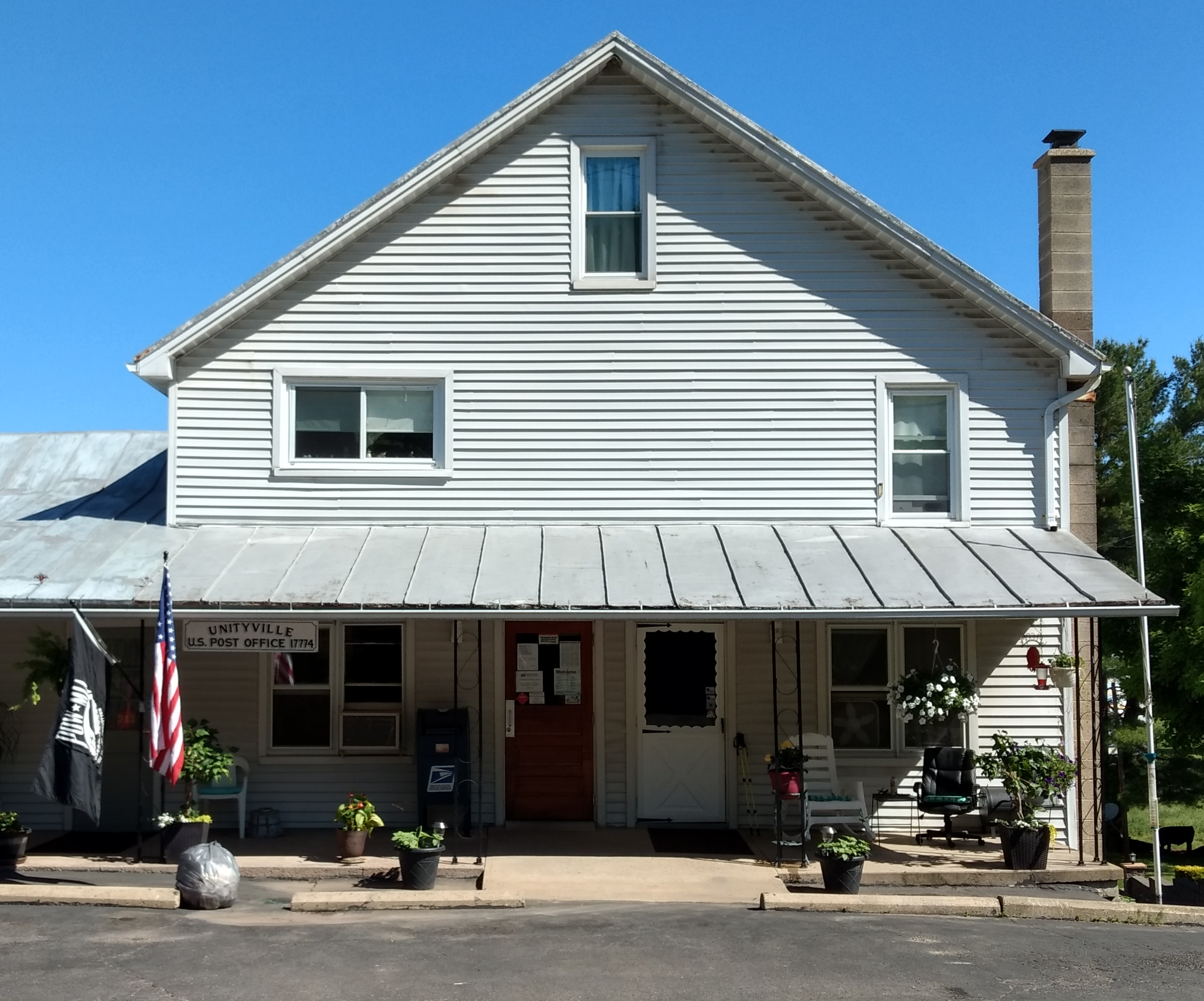
- Post office in Unityville

- Location within Pennsylvania Location within the United States
- Coordinates: 41°13′59″N 76°30′57″W
- Country: United States
- State: Pennsylvania
- County: Lycoming
- Township: Jordan
- Elevation: 1,220 ft (370 m)
- Time zone: UTC-5 (Eastern (EST))
  - Summer (DST): UTC-4 (EDT)
- ZIP code: 17774
- Area codes: 272 & 570
- GNIS feature ID: 1190209

Unityville is an unincorporated community in Jordan Township, Lycoming County, Pennsylvania, United States. The community is located along Pennsylvania Route 42, 7.9 miles (12.7 km) north of Millville. Unityville has a post office with ZIP code 17774.
