= Numidia, Pennsylvania =

Unincorporated community in Pennsylvania, US

- Census-designated place
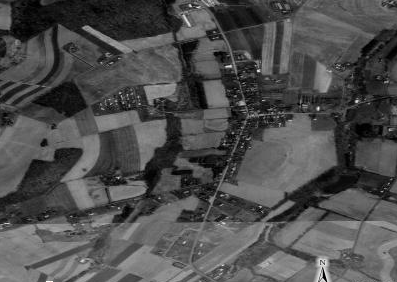
- Numidia from a bird's-eye view

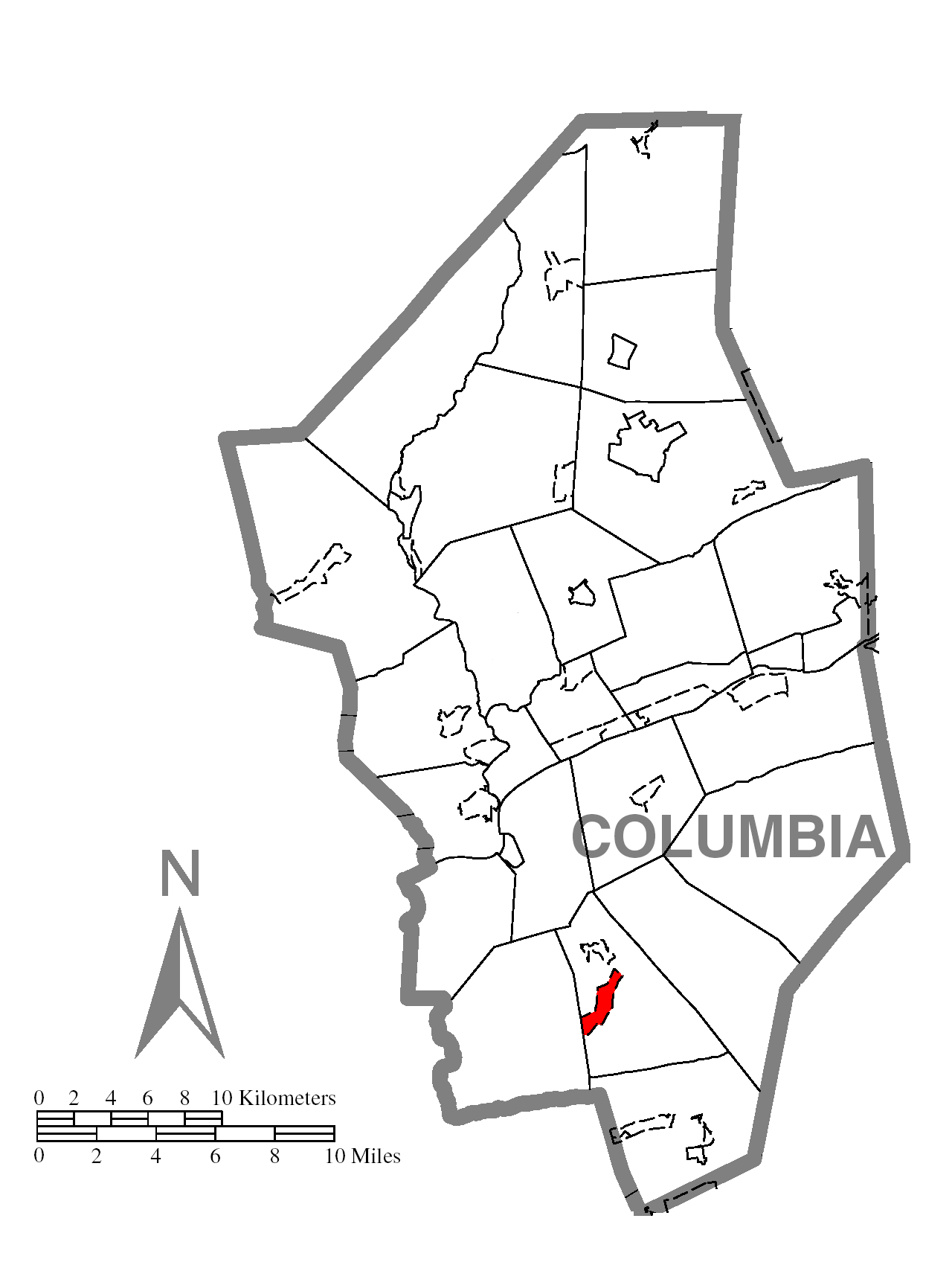
- Location within Columbia County

- Location within the U.S. state of Pennsylvania Numidia (the United States)
- Coordinates: 40°52′50″N 76°24′7″W
- Country: United States
- State: Pennsylvania
- County: Columbia
- Township: Locust

Area
  - Total: 1.06 sq mi (2.75 km^{2})
  - Land: 1.05 sq mi (2.73 km^{2})
  - Water: 0.0077 sq mi (0.02 km^{2})
- Elevation: 987 ft (301 m)

Population (2020)
  - Total: 274
  - Density: 259.7/sq mi (100.28/km^{2})
- Time zone: UTC-5 (Eastern (EST))
  - Summer (DST): UTC-4 (EDT)
- ZIP code: 17858
- FIPS code: 42-55792
- GNIS feature ID: 1182715

Numidia is a census-designated place (CDP) in Columbia County, Pennsylvania, United States. It is part of Northeastern Pennsylvania. The population was 274 at the 2020 census. It is part of the Bloomsburg-Berwick metropolitan area.

== History ==
Numidia was historically named "Leestown". A hotel was built in Numidia in 1832. The town was laid out in 1835 by Elijah Prince, who renamed the community "New Media". A post office existed in Numidia from 1847 to 1855 and from 1864 to the present day.

== Geography ==
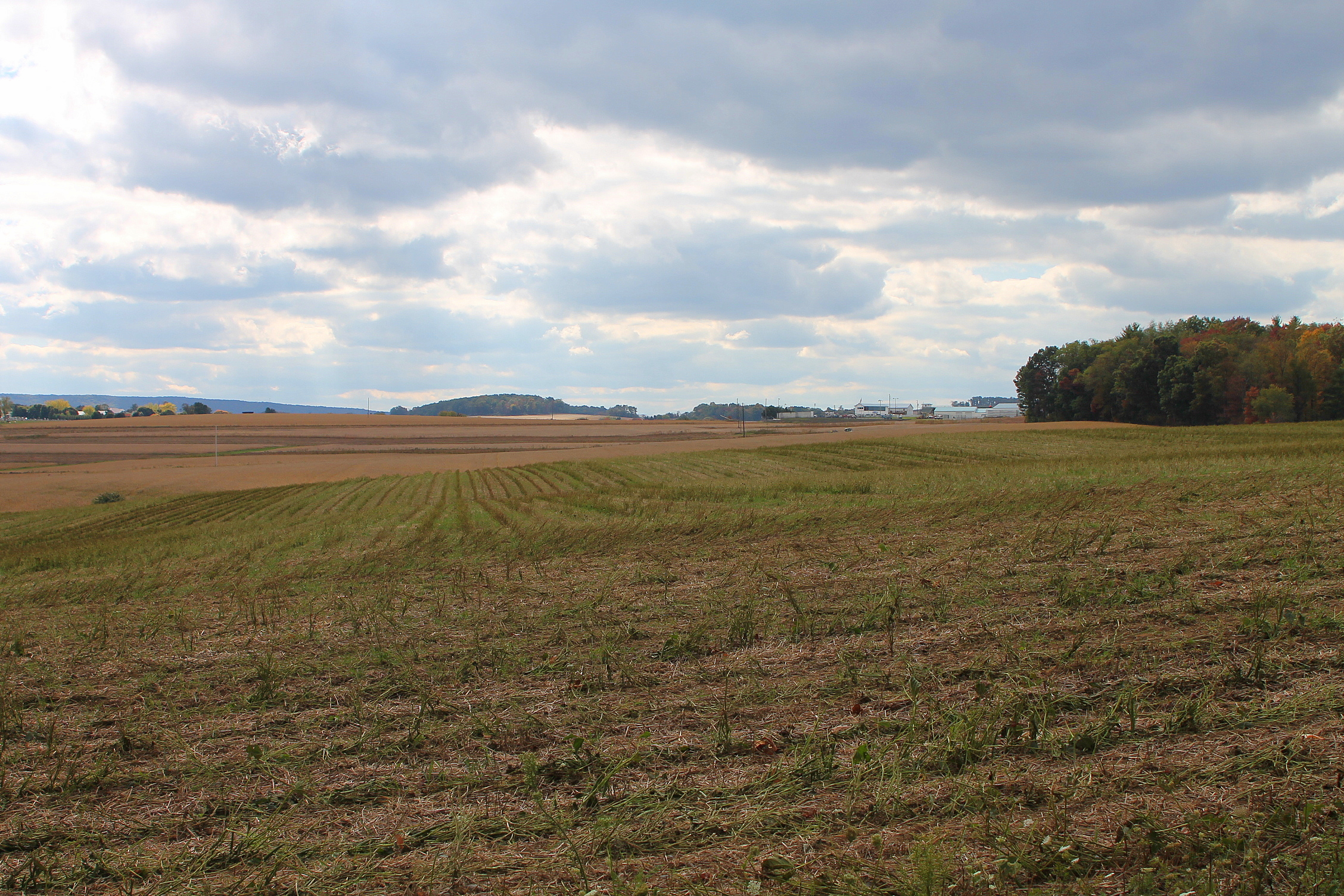
Fields in eastern Numidia

Numidia is located in southern Columbia County at 40°52′42″N 76°24′18″W (40.878323, -76.404955), in the west and center part of Locust Township.

According to the United States Census Bureau, the CDP has a total area of 1.06 square miles (2.75 km^{2}), of which 1.05 square miles (2.73 km^{2}) is land and 0.01 square miles (0.02 km^{2}), or 0.59%, is water. Numidia is 9 miles (14 km) south of Bloomsburg, the county seat, and is served by Pennsylvania Route 42. Numidia's terrain consists of rolling hills, with the center of the community following a low ridgecrest. The CDP is mostly farmland with some houses along Pennsylvania Route 42.

== Demographics ==
Historical population
Census	Pop.	Note	%±
2020	274		—
U.S. Decennial Census

As of the census of 2000, there were 254 people, 104 households, and 74 families residing in the CDP. The population density was 240.0 people per square mile (92.7 people/km^{2}). There were 113 housing units at an average density of 106.8 per square mile (41.2/km^{2}). The racial makeup of the CDP was 99.61% White and 0.39% African American.

There were 104 households, out of which 30.8% had children under the age of 18 living with them, 65.4% were married couples living together, 3.8% had a female householder with no husband present, and 28.8% were non-families. 27.9% of all households were made up of individuals, and 16.3% had someone living alone who was 65 years of age or older. The average household size was 2.44 and the average family size was 2.99.

In the CDP, the population was spread out, with 24.8% under the age of 18, 5.1% from 18 to 24, 28.7% from 25 to 44, 20.5% from 45 to 64, and 20.9% who were 65 years of age or older. The median age was 42 years. For every 100 females, there were 91.0 males. For every 100 females age 18 and over, there were 92.9 males.

The median income for a household in the CDP was $41,875, and the median income for a family was $46,750. Males had a median income of $36,042 versus $24,375 for females. The per capita income for the CDP was $15,160. About 5.5% of families and 6.4% of the population were below the poverty line, including 6.9% of those under the age of eighteen and 12.2% of those sixty five or over.

== Transportation ==
Numidia Airport is just southeast of the community. The only major road running through Numidia is Pennsylvania Route 42.

== Education ==
The school district is the Southern Columbia Area School District.

The Bloomsburg University of Pennsylvania, with over 8,000 students, is the nearest college to Numidia.

== Climate ==
The average wind speed in Numidia is between 6 and 7 miles per hour in August and between 9 and 10 miles per hour in April. This makes the CDP less windy than the average U.S. city. February is the driest month in Numidia with 2 inches of precipitation on average. June and September are the wettest months in Numidia with close to 5 inches of precipitation on average. In January, the average high temperature in Numidia is 35 °F and the average low is 19 °F. In July, the average high temperature in Numidia is 84 °F and the average low is 62 °F. The highest recorded temperature is 105 °F in July 1988, and the lowest recorded temperature in Numidia is -26°F in January 1994.
