= Jackson Township, Columbia County, Pennsylvania =

Township in Pennsylvania, US

Coordinates: 41°16′00″N 76°25′59″W

- Township
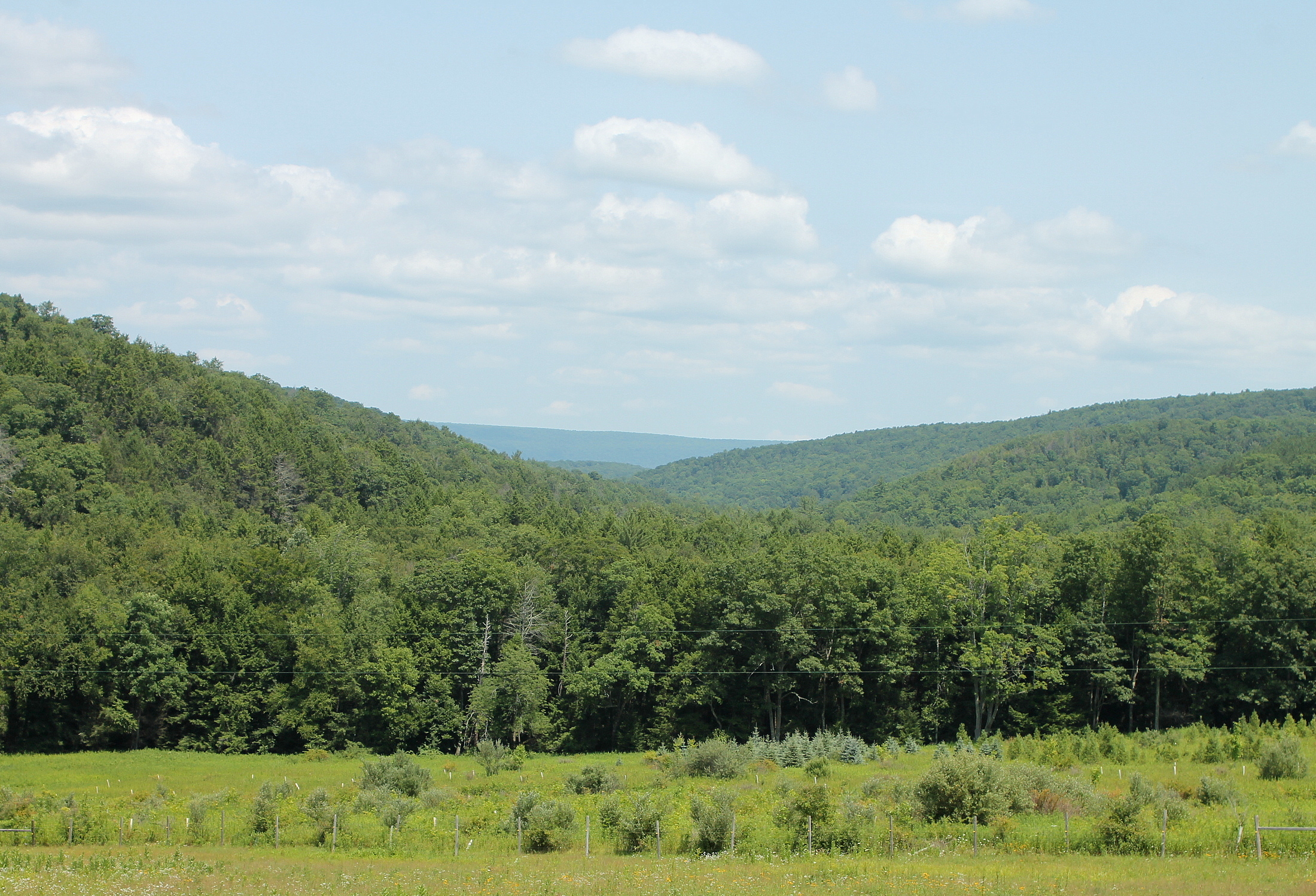
- A view of Jackson Township looking north

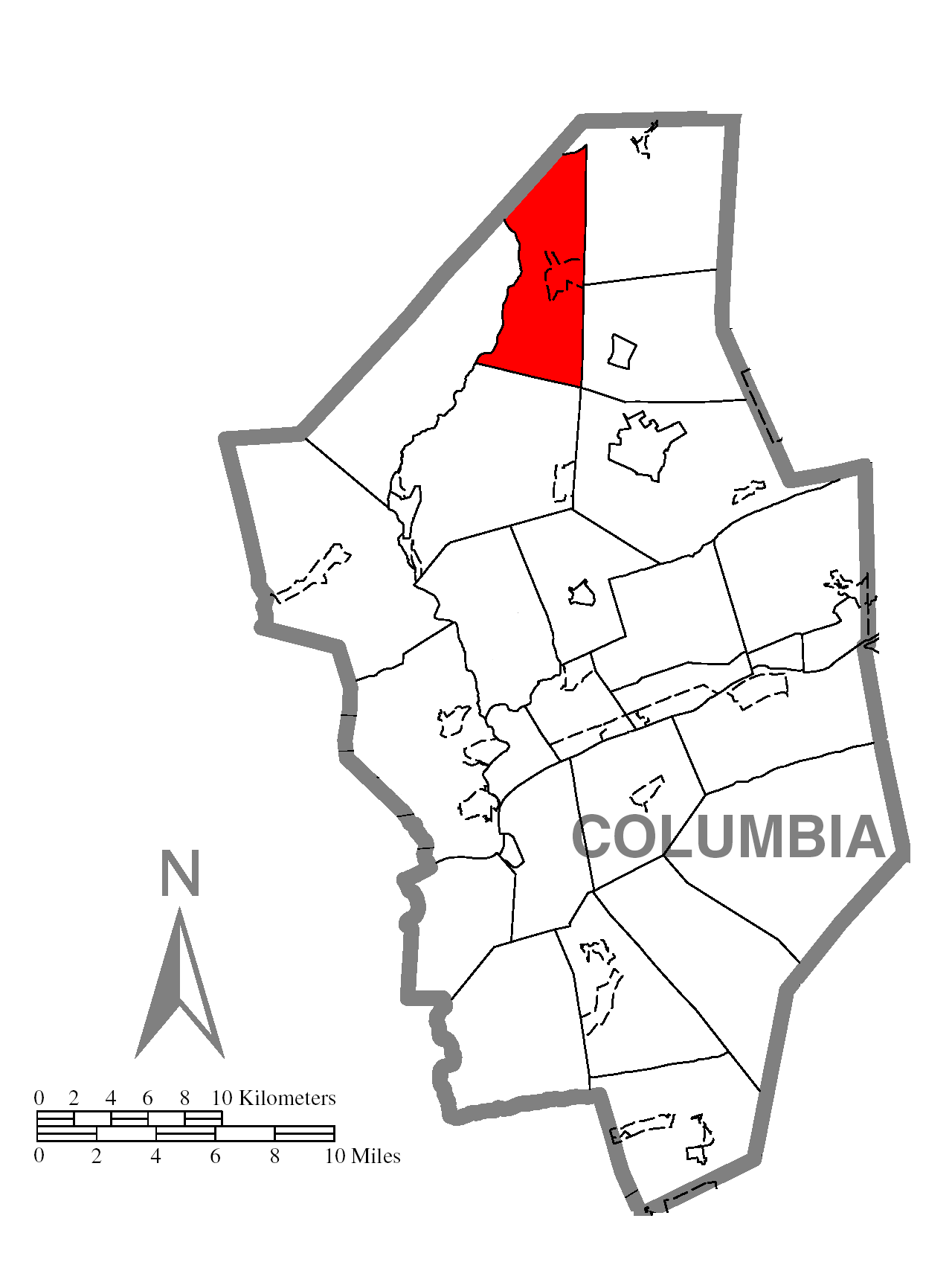
- Map of Columbia County, Pennsylvania highlighting Jackson Township

- Map of Columbia County, Pennsylvania
- Country: United States
- State: Pennsylvania
- County: Columbia
- Settled: 1800
- Incorporated: 1838

Area
  - Total: 18.43 sq mi (47.73 km^{2})
  - Land: 18.39 sq mi (47.63 km^{2})
  - Water: 0.035 sq mi (0.09 km^{2})

Population (2020)
  - Total: 624 ▼
  - Estimate (2021): 624
  - Density: 34.3/sq mi (13.23/km^{2})
- Time zone: UTC-5 (Eastern (EST))
  - Summer (DST): UTC-4 (EDT)
- Postal code: [17814]
- Area code: 570
- FIPS code: 42-037-37360
- Website: www.jacksontownship.us

Jackson Township is a township in Columbia County, Pennsylvania. It is part of Northeastern Pennsylvania. The population was 624 at the 2020 census.

== History ==
The Jud Christie Covered Bridge No. 95 and Creasyville Covered Bridge were listed on the National Register of Historic Places in 1979.

== Geography ==
Jackson Township is in northern Columbia County, bordered to the northwest by Sullivan County and Lycoming County. The western border of the township follows Little Fishing Creek, which flows south towards Fishing Creek and the Susquehanna River. The majority of the township is hilly, with elevations ranging from 850 to 1,300 feet (260 to 400 m) above sea level, while the northernmost part of the township rises to the 2,340-foot (710 m) crest of Huckleberry Mountain, along the edge of the Allegheny Plateau.

According to the United States Census Bureau, the township has a total area of 18.4 square miles (47.7 km^{2}), of which 0.04 square miles (0.1 km^{2}), or 0.20%, is water. It contains the census-designated place of Waller.

== Demographics ==
Historical population
Census	Pop.	Note	%±
2010	626		—
2020	624		−0.3%
2021 (est.)	624		0.0%
U.S. Decennial Census

As of the census of 2000, there were 598 people, 243 households, and 181 families residing in the township. The population density was 32.2 inhabitants per square mile (12.4/km^{2}). There were 309 housing units at an average density of 16.6 units per square mile (6.4 units/km^{2}). The racial makeup of the township was 98.83% White, 1.00% Native American, 0.17% from other races.

There were 243 households, out of which 25.1% had children under the age of 18 living with them, 65.4% were married couples living together, 3.7% had a female householder with no husband present, and 25.5% were non-families. 21.4% of all households were made up of individuals, and 10.3% had someone living alone who was 65 years of age or older. The average household size was 2.46 and the average family size was 2.87.

In the township the population was spread out, with 21.4% under the age of 18, 6.2% from 18 to 24, 28.6% from 25 to 44, 28.3% from 45 to 64, and 15.6% who were 65 years of age or older. The median age was 42 years. For every 100 females, there were 100.7 males. For every 100 females age 18 and over, there were 100.0 males.

The median income for a household in the township was $37,250, and the median income for a family was $40,833. Males had a median income of $35,893 versus $19,167 for females. The per capita income for the township was $17,016. About 4.0% of families and 7.7% of the population were below the poverty line, including 12.5% of those under age 18 and 13.7% of those age 65 or over.
