= Benton Township, Columbia County, Pennsylvania =

Township in Pennsylvania, US

Coordinates: 41°12′00″N 76°22′59″W

- Township
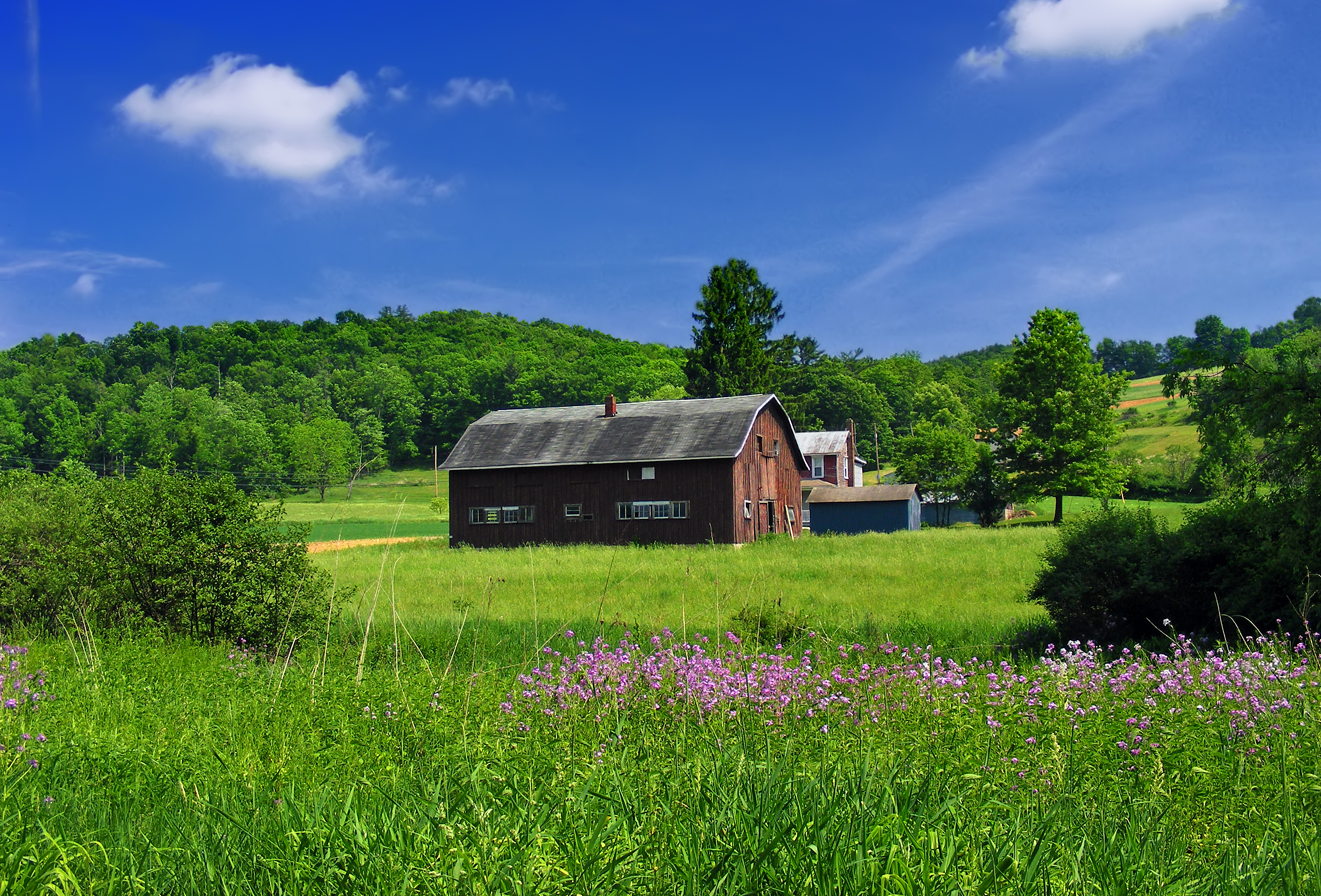
- A Benton Township farm

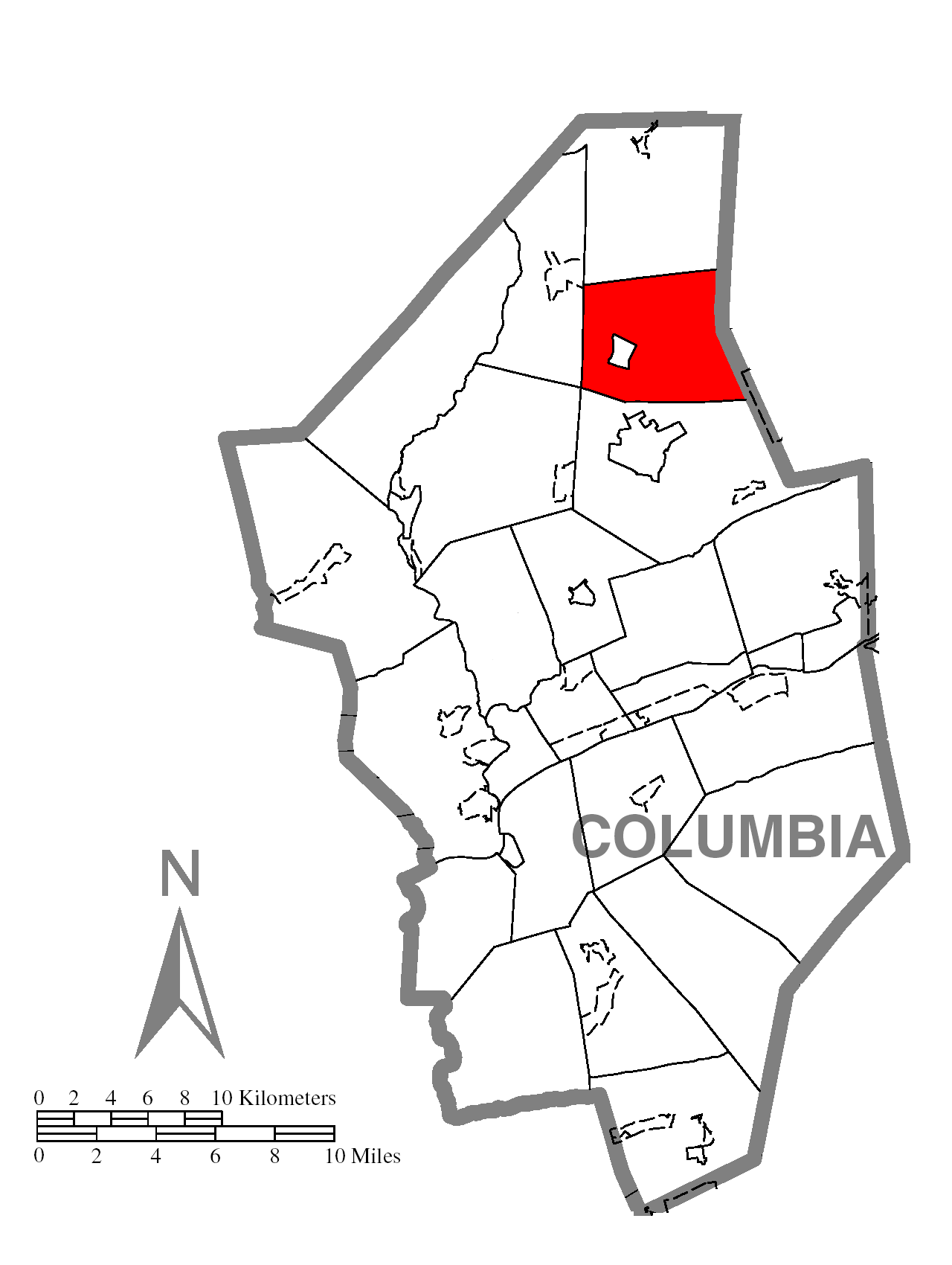
- Map of Columbia County, Pennsylvania highlighting Benton Township

- Map of Columbia County, Pennsylvania
- Country: United States
- State: Pennsylvania
- County: Columbia
- Settled: 1791
- Incorporated: 1850

Area
  - Total: 19.93 sq mi (51.63 km^{2})
  - Land: 19.67 sq mi (50.95 km^{2})
  - Water: 0.26 sq mi (0.68 km^{2})

Population (2020)
  - Total: 1,323 ▲
  - Estimate (2021): 1,338
  - Density: 64.1/sq mi (24.73/km^{2})
- Time zone: UTC-5 (Eastern (EST))
  - Summer (DST): UTC-4 (EDT)
- Area code: 570
- FIPS code: 42-037-05688
- Website: bentontownship.us

Benton Township is a township in Columbia County, Pennsylvania. It is part of Northeastern Pennsylvania. The population was 1,323 at the 2020 census.

== Geography ==
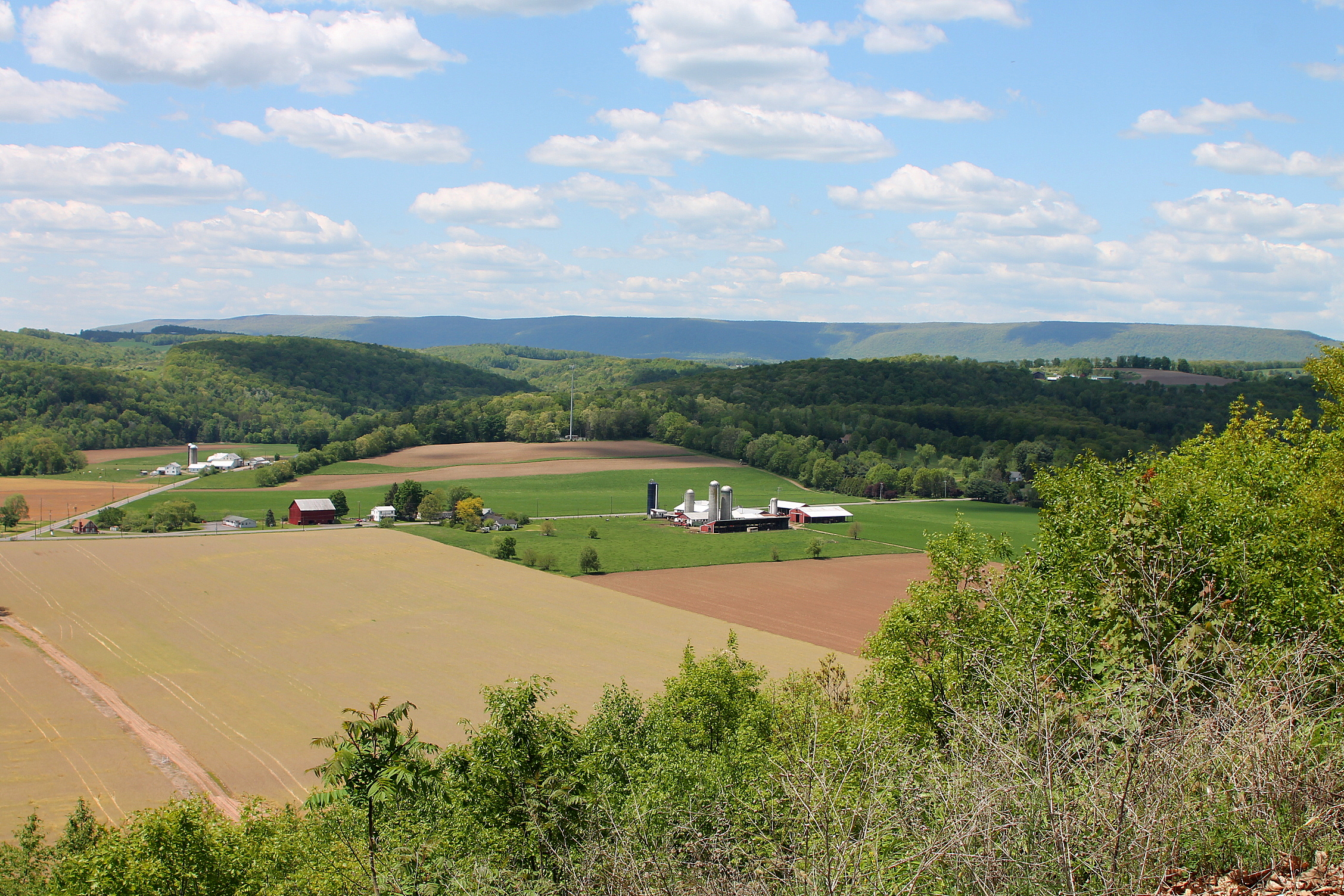
Benton Township northeast of Benton and looking northwest

Benton Township is in northeastern Columbia County and is bordered to the east by Luzerne County. The township surrounds the borough of Benton, a separate municipality. According to the United States Census Bureau, the township has a total area of 19.9 square miles (51.6 km^{2}), of which 19.7 square miles (51.0 km^{2}) is land and 0.27 square miles (0.7 km^{2}), or 1.32%, is water. Fishing Creek is the largest waterway in the township, flowing southwards across its western side.

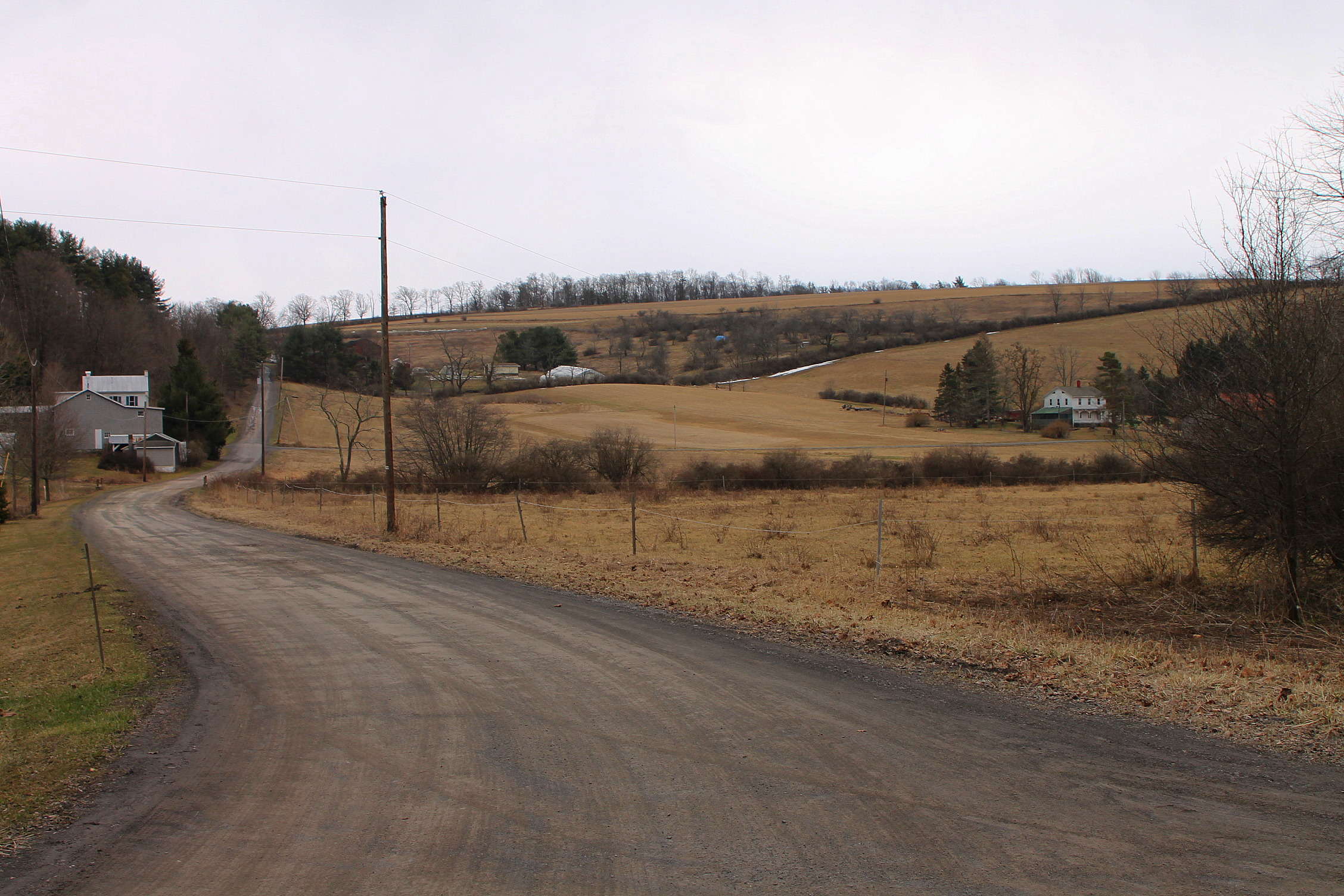
Benton Township in April

== Demographics ==
Historical population
Census	Pop.	Note	%±
2010	1,245		—
2020	1,323		6.3%
2021 (est.)	1,338		1.1%
U.S. Decennial Census

As of the census of 2000, there were 1,216 people, 489 households, and 372 families residing in the township. The population density was 60.6 inhabitants per square mile (23.4/km^{2}). There were 547 housing units at an average density of 27.3 per square mile (10.5/km^{2}). The racial makeup of the township was 98.36% White, 0.49% Native American, 0.08% Asian, and 1.07% from two or more races. Hispanic or Latino of any race were 0.58% of the population.

There were 489 households, out of which 31.7% had children under the age of 18 living with them, 62.8% were married couples living together, 8.2% had a female householder with no husband present, and 23.9% were non-families. 19.6% of all households were made up of individuals, and 7.8% had someone living alone who was 65 years of age or older. The average household size was 2.49 and the average family size was 2.83.

In the township the population was spread out, with 22.5% under the age of 18, 5.8% from 18 to 24, 30.0% from 25 to 44, 25.8% from 45 to 64, and 15.9% who were 65 years of age or older. The median age was 41 years. For every 100 females, there were 102.3 males. For every 100 females age 18 and over, there were 101.7 males.

The median income for a household in the township was $37,955, and the median income for a family was $40,625. Males had a median income of $28,438 versus $23,077 for females. The per capita income for the township was $17,853. About 4.4% of families and 7.5% of the population were below the poverty line, including 8.0% of those under age 18 and 5.9% of those age 65 or over.

== Notable person ==
John Geiser McHenry – was a Democratic member of the U.S. House of Representatives.
