= Wolfhouse Run =

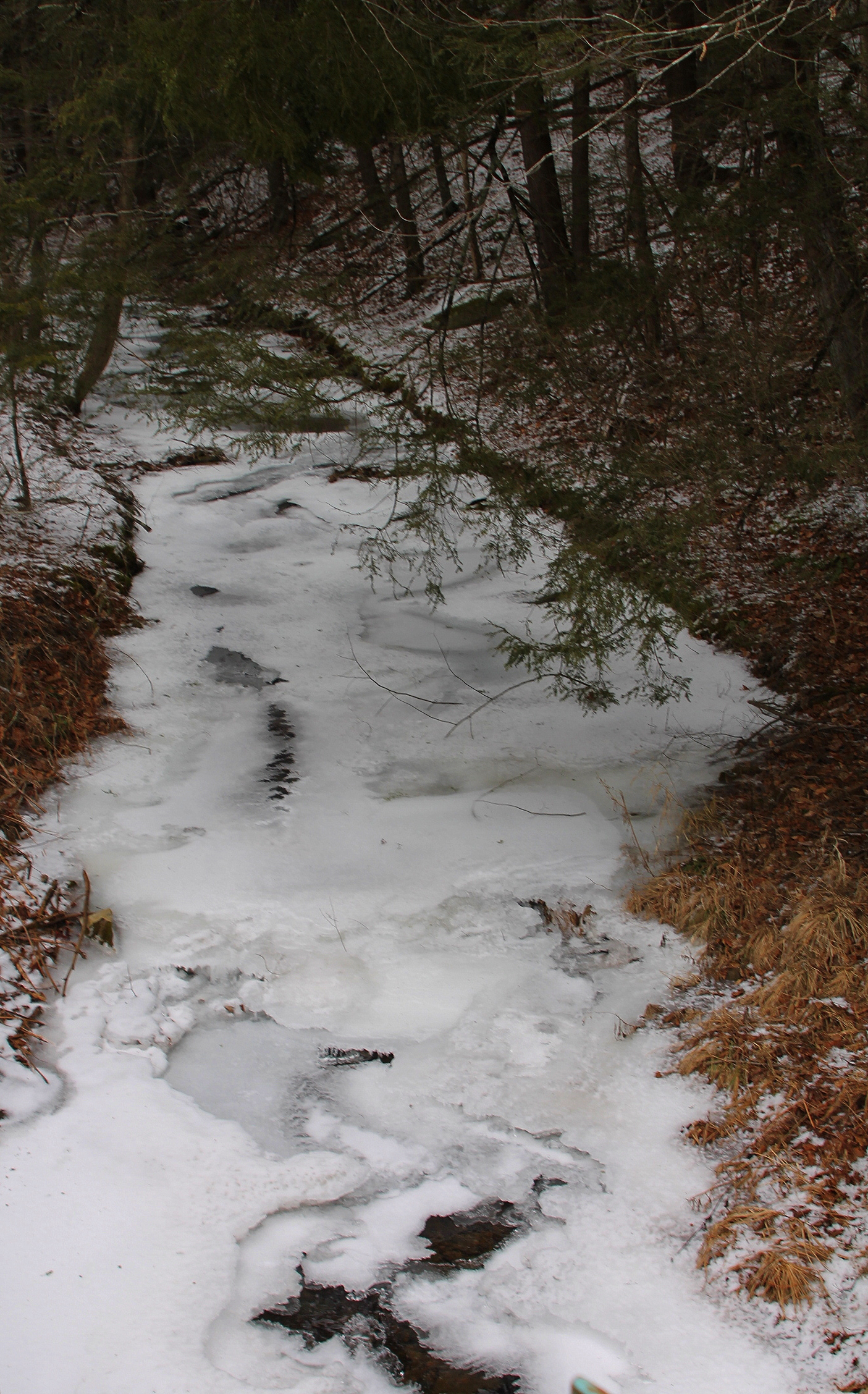
- Wolfhouse Run looking upstream
- Etymology: cabin owned by the Wolf family

Physical characteristics
- Source
  - location: near Wolfhouse Hollow Road in a valley in Pine Township, Columbia County, Pennsylvania
  - elevation: 1,180 ft (360 m)
- Mouth
  - location: Little Fishing Creek on the border between Pine Township, Columbia County, Pennsylvania and Greenwood Township, Columbia County, Pennsylvania
  - coordinates: 41°09′58″N 76°30′14″W
  - elevation: 761 ft (232 m)
- Length: 2.9 mi (4.7 km)
- Basin size: 2.9 sq mi (7.5 km^{2})

Basin features
- Progression: Little Fishing Creek → Fishing Creek → Susquehanna River → Chesapeake Bay

Wolfhouse Run is a tributary of Little Fishing Creek in Columbia County, Pennsylvania, in the United States. It is approximately 2.9 miles (4.7 km) long and flows through Pine Township. The watershed of the stream has an area of 2.03 square miles (5.3 km^{2}). The steam is considered to be an Exceptional Value stream and a Coldwater Fishery. However, it is considered to be impaired as well. At least two bridges and one sawmill have been built over or on the stream.

== Course ==
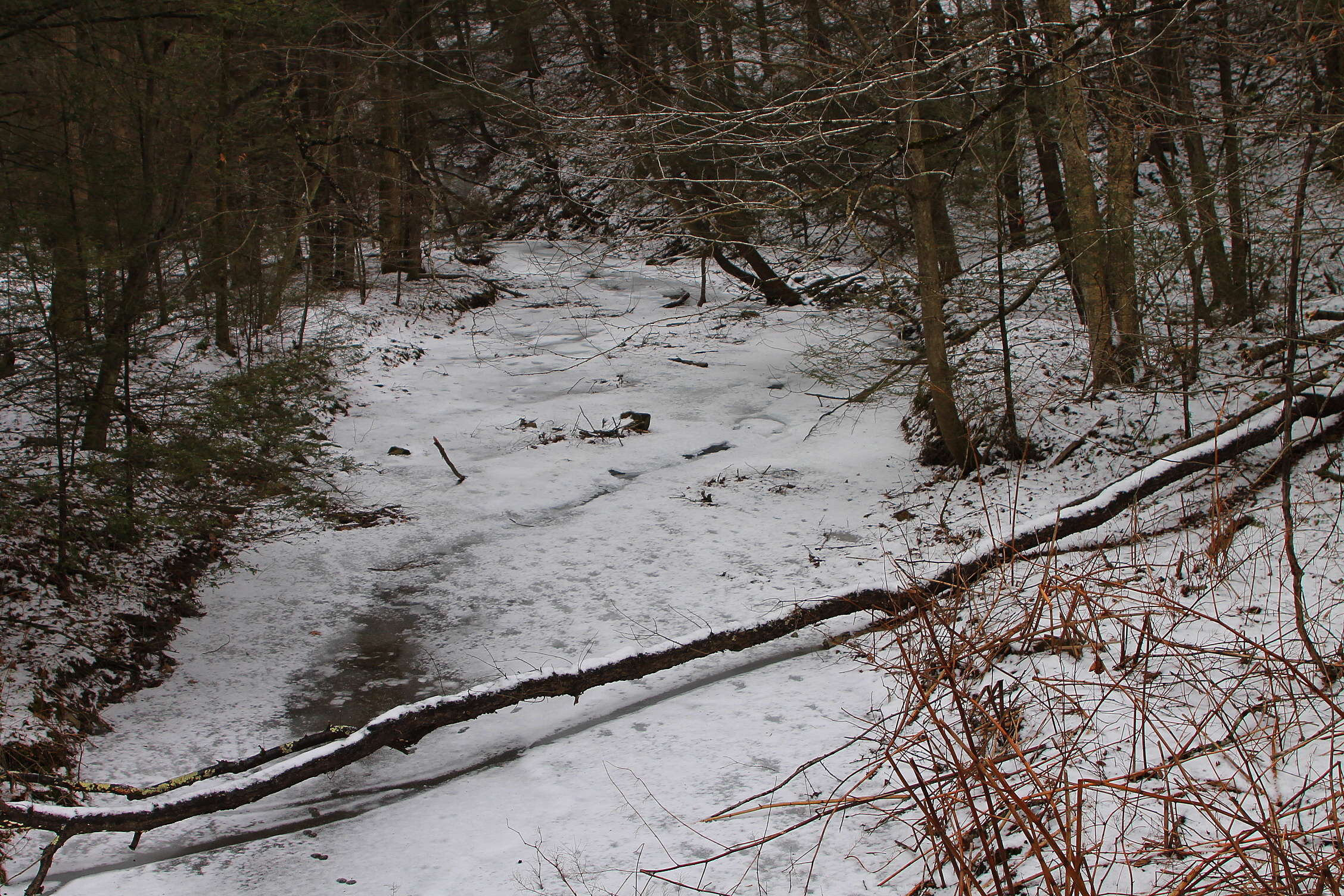
Wolfhouse Run looking downstream in January

Wolfhouse Run begins near Wolfhouse Hollow Road in a valley in Pine Township. It flows south-southwest for a few tenths of a mile, crossing the road. The stream then turns south and slightly west and begins to flow parallel to Wolfhouse Hollow Road for nearly a mile. Its valley gradually deepens in this area. The stream then turns south-southwest, still flowing parallel to Wolfhouse Hollow Road, for a few tenths of a mile. It then turns south-southeast for more than a mile and continues to flow parallel to Wolfhouse Hollow Road. Eventually, the stream reaches its confluence with Little Fishing Creek at the border between Pine Township and Greenwood Township.

Wolfhouse Run joins Little Fishing Creek 13.28 miles (21.37 km) upstream of its mouth.

== Geography and hydrology ==
The elevation near the mouth of Wolfhouse Run is 761 feet (232 m) above sea level. The elevation of the stream's source is approximately 1,180 feet (360 m) above sea level.

Wolfhouse Run is considered to be impaired by road runoff for its entire length. However, a total maximum daily load has not been created for the stream.

== Watershed ==
The watershed of Wolfhouse Run has an area of 2.03 square miles (5.3 km^{2}). The watershed of the stream is in the Lower North Branch Susquehanna River drainage basin.

Wolfhouse Run is in the United States Geological Survey quadrangle of Lairdsville. The mouth of the stream is in the west-central portion of Greenwood Township. Additionally, the stream is near Millville.

== History and etymology ==
Wolfhouse Run was entered into the Geographic Names Information System on August 2, 1979. Its identifier in the Geographic Names Information System is 1191700.

A sawmill was constructed on Wolfhouse Run by Richard Greenly in 1835. However, it was destroyed by a cloudburst in June 1836. Greenly returned to the area and rebuilt the sawmill in 1841. J.L. Eves was the final owner of the sawmill. A number of bridges have also been built over the stream. A steel stringer bridge was built over Wolfhouse Run in 1952 and repaired in 2003. It is 21.0 feet (6.4 m) long and is located 2.5 miles (4.0 km) northeast of the community of Sereno. Another bridge was built over the stream in 1952 at a location 2 miles (3.2 km) north of Sereno. It is a concrete slab bridge that is 21.0 feet (6.4 m) long. It was repaired in 1988.

Wolfhouse Run is commonly thought to be named after a den of wolves. However, it is actually named after a cabin owned by a family named Wolf.

== Biology ==
Wolfhouse Run is designated as an Exceptional Value stream. Wild trout inhabit the stream, and it is designated by the Pennsylvania Fish and Boat Commission as a wild trout stream.

== See also ==
- Lick Run (Little Fishing Creek), next tributary of Little Fishing Creek going downstream
- Devil Hole Run, the next tributary of Little Fishing Creek going upstream
- List of tributaries of Fishing Creek (North Branch Susquehanna River)
