= Lick Run (Little Fishing Creek tributary) =

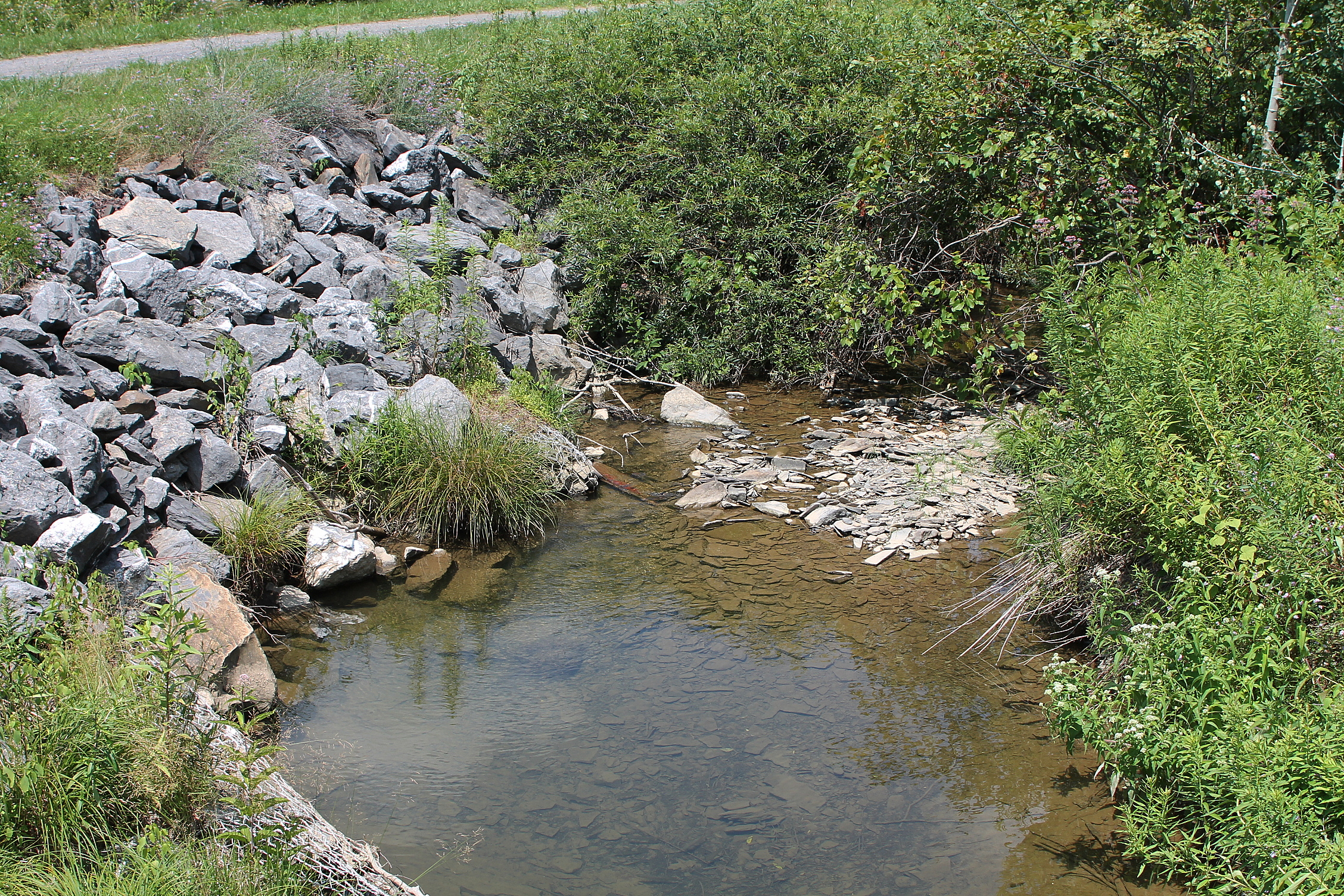
- Lick Run in its lower reaches

Physical characteristics
- Source
  - location: valley in Jordan Township, Lycoming County, Pennsylvania
  - elevation: between 1,240 and 1,260 ft (380 and 380 m)
- Mouth
  - location: Little Fishing Creek in Pine Township, Columbia County, Pennsylvania
  - coordinates: 41°09′22″N 76°31′13″W
  - elevation: 705 ft (215 m)
- Length: 5.2 mi (8.4 km)
- Basin size: 4.40 sq mi (11.4 km^{2})

Basin features
- Progression: Little Fishing Creek → Fishing Creek → Susquehanna River → Chesapeake Bay

Lick Run is a tributary of Little Fishing Creek in Lycoming County and Columbia County, in Pennsylvania, in the United States. It is approximately 5.2 miles (8.4 km) long and flows through Jordan Township in Lycoming County and Pine Township, in Columbia County. The watershed of the stream has an area of 4.40 square miles (11.4 km^{2}). The entire drainage basin is considered to be a Coldwater Fishery and a portion of the stream is considered to be Class A Wild Trout Waters. At least one bridge crosses the stream.

== Course ==
Lick Run begins in a valley in Jordan Township, Lycoming County. It flows nearly due south for almost a mile, in the process exiting Jordan Township and Lycoming County.

Upon exiting Lycoming County, Lick Run enters Pine Township, Columbia County. In this township, the stream turns south-southwest and its valley deepens. After nearly a mile, it crosses Pennsylvania Route 42 and turns nearly due south, flowing very closely parallel to Pennsylvania Route 42. The stream continues south for several miles, receiving a number of unnamed tributaries. It eventually turns south-southeast and crosses Pennsylvania Route 42. A short distance further downstream, the stream reaches its confluence with Little Fishing Creek.

Lick Run joins Little Fishing Creek 12.02 miles (19.34 km) upstream of its mouth.

== Geography and hydrology ==
The elevation near the mouth of Lick Run is 705 feet (215 m) above sea level. The elevation of the stream's source is between 1,240 feet (380 m) and 1,260 feet (380 m).

The concentration of alkalinity in Lick Run is 16 milligrams per liter.

== Watershed ==
The watershed of Lick Run has an area of 4.40 square miles (11.4 km^{2}). The stream is in the United States Geological Survey quadrangle of Lairdsville. The community of Sereno is in the vicinity of the stream.

== History and etymology ==
Lick Run was entered into the Geographic Names Information System on August 2, 1979. Its identifier in the Geographic Names Information System is 1179300.

A prestressed box beam bridge carrying Pennsylvania Route 42 over Lick Run was built in 1987. It is 1.25 miles (2.01 km) north of the community of Iola and is 44.0 feet (13.4 m) long.

Lick Run is named after a natural salt lick in its vicinity.

== Biology ==
Lick Run is considered by the Pennsylvania Fish and Boat Commission to be Class A Wild Trout Waters between its headwaters and the junction of T-645 and Pennsylvania Route 42. This stretch of the stream is 2.2 miles (3.5 km) long. It is inhabited by brook trout. The stream is also considered to be a Coldwater Fishery throughout its entire drainage basin.

== See also ==
- West Branch Run, next tributary of Little Fishing Creek going downstream
- Wolfhouse Run, next tributary of Little Fishing Creek going upstream
- List of tributaries of Fishing Creek (North Branch Susquehanna River)
