= West Branch Run =

West Branch Run West Branch Little Fishing Creek
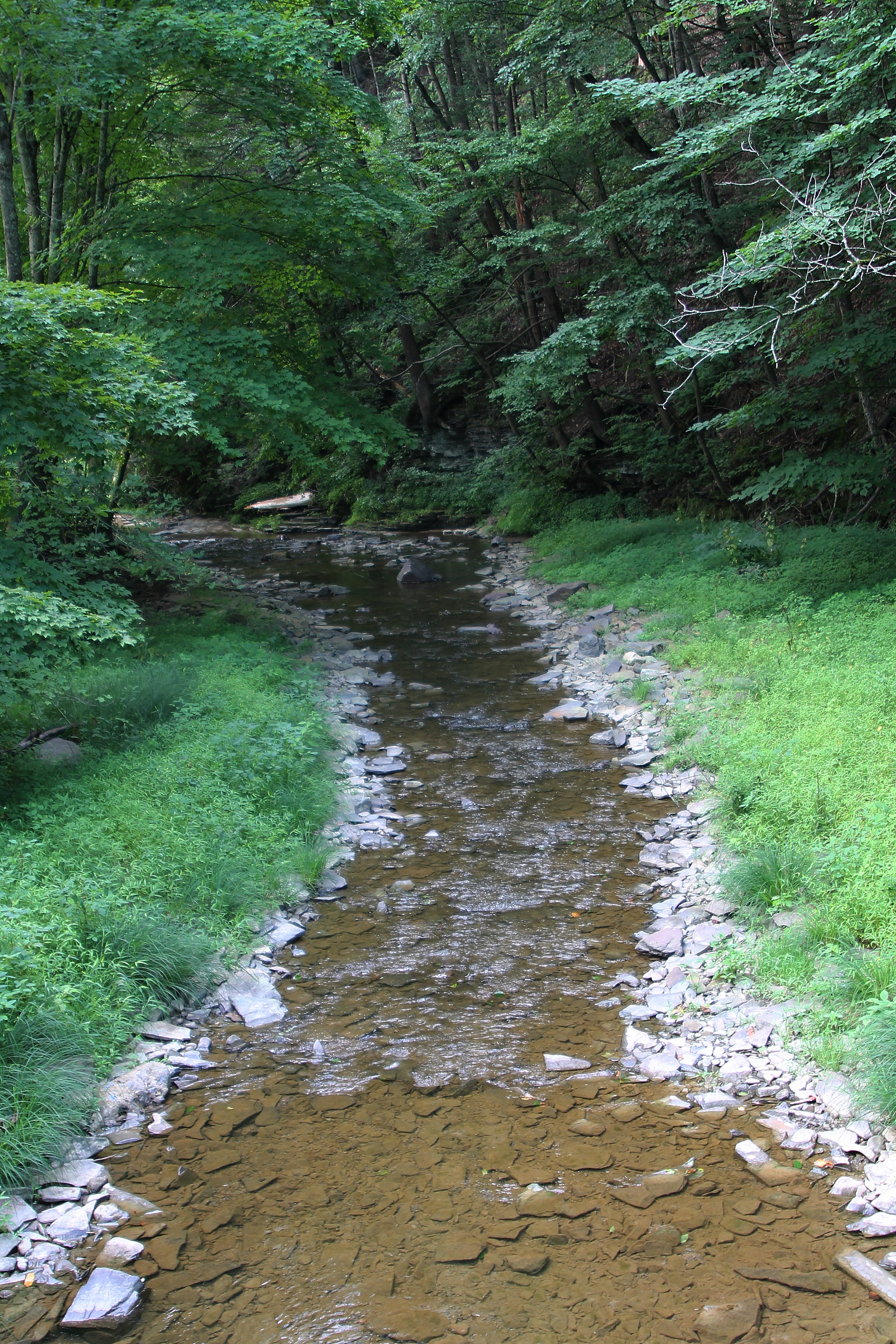
- West Branch Run looking downstream

Physical characteristics
- Source
  - location: Jordan Township, Lycoming County, Pennsylvania
  - elevation: approximately 1,260 feet (380 m)
- Mouth
  - location: Little Fishing Creek in Pine Township, Columbia County, Pennsylvania
  - coordinates: 41°08′48″N 76°31′38″W
  - elevation: 679 ft (207 m)
- Length: 7.3 mi (11.7 km)
- Basin size: 10.20 sq mi (26.4 km^{2})

Basin features
- Progression: Little Fishing Creek → Fishing Creek → Susquehanna River → Chesapeake Bay
- Tributaries
  - left: Shingle Run

West Branch Run (also known as West Branch Little Fishing Creek) is a tributary of Little Fishing Creek in Lycoming County and Columbia County, in Pennsylvania, in the United States. It is approximately 7.3 miles (11.7 km) long and flows through Jordan Township, Lycoming County and . The area of the stream's watershed is 10.20 square miles (26.4 km^{2}). The stream's only named tributary is Shingle Run. West Branch Run flows through a valley known as California Hollow, which is listed as a "locally significant site" on the Columbia County Natural Areas Inventory. The Shoemaker Covered Bridge also crosses the stream, as does at least one other bridge in Lycoming County.

== Course ==
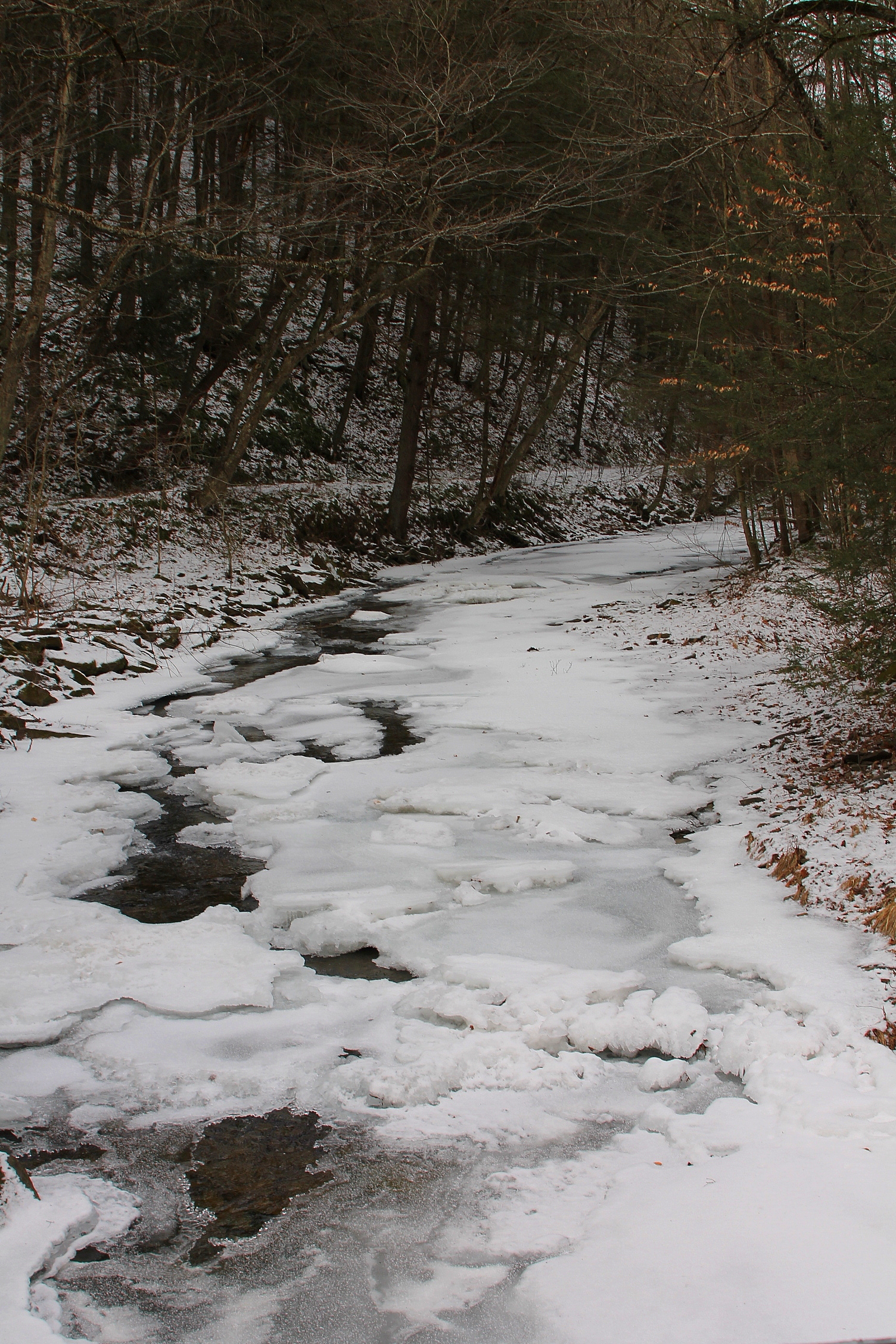
West Branch Run in January

West Branch Run begins in Jordan Township, Lycoming County and flows southwest for more than a mile. It then turns south-southwest and flows for slightly over a mile until it exits Jordan Township. Upon leaving Jordan Township, the stream enters Pine Township. Here, it turns southwest for a short distance before turning southeast near Pine Summit. The stream then flows through a fairly narrow valley known as California Hollow for some distance. At the end of the valley, it receives Shingle Run, its only named tributary, and abruptly turns south. After more than a mile, West Branch Run passes the Shoemaker Covered Bridge, crossing Pennsylvania Route 442 on the way, and turns southeast. It then crosses Pennsylvania Route 442 again and shortly afterwards reaches its confluence with Little Fishing Creek.

West Branch Run joins Little Fishing Creek 11.16 miles (17.96 km) upstream of its mouth.

=== Tributaries ===
The only named tributary of West Branch Run is Shingle Run. Shingle Run joins West Branch Run 1.82 miles (2.93 km) upstream of its mouth. Its watershed has an area of 1.63 square miles (4.2 km^{2}).

== Hydrology, geography and geology ==
The elevation of West Branch Run near its mouth is 679 feet (207 m) above sea level. At its headwaters, the stream has an elevation of approximately 1,260 feet (380 m) above sea level.

West Branch Run flows through a valley known as California Hollow in Pine Township, Columbia County.

West Branch Run has high levels of dissolved oxygen.

== Watershed ==
The watershed of West Branch Run has an area of 10.20 square miles (26.4 km^{2}). There are no roads along West Branch Run where it flows through California Hollow. The stream is one of only a few streams in Columbia County with this property.

The Shoemaker Covered Bridge was built over West Branch Run in 1884 by T.S. Christian. The bridge is 49 feet (15 m) long. It was rehabilitated in 2008. A bridge carrying the road T-720 was built over the stream in 1936. It is 26.9 feet (8.2 m) long.

== Biology ==
California Hollow, which West Branch Run flows through, is listed as a "locally significant site" on the Columbia County Natural Areas Inventory.

Hemlock and white pine inhabit the slopes of California Hollow. According to the Columbia County Natural Areas Inventory, it may have a high level of diversity among native plants and few invasive plants.

Trout reproduce naturally in West Branch Run.

== See also ==
- Spruce Run (Little Fishing Creek), next tributary of Little Fishing Creek going downstream
- Lick Run (Little Fishing Creek), next tributary of Little Fishing Creek going upstream
- List of tributaries of Fishing Creek (North Branch Susquehanna River)
