= Spruce Run (Little Fishing Creek tributary) =

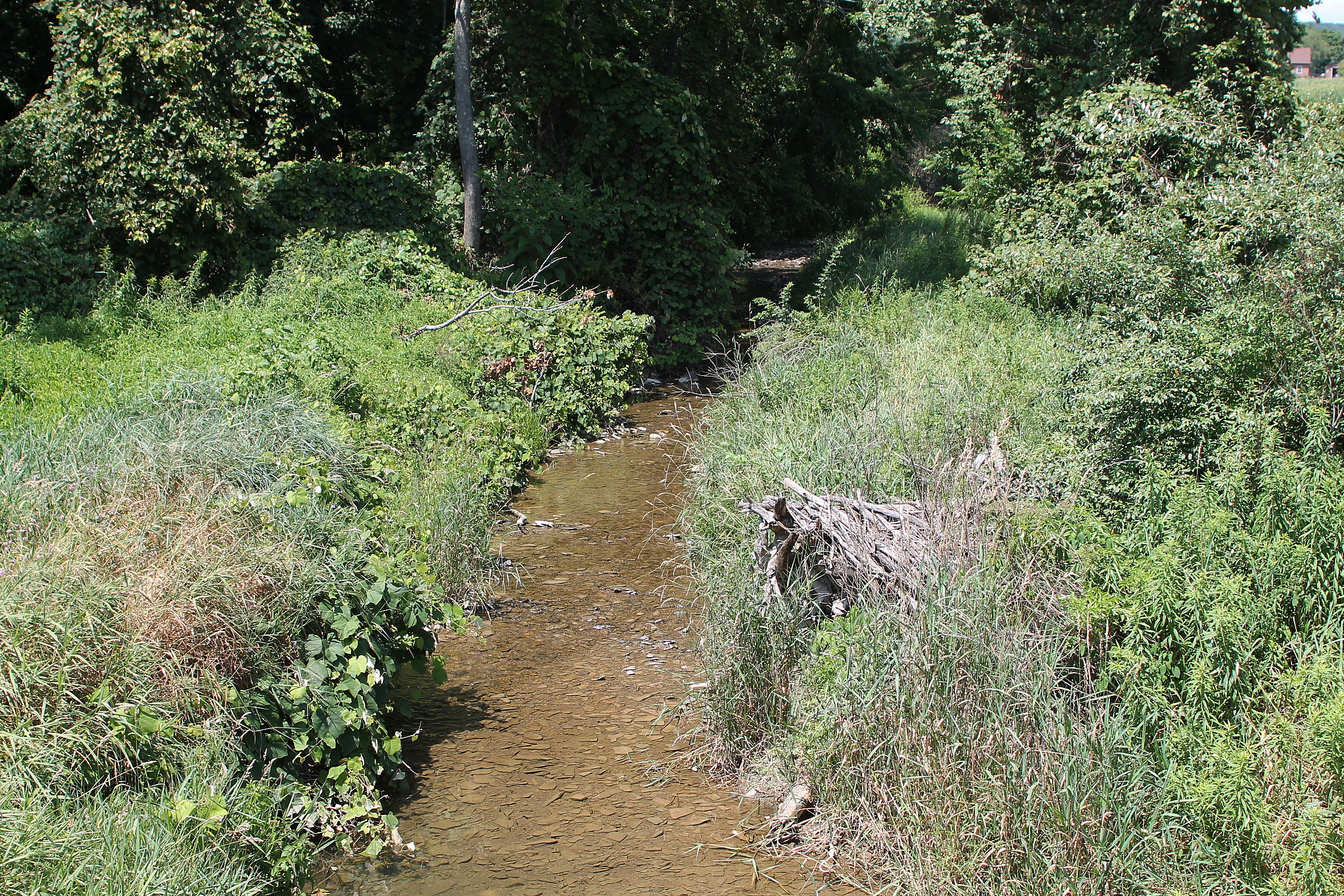
- Spruce Run at Pennsylvania Route 254, looking upstream

Physical characteristics
- Source
  - location: valley in northern Madison Township, Columbia County, Pennsylvania
  - elevation: 1,220 ft (370 m)
- Mouth
  - location: Little Fishing Creek in Madison Township, Columbia County, Pennsylvania
  - coordinates: 41°04′57″N 76°31′07″W
  - elevation: 564 ft (172 m)
- Length: 6.9 mi (11.1 km)
- Basin size: 9.80 sq mi (25.4 km^{2})

Basin features
- Progression: Little Fishing Creek → Fishing Creek → Susquehanna River → Chesapeake Bay

Spruce Run is a tributary of Little Fishing Creek in Columbia County, Pennsylvania, in the United States. It is approximately 6.9 miles (11.1 km) long and flows through Madison Township. The watershed of the stream has an area of 9.80 square miles (25.4 km^{2}). Several people settled on the stream in the 1780s and 1790s. Two bridges were built over it in the 20th century.

Spruce Run is designated as a "Locally Significant Area" in the Columbia County Natural Areas Inventory. More than 80 species of woodland herbs and numerous trees, mammals, and birds inhabit the area near the stream. The Pennsylvania State Game Lands are also in the watershed.

== Course ==
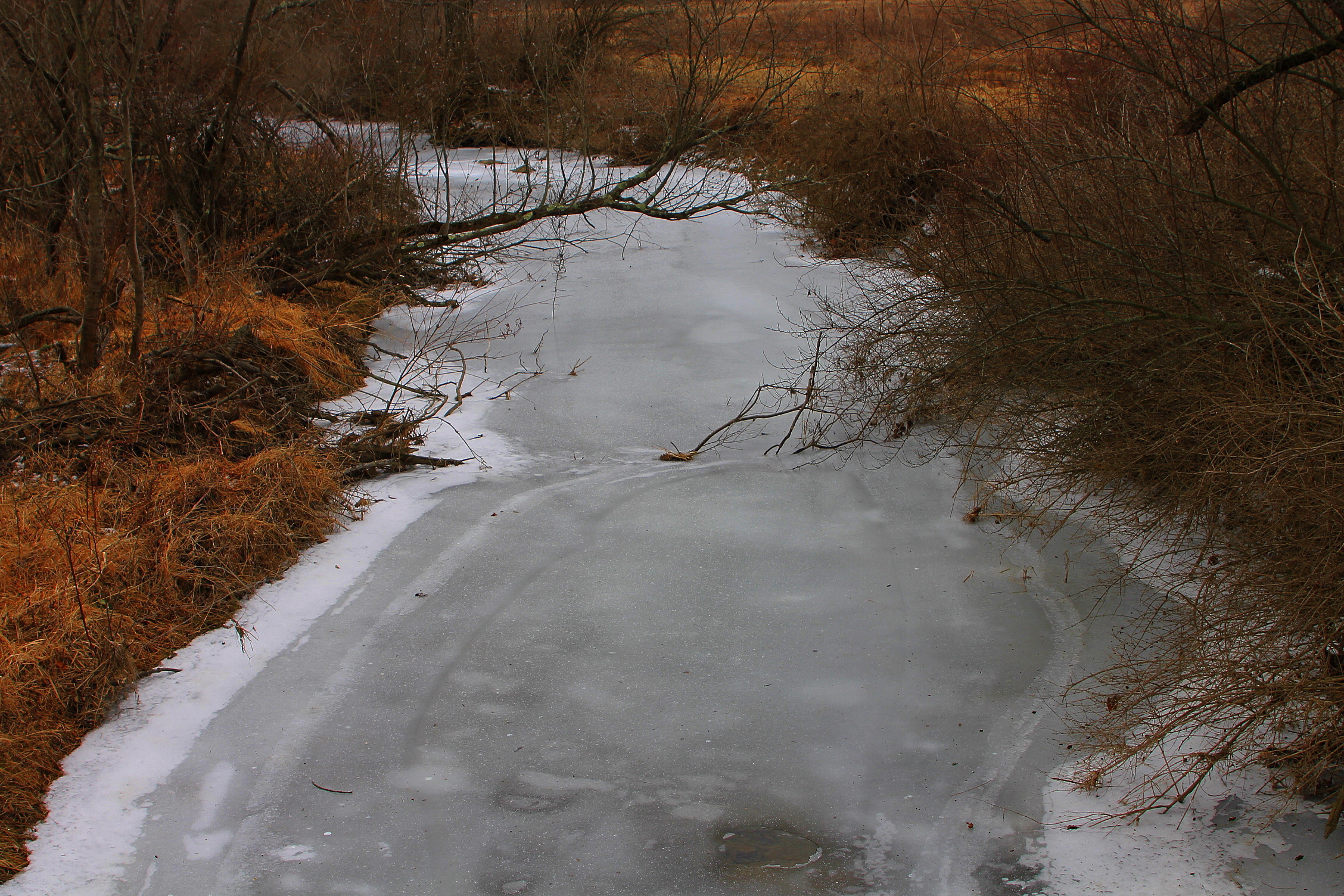
Spruce Run frozen over in January

Spruce Run begins in a valley in northern Madison Township, approximately 1 mile (1.6 km) south of the Columbia/Lycoming county line. It flows southeast for approximately a mile and then east for a slightly shorter distance, running parallel to Spruce Run Road. The stream then turns east-southeast and its valley widens considerably. Over the next few miles, the stream's valley gets broader and shallower and eventually it stops flowing parallel to Spruce Run Road. It then crosses Pennsylvania Route 254 and turns southeast for a few miles. The stream's valley becomes narrower again in its lower reaches. Shortly afterwards, it reaches its confluence with Little Fishing Creek near the community of Eyers Grove.

Spruce Run joins Little Fishing Creek 5.87 miles (9.45 km) upstream of its mouth.

== Geography and geology ==
The elevation of Spruce Run near its mouth is 564 feet (172 m) above sea level. The elevation of the stream at its source is approximately 1,220 feet (370 m) above sea level. The stream is described as a "small stream" in John Gosse Freeze's book A History of Columbia County, Pennsylvania: From the Earliest Times.

== Watershed ==
The watershed of Spruce Run has an area of 9.80 square miles (25.4 km^{2}). The upper reaches of the stream are in the Pennsylvania State Game Lands Number 226. There are no all-terrain vehicle trails along the stream and the Columbia County Natural Areas Inventory opposes the addition of any.

== History and Industries ==
A number of people settled on Spruce Run in the late 1700s. Peter Brugler, a former resident of Jersey, settled on the western side of the stream in 1779 or 1780 and James Masters, another former Jersey resident settled there in 1786. George Runyon arrived at the stream in 1796 and also settled there. In 1791, James Masters built a sawmill, chopmill, and fulling mill on the stream. This was one of the first industries in Madison township.

Two bridges that are more than 20 feet (6.1 m) long cross Spruce Run. One was built in 1932 and repaired in 2011. It is 37.1 feet (11.3 m) long. The other is a concrete tee beam bridge that was built in 1970. It is 35.1 feet (10.7 m) long.

The Columbia County Natural Areas Inventory advises against logging on Spruce Run.

== Biology ==
There are eastern hemlock and mixed hardwood forests along Spruce Run. There is also a high level of diversity of birds near the stream. Red salamanders and black-throated green warblers have the potential to inhabit the areas near the stream.

In addition to eastern hemlock, tree species that live near Spruce Run include yellow birch, black birch, basswood, sugar maple, white ash, beech, and black cherry. There are more than 80 species of woodland herbs in the area, including 15 fern species and 12 sedge species. However, invasive plants such as the multiflora rose and the autumn olive also inhabit the area near the stream.

Numerous game animals are found in the vicinity of Spruce Run. These include white-tailed deer, black bear, ring-necked pheasant, cottontail rabbit, wild turkey, and squirrels. A large number of other bird species also inhabit the area. These include five warbler species, two thrush species, one flycatcher species, and a number of other species. Ruffed grouse also occur in large numbers on Spruce Run.

Spruce Run is listed as a "Locally Significant Area" in the Columbia County Natural Areas Inventory.

== See also ==
- List of tributaries of Fishing Creek (North Branch Susquehanna River)
- West Branch Run, next tributary of Little Fishing Creek going upstream
