= Pennsylvania Route 442 =

State highway in Columbia and Lycoming counties in Pennsylvania, US

Pennsylvania Route 442

Route information
- Maintained by PennDOT
- Length: 14.701 mi (23.659 km)
- Existed: 1928–present

Major junctions
- West end: PA 405 in Muncy
- East end: PA 42 in Iola

Location
- Country: United States
- State: Pennsylvania
- Counties: Lycoming, Columbia

Highway system
- Pennsylvania State Route System; Interstate; US; State; Scenic; Legislative
← PA 441	→ PA 443

Pennsylvania Route 442 (designated by the Pennsylvania Department of Transportation as PA 442) is a 14.7-mile-long (23.7 km) state highway located in Lycoming and Columbia counties in Pennsylvania. The western terminus is at PA 405 in Muncy. The eastern terminus is at PA 42 in Iola.

== Route description ==
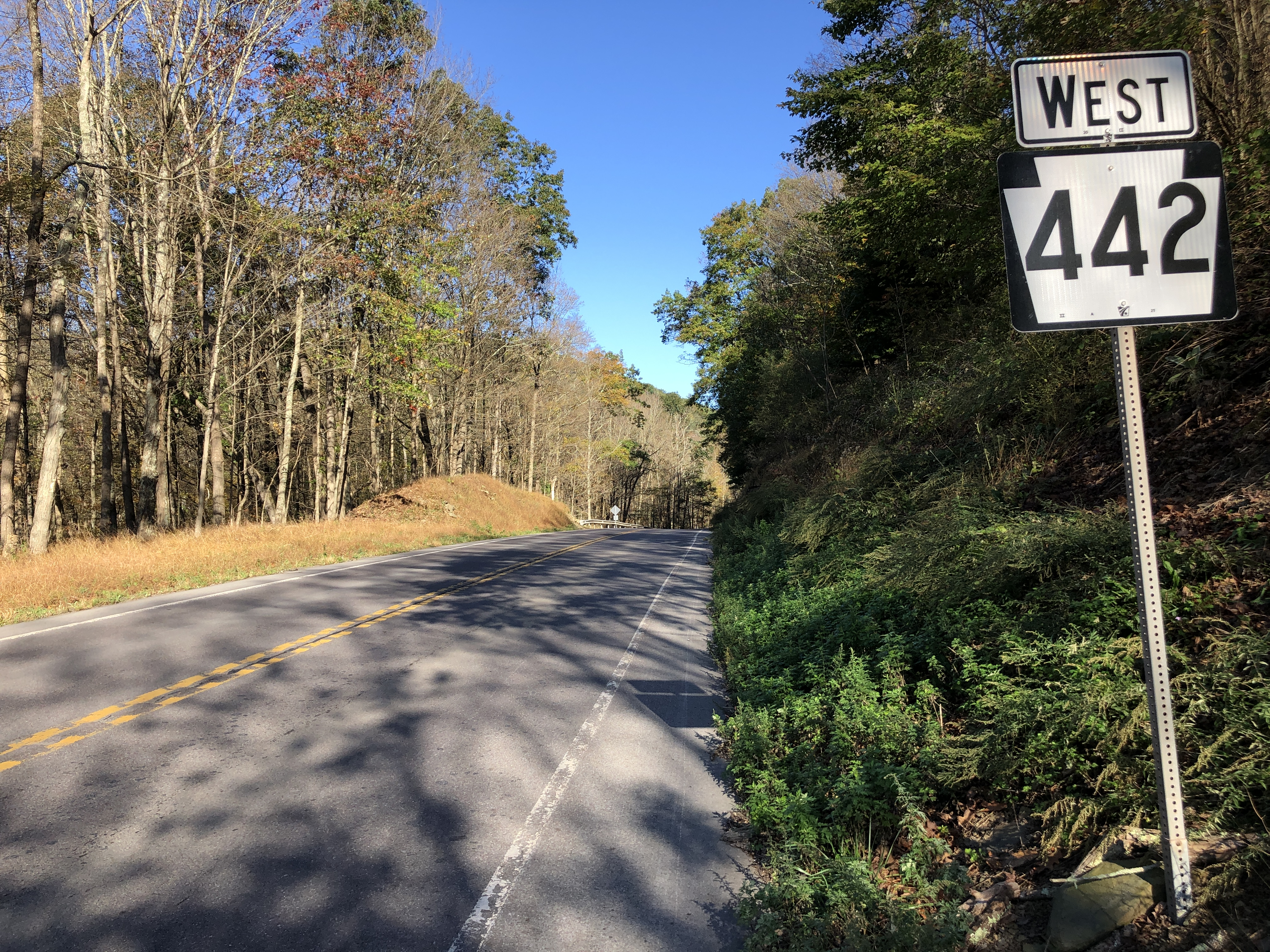
PA 442 westbound in Pine Township

PA 442 begins at a T-intersection with PA 405 and East Penn Street in the borough of Muncy. PA 442 proceeds to the southeast from PA 405, passing through a mix of residences and fields, before entering Muncy Creek Township, where it passes a park. At about that point, PA 442 makes a gradual bend to the east and passes more residences before a turn to the southeast, where it enters Clarkstown. At the edge of Clarkstown, the highway passes some large industry and soon into a long stretch of residences before leaving after the intersection with Turkey Bottom Road. PA 442 continues southeastward for a while, passing a slew of residences and fields before entering dense woods near the intersection with Rock Road. At that point, the highway makes another gradual bend, curving to the northeast, and soon east into Moreland Township. The stretch through Moreland Township is rural, with PA 442 passing through a mix of fields and woods. After the intersection with P Houseknecht Road, the highway returns to its windy nature and bends to the southeast, and soon eastward once again. After starting another stretch eastbound, PA 442 leaves Moreland Township for Franklin Township, where the highway passes south of the community of Chestnut Grove, a small stretch of houses north of PA 442. After crossing south of Chestnut Grove, PA 442 crosses the county line into Columbia County.

Upon entering Columbia County, PA 442 is immediately in Pine Township's local community of Pine Summit, a small stretch of houses north and south of the highway. The highway continues onto another elongated bend to the southeast, into the dense woods of Pine Township. This southeastern descent turns into a southward one after Shingle Run Road, where the dense woods begin to break up once again. PA 442 curves to the southeast once again, entering the outskirts of Iola, where the highway intersects with PA 42. This intersection serves as PA 442's eastern terminus.

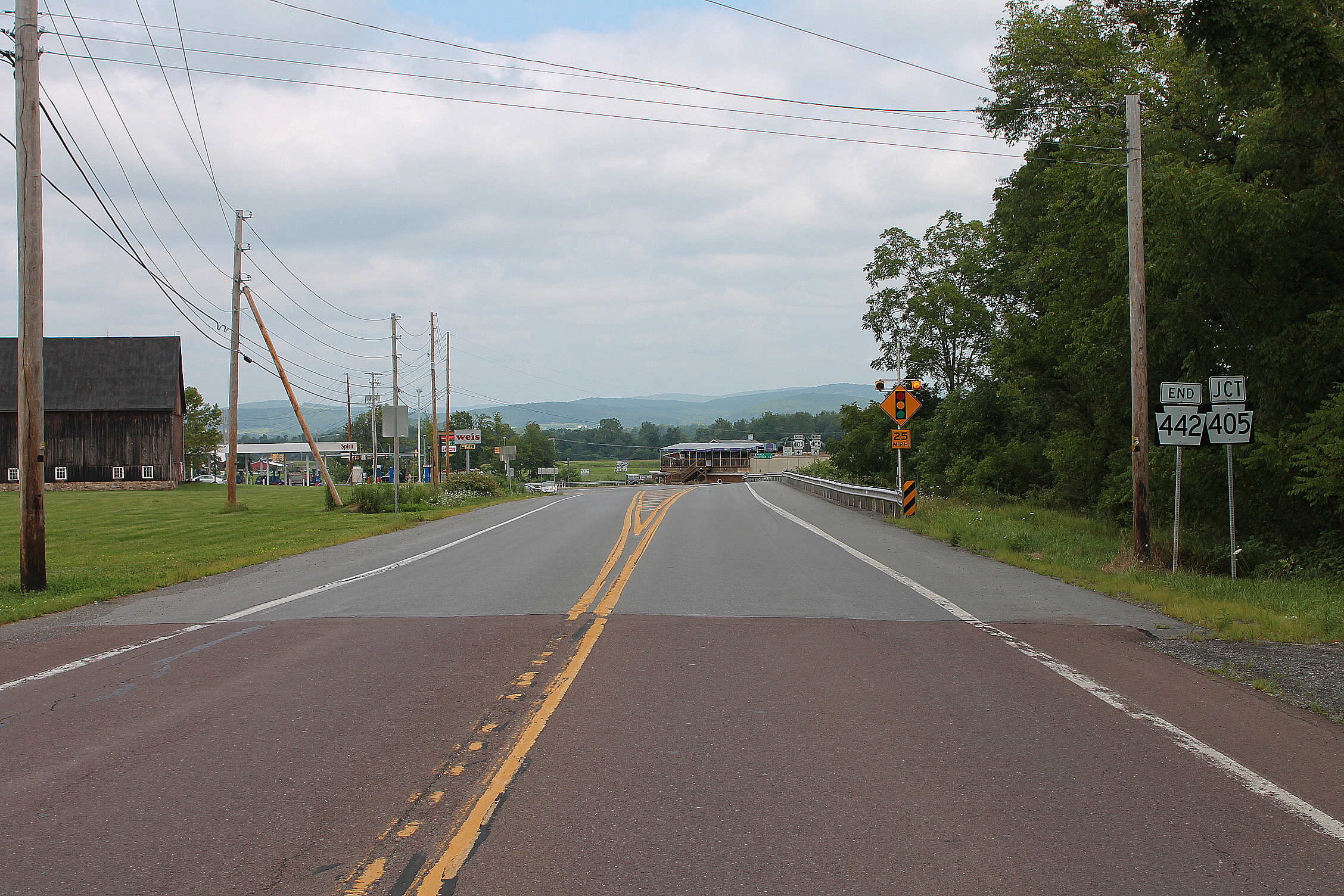
PA 442 westbound near its western terminus at PA 405 in Muncy

== Major intersections ==
County	Location	mi	km	Destinations	Notes
Lycoming	Muncy Township	0.000	0.000	PA 405 to East Penn Street / I-180 – Muncy, Hughesville	Western terminus
Columbia	Greenwood Township	14.701	23.659	PA 42 – Millville, Laporte	Eastern terminus
1.000 mi = 1.609 km; 1.000 km = 0.621 mi
