= Eyers Grove, Pennsylvania =

Unincorporated community in Pennsylvania, US

- Census-designated place
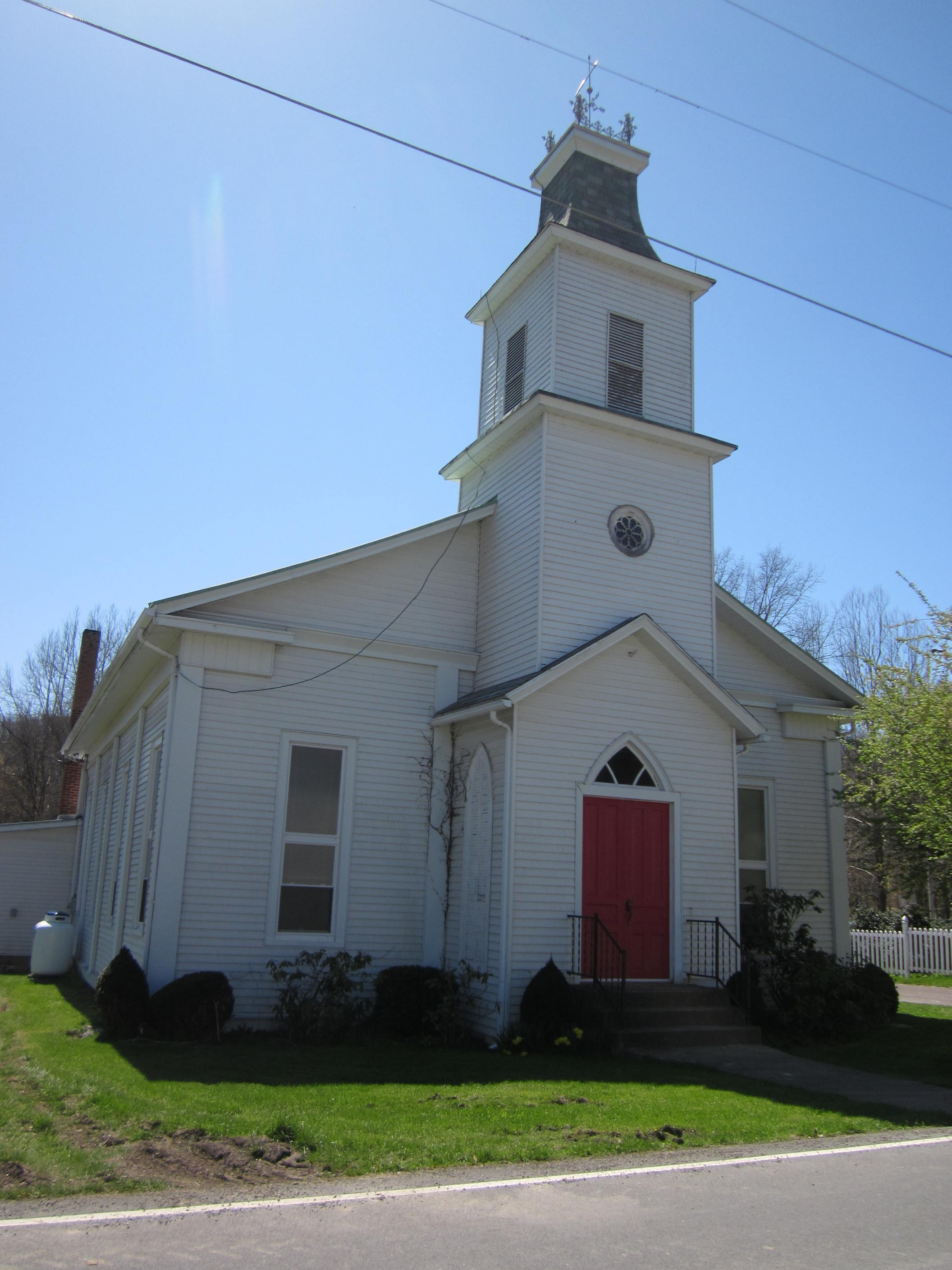

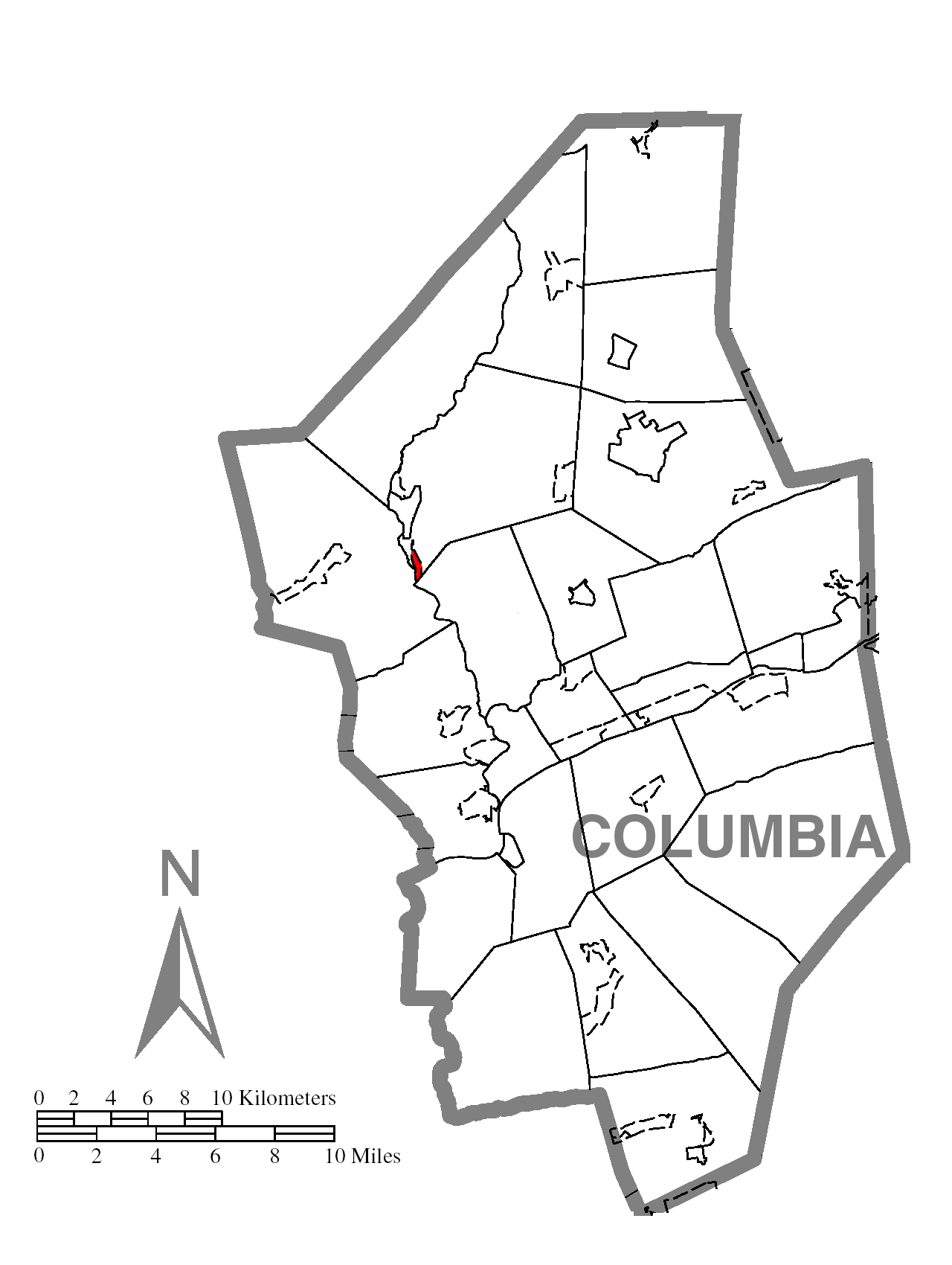
- Location within Columbia County

- Location within the U.S. state of Pennsylvania Eyers; Grove (the United States)
- Coordinates: 41°5′18″N 76°31′1″W
- Country: United States
- State: Pennsylvania
- County: Columbia
- Township: Greenwood

Area
  - Total: 0.22 sq mi (0.57 km^{2})
  - Land: 0.22 sq mi (0.56 km^{2})
  - Water: 0.0039 sq mi (0.01 km^{2})
- Elevation: 582 ft (177 m)

Population (2020)
  - Total: 102
  - Density: 470.5/sq mi (181.66/km^{2})
- Time zone: UTC-5 (Eastern (EST))
  - Summer (DST): UTC-4 (EDT)
- ZIP code: 17846
- FIPS code: 42-24448
- GNIS feature ID: 1174396

Eyers Grove is a census-designated place in Columbia County, Pennsylvania, United States. It is part of Northeastern Pennsylvania. The population was 102 at the 2020 census. It is part of the Bloomsburg-Berwick micropolitan area.

== Geography ==
Eyers Grove is located in northwestern Columbia County in the southwestern corner of Greenwood Township.

According to the U.S. Census Bureau, the CDP has a total area of 0.22 square miles (0.57 km^{2}), of which 0.004 square miles (0.01 km^{2}), or 2.04%, is water. It is along Little Fishing Creek and is served by Pennsylvania Route 42, which leads north 2 miles (3 km) to Millville and south 7 miles (11 km) to Bloomsburg, the county seat. The northern three-quarters of Eyers Grove is mostly farmland.

== Demographics ==
Historical population
Census	Pop.	Note	%±
2020	102		—
U.S. Decennial Census

At the 2000 census, there were 86 people, 32 households and 24 families residing in the CDP. The population density was 400.1 inhabitants per square mile (154.5/km^{2}). There were 34 housing units at an average density of 158.2 per square mile (61.1/km^{2}). The racial makeup of the CDP was 100.00% White.

There were 32 households, of which 25.0% had children under the age of 18 living with them, 65.6% were married couples living together, 3.1% had a female householder with no husband present, and 21.9% were non-families. 21.9% of all households were made up of individuals, and 12.5% had someone living alone who was 65 years of age or older. The average household size was 2.69 and the average family size was 3.16.

15.1% of the population were under the age of 18, 11.6% from 18 to 24, 33.7% from 25 to 44, 23.3% from 45 to 64, and 16.3% who were 65 years of age or older. The median age was 41 years. For every 100 females, there were 100.0 males. For every 100 females age 18 and over, there were 108.6 males.

The median household income was $38,125 and the median family income was $41,875. Males had a median income of $29,375 vand females $16,875. The per capita income was $13,906. There were 11.1% of families and 9.5% of the population living below the poverty line, including no under eighteens and 33.3% of those over 64.

== Education ==
The school district is Millville Area School District.
