= Creasyville Covered Bridge =

- U.S. National Register of Historic Places
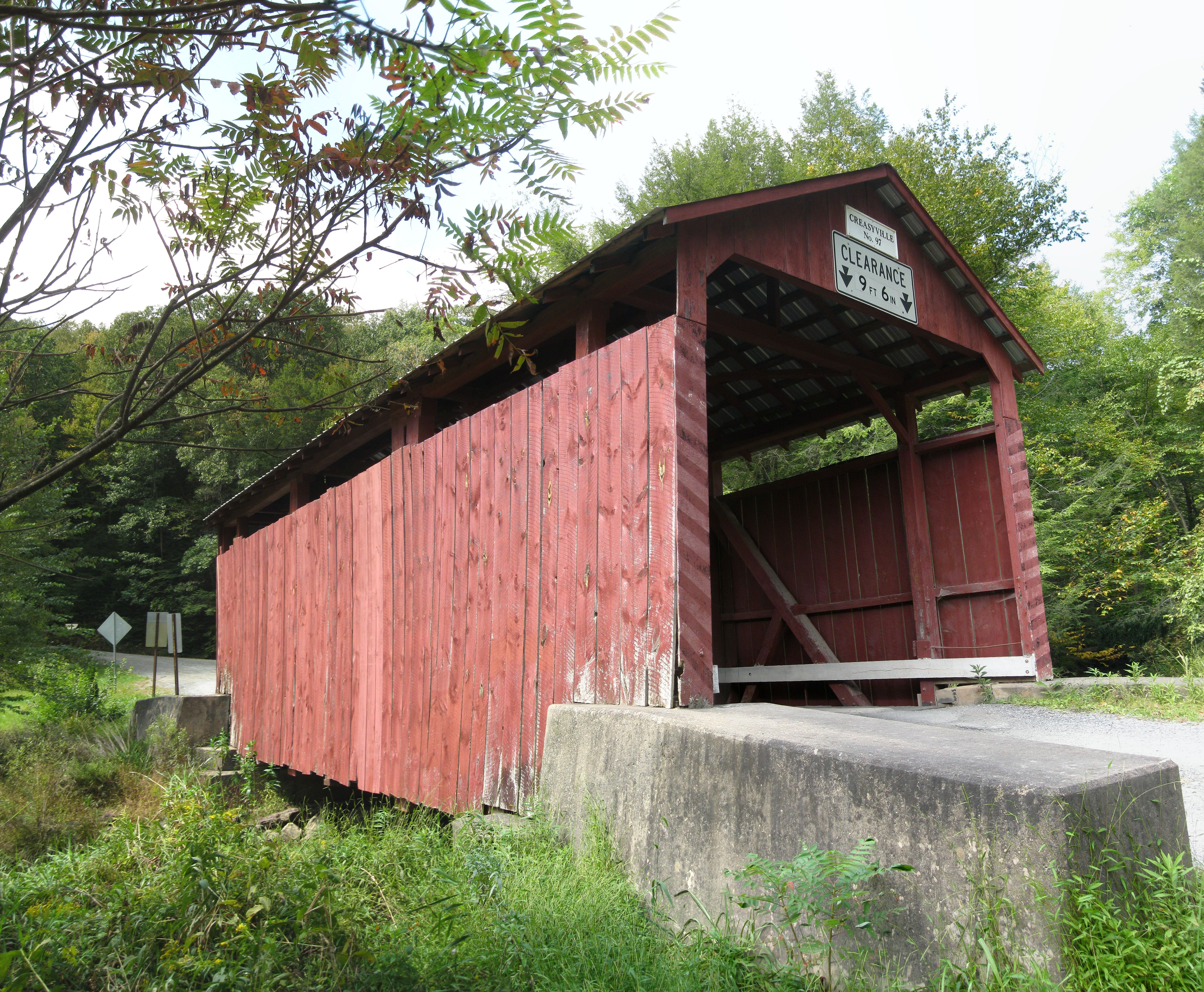
- The bridge in September 2012

- Location within Pennsylvania Location within the United States
- Location: Pennsylvania Route 685, northeast of Millville, Jackson Township and Pine Township, Pennsylvania
- Coordinates: 41°12′43″N 76°27′42″W
- Area: 0.1 acres (0.040 ha)
- Built: 1881
- Built by: T.S. Christian
- Architectural style: Queen Post
- MPS: Covered Bridges of Columbia and Montour Counties TR
- NRHP reference No.: 79003198
- Added to NRHP: November 29, 1979

The Creasyville Covered Bridge is a historic wooden covered bridge located at Jackson Township and Pine Township in Columbia County, Pennsylvania, United States. It is a 44.5-foot-long (13.6 m), Queen Post Truss bridge over Little Fishing Creek constructed in 1881. It is one of 28 historic covered bridges in Columbia and Montour Counties. At only 44 feet 6 inches long, this is the shortest covered bridge in Columbia County.

It was listed on the National Register of Historic Places in 1979.
