= Sam Eckman Covered Bridge No. 92 =

- U.S. National Register of Historic Places
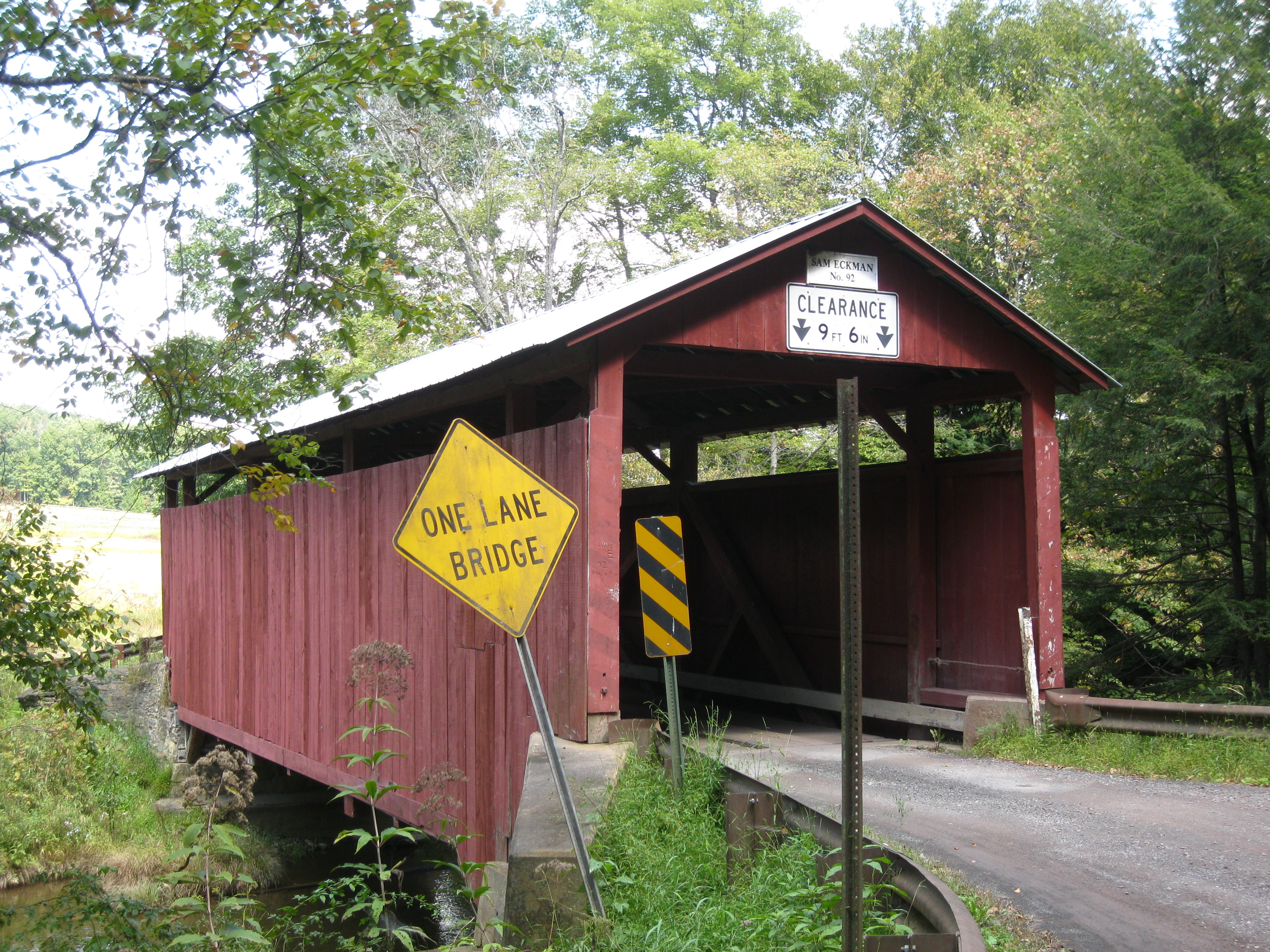
- The bridge in September 2012

- Location within Pennsylvania Location within the United States
- Location: Pennsylvania Route 548, northeast of Millville, Greenwood Township and Pine Township, Pennsylvania
- Coordinates: 41°10′39″N 76°29′26″W
- Area: 0.1 acres (0.040 ha)
- Built: 1876
- Built by: Joseph Redline
- Architectural style: Warren Truss
- MPS: Covered Bridges of Columbia and Montour Counties TR
- NRHP reference No.: 79003183
- Added to NRHP: November 29, 1979

The Sam Eckman Covered Bridge No. 92 is a historic wooden covered bridge located at Greenwood Township and Pine Township in Columbia County, Pennsylvania. It is a 65.1-foot-long (19.8 m), Warren Truss bridge constructed in 1876. It crosses Little Fishing Creek. It is one of 28 historic covered bridges in Columbia and Montour Counties.

It was listed on the National Register of Historic Places in 1979.
