= Iola, Pennsylvania =

Unincorporated community in Pennsylvania, US

Iolа, Pennsylvania
- Census-designated place
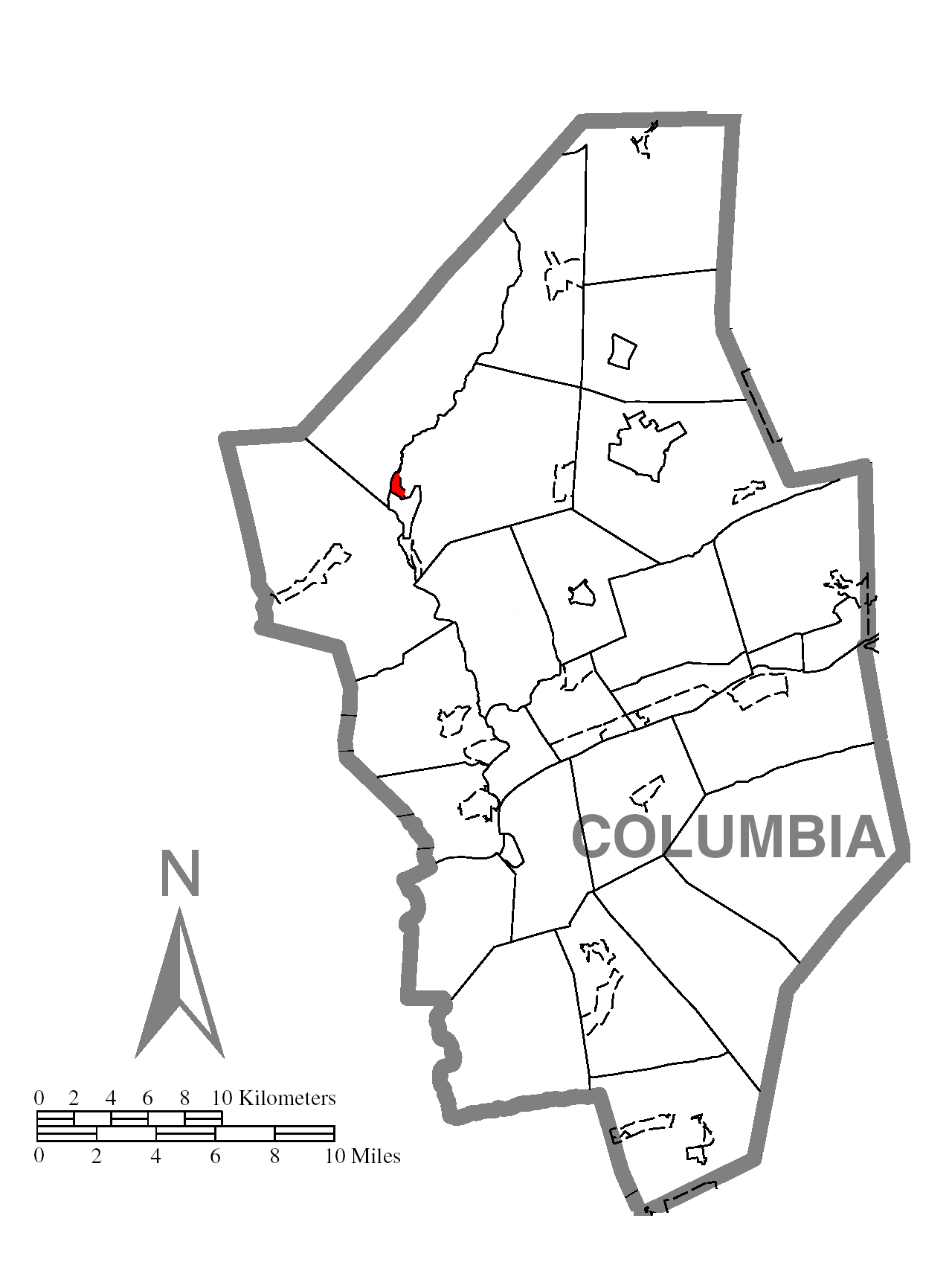
- Location within Columbia County

- Location within the U.S. state of Pennsylvania Iola (the United States)
- Coordinates: 41°7′56″N 76°32′2″W
- Country: United States
- State: Pennsylvania
- County: Columbia
- Township: Greenwood

Area
  - Total: 0.27 sq mi (0.71 km^{2})
  - Land: 0.27 sq mi (0.70 km^{2})
  - Water: 0.0039 sq mi (0.01 km^{2})
- Elevation: 653 ft (199 m)

Population (2020)
  - Total: 154
  - Density: 567.2/sq mi (218.99/km^{2})
- Time zone: UTC-5 (Eastern (EST))
  - Summer (DST): UTC-4 (EDT)
- ZIP code: 17846
- FIPS code: 42-37024
- GNIS feature ID: 1177825

Iola is a census-designated place in Columbia County, Pennsylvania, United States. It is part of Northeastern Pennsylvania. The population was 154 at the 2020 census. It is part of the Bloomsburg-Berwick micropolitan area.

== History ==
A milling business was set up in Iola in the winter of 1828. A church was built in the community in 1850.

== Geography ==
Iola is located in northwestern Columbia County at 41°7′56″N 76°32′2″W (41.132269, -76.533969), along the western edge of Greenwood Township. Iola is bordered to the south by the borough of Millville and to the west by Little Fishing Creek, across which is Pine Township. According to the United States Census Bureau, the CDP has a total area of 0.3 square miles (0.7 km^{2}), all land.

Pennsylvania Route 42 runs north–south through the center of town, and Pennsylvania Route 442 branches to the northwest at the northern end of town. The CDP is mostly flat, with some rolling hills in the eastern section. Much of Iola, especially in the northwest and southeast, is farmland.

== Demographics ==
Historical population
Census	Pop.	Note	%±
2020	154		—
U.S. Decennial Census

As of the census of 2000, there were 129 people, 59 households, and 34 families residing in the CDP. The population density was 484.1 inhabitants per square mile (186.9/km^{2}). There were 66 housing units at an average density of 247.7 per square mile (95.6/km^{2}). The racial makeup of the CDP was 99.22% White and 0.78% Asian.

There were 59 households, out of which 25.4% had children under the age of 18 living with them, 47.5% were married couples living together, 6.8% had a female householder with no husband present, and 40.7% were non-families. 35.6% of all households were made up of individuals, and 10.2% had someone living alone who was 65 years of age or older. The average household size was 2.19 and the average family size was 2.80.

In the CDP, the population was spread out, with 21.7% under the age of 18, 6.2% from 18 to 24, 31.8% from 25 to 44, 24.8% from 45 to 64, and 15.5% who were 65 years of age or older. The median age was 36 years. For every 100 females, there were 81.7 males. For every 100 females age 18 and over, there were 83.6 males.

The median income for a household in the CDP was $28,125, and the median income for a family was $36,563. Males had a median income of $28,125 versus $25,938 for females. The per capita income for the CDP was $16,211. There were 8.6% of families and 7.0% of the population living below the poverty line, including no under eighteens and 21.4% of those over 64.

== Education ==
The school district is Millville Area School District.
