= Millville Friends Meeting House =

Coordinates: 41.1231°N 76.5260°W

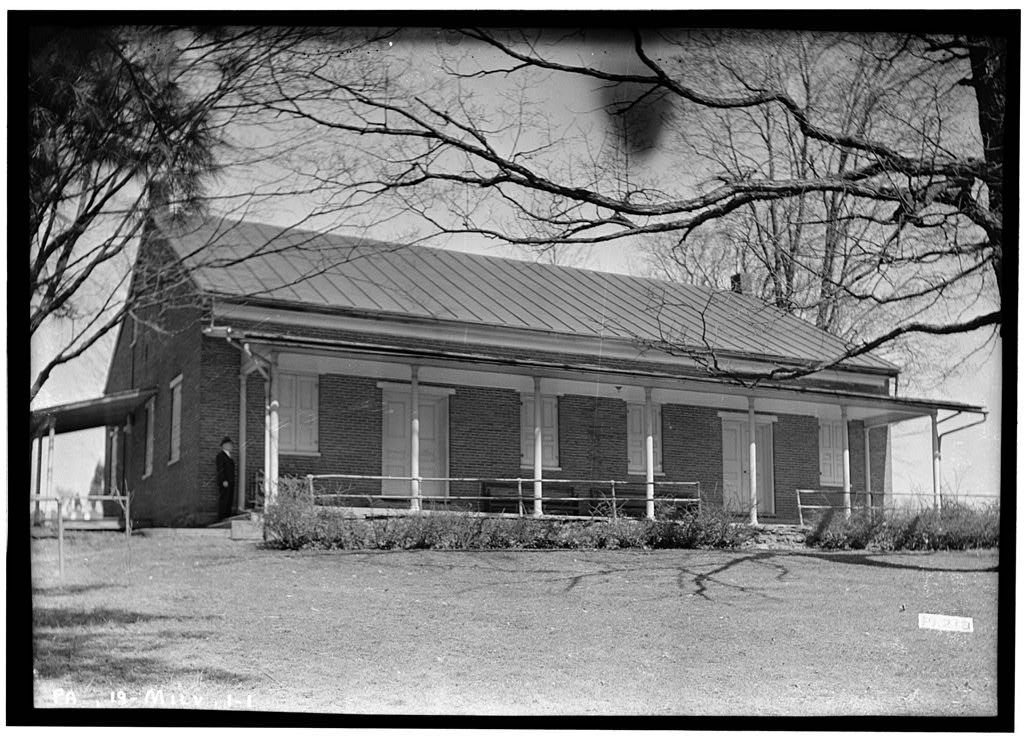
Image of Millville Friends Meeting House, circa 1936, HABS PA,19-MILV,1--1.

Millville Friends Meeting House is a meeting house located in Millville, Pennsylvania, and serves as a place of worship for the Religious Society of Friends, also known as Quakers. It is affiliated with the Greenwood Friends School.

== History ==
Erected in 1795, the house recently celebrated its 200th anniversary and has a history of continuous use. It was originally constructed with two rooms, one for worship services and the other for school instruction. Descendants of John Eves, the founder of the town of Millville, and a Carlisle Indian student are buried in the on-site Quaker graveyard.

== See also ==
- Catawissa Friends Meetinghouse
- Roaring Creek Friends Meeting House
