= Jud Christie Covered Bridge No. 95 =

- U.S. National Register of Historic Places
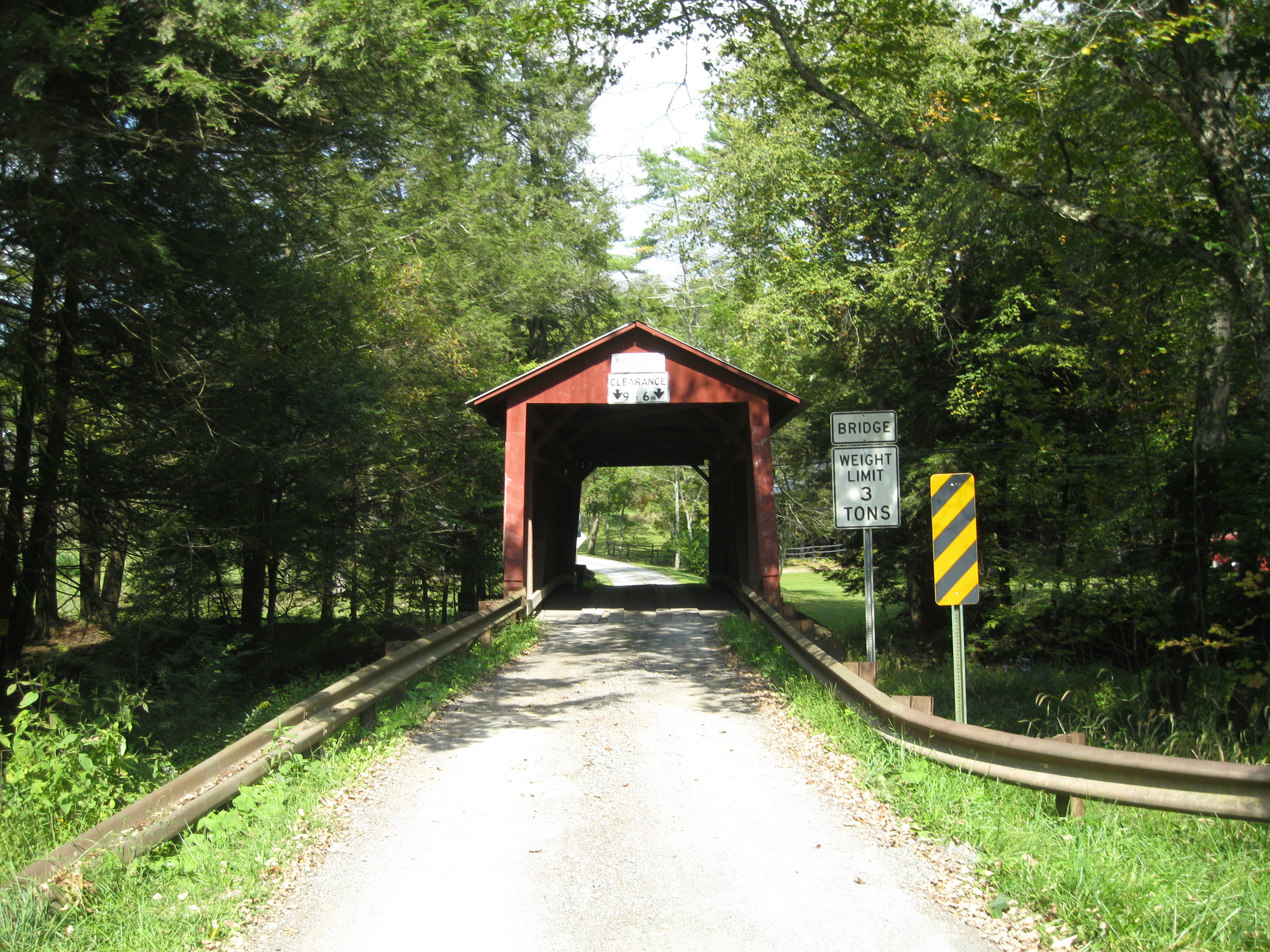
- The bridge in September 2012

- Location within Pennsylvania Location within the United States
- Location: Pennsylvania Route 685, northeast of Millville, Jackson Township and Pine Township, Pennsylvania
- Coordinates: 41°11′45″N 76°28′24″W
- Area: 0.5 acres (0.20 ha)
- Built: 1876
- Built by: William L. Lanning
- Architectural style: Queen Post
- MPS: Covered Bridges of Columbia and Montour Counties TR
- NRHP reference No.: 79003184
- Added to NRHP: November 29, 1979

The Jud Christie Covered Bridge No. 95 (also known as the Jud Christian Covered Bridge) is a historic wooden covered bridge located at Jackson Township and Pine Township in Columbia County, Pennsylvania. It is a 63-foot-long (19 m), Queen post truss bridge constructed in 1876. It crosses the Little Fishing Creek. It is one of 28 historic covered bridges in Columbia and Montour Counties.

It was listed on the National Register of Historic Places in 1979.
