= Little Fishing Creek =

Creek in Columbia County, Pennsylvania

Coordinates: 41°01′07″N 76°28′33″W

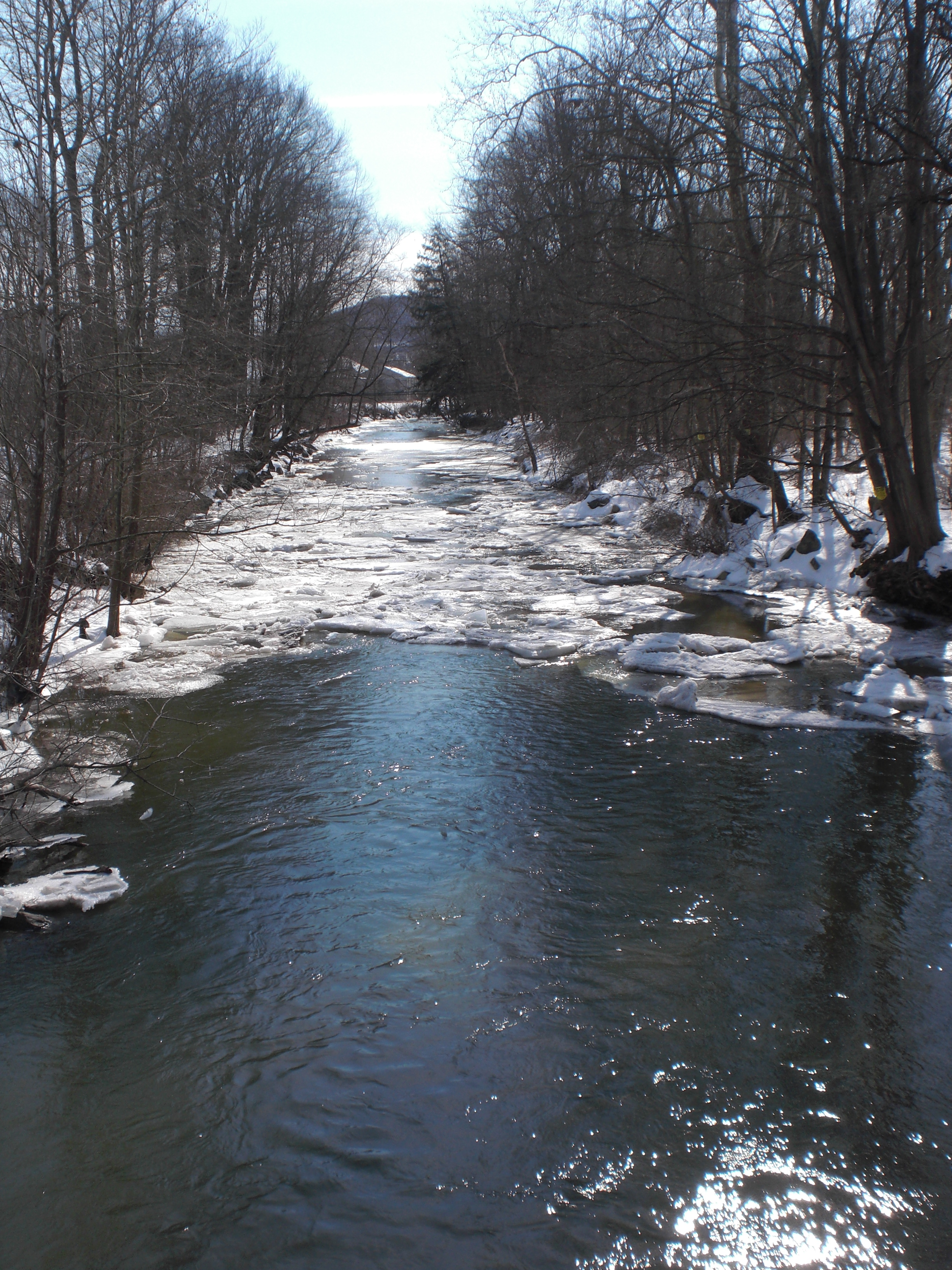
- Little Fishing Creek looking downstream in Millville

Physical characteristics
- Source
  - location: Huckleberry Mountain in Davidson Township, Sullivan County, Pennsylvania
  - elevation: between 1,620 and 1,640 feet (490 and 500 m)
- Mouth
  - location: Fishing Creek in Mount Pleasant Township, Columbia County, Pennsylvania and Bloomsburg, Pennsylvania
  - elevation: 479 ft (146 m)
- Length: 23.1 mi (37.2 km)
- Basin size: 68.1 sq mi (176 km^{2})

Basin features
- Progression: Fishing Creek → Susquehanna River → Chesapeake Bay
- Tributaries
  - right: Little Brier Run, Devil Hole Run, Wolfhouse Run, Lick Run, West Branch Run, Spruce Run

Little Fishing Creek is a tributary of Fishing Creek in Sullivan County, Lycoming County, and Columbia County, in Pennsylvania, in the United States. It is approximately 23.5 miles (37.8 km) long and flows through eight townships. The watershed of the creek has an area of 68.1 square miles (176 km^{2}). The creek has six named tributaries, of which the largest are Spruce Run and West Branch Run.

There are at least two major rock formations in the watershed of Little Fishing Creek: the Chemung Formation and the Hamilton Group. The creek's watershed includes part of the Greenwood Valley. Much of the watershed is forested and major roads in it include Pennsylvania Route 42. The first European settler first arrived in the vicinity of the creek during the 1760s or 1770s, with other settlers arriving in the 1790s. A number of sawmills, woolen mills, and tanneries historically operated on the creek. A number of covered bridges have also been built over it and there were historically some railroads in the watershed.

Little Fishing Creek is considered to be an Exceptional Value stream for part of its length. One of its tributaries is considered to be Class A Wild Trout Waters for part of its length, as is part of the creek itself. However, the creek is considered to be impaired by pathogens for a portion of its length. Parts of the creek are suitable for canoeing on.

== Course ==
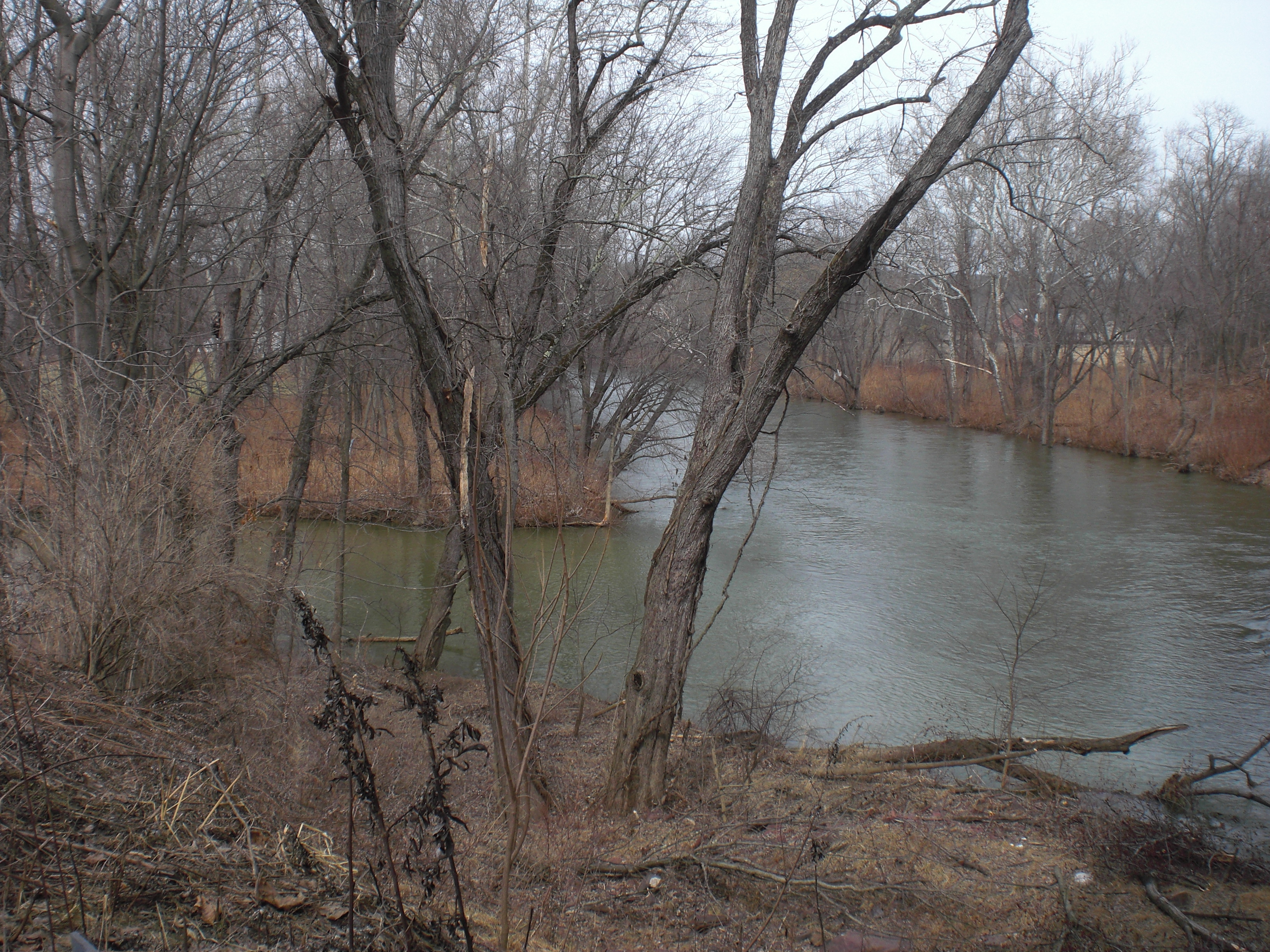
The mouth of Little Fishing Creek (left)

Little Fishing Creek begins on Huckleberry Mountain in Davidson Township, Sullivan County. It flows south and exits Davidson Township and Sullivan County within a few tenths of a mile. Upon exiting Sullivan County, the creek enters Jordan Township, Lycoming County. In this township, it continues south before turning southeast and crossing Pennsylvania Route 118 and Pennsylvania Route 239. Downstream, it exits Jordan Township and Lycoming County.

Upon exiting Lycoming County, Little Fishing Creek enters Jackson Township, in Columbia County. It flows southeast along the western border of Jackson Township and then turns southwest, following the border, and passes Huckleberry Ridge. The creek then leaves Jackson Township and continues flowing along the border between Pine Township and Greenwood Township. After several miles, it starts flowing parallel to Pennsylvania Route 42 receives the tributary Branch Run. The creek then passes by the western edge of Millville and continues flowing south roughly parallel to Pennsylvania Route 42. Downstream of Millville, it crosses Pennsylvania Route 254. Several miles downstream, it passes Eyers Grove, where it receives the tributary Spruce Run and leaves behind Greenwood Township. The creek then flows along the western border of Mount Pleasant Township and continues to flow alongside Pennsylvania Route 42. After some distance, the creek passes Mordansville and reaches the southern border of Mount Pleasant Township several miles later. Little Fishing Creek enters Fishing Creek at the border between Mount Pleasant Township and Bloomsburg.

Little Fishing Creek joins Fishing Creek 3.86 miles (6.21 km) upstream of its mouth.

=== Tributaries ===
All but one of the tributaries of the Little Fishing Creek upstream of the United States Geological Survey stream gauge empty into it from the right. The creek has a number of small tributaries in ravines in Pine Township. Little Fishing Creek's named tributaries include Spruce Run, West Branch Run, Lick Run, Wolfhouse Run, Devil Hole Run, and Little Brier Run. Spruce Run and West Branch Run are the largest, with watershed areas of 9.80 square miles (25.4 km^{2}) and 10.20 square miles (26.4 km^{2}), respectively.

== Hydrology ==
A total of 2.4 miles (3.9 km) of Little Fishing Creek are considered impaired due to pathogens of an unknown source.

At Millville, the "caution stage" for flooding is 7 feet (2.1 m) and the flood stage is 10 feet (3.0 m). At Eyers Grove, the "caution stage" is 5 feet (1.5 m), except in areas with levees, where it is 7 feet (2.1 m). The flood stage is 7 feet (2.1 m) in areas without levees and 10 feet (3.0 m) in areas with them. The average annual rate of precipitation in the watershed of Little Fishing Creek ranges from 35 to 45 inches (89 to 114 cm).

The annual recharge levels of Little Fishing Creek at Eyers Grove ranged from 6 to 23 inches (15 to 58 cm) between 1941 and 1957. March, April, and February produced the most recharge of any month on average, contributing 18.2 percent, 13.7 percent, and 12.5 percent of the annual recharge, respectively. August produced the least recharge of any month on average, contributing 1.6 percent of the annual recharge. Between its headwaters and Talmar Road, the concentration of alkalinity in the waters of Little Fishing Creek is 11 milligrams per liter.

== Geography and geology ==
The elevation near the mouth of Little Fishing Creek is 479 feet (146 m) above sea level. The elevation of the creek's source is between 1,620 feet (490 m) and 1,640 feet (500 m) above sea level. Little Fishing Creek serves as a border between five pairs of townships in Columbia County: Jackson Township and Pine Township, Greenwood Township and Pine Township, Greenwood Township and Madison Township, Mount Pleasant Township and Madison Township, and Mount Pleasant Township and Hemlock Township.

One type of soil series found in the vicinity of Little Fishing Creek is the Middlebury Series. This soil series ranges from deep and fairly well-drained to poorly-drained alluvial soil. It consists of Tioga soils and Holly soils. All of the rock in the creek's watershed upstream of the United States Geological Survey's stream gauge is shale or sandstone. A fairly narrow band of rock of the Hamilton Group is located near the creek. Rock outcroppings of the Chemung Formation are visible in Hemlock Township, approximately 1 mile (1.6 km) upstream of Fishing Creek. Rock formations consisting of shale and sandstone are present in the vicinity of the creek. Numerous riffles occur on parts of Little Fishing Creek. There are also strainers in places.

The Greenwood Valley runs between Little Fishing Creek and Green Creek. Additionally, the Milton axis crosses Little Fishing Creek in Pine Township. A steep ridge known as the "Divide" separates the creek's watershed from that of Chillisquaque Creek. The topography of Little Fishing Creek is described as "rough and hilly" in a 1921 book. The watershed contains narrow valleys with steep and high hills surrounding them. The creek's channel is sinuous.

== Watershed ==
The watershed of Little Fishing Creek has an area of 68.1 square miles (176 km^{2}). The creek's mouth is in the United States Geological Survey quadrangle of Bloomsburg. However, its source is in the quadrangle of Elk Grove. The creek also passes through the quadrangles of Benton, Lairdsville, and Millville.

The watershed of Little Fishing Creek is considerably longer than it is wide. The drainage basin area of the creek upstream of the stream gauge at Eyers Grove is 56.5 square miles. Most of the watershed is in Columbia County. However, a substantial part of the northwestern portion of the watershed is in Lycoming County and the northernmost part of it is in Sullivan County. The watershed is part of the Lower North Branch Susquehanna River drainage basin.

Much of the watershed of Little Fishing Creek upstream of the stream gauge on it is forest. There is also agricultural land, especially in the northwestern and southern parts of the watershed and small areas of developed land in the watershed's southern section. 64.5 percent of the land in the watershed upstream of Eyers Grove is forested land and 34.7 percent is agricultural land. 0.7 percent of the land is developed and the remaining 0.2 percent has other uses.

Pennsylvania Route 42 follows Little Fishing Creek for a significant portion of its length. However, the creek is relatively far from it between Millville and Eyers Grove. Major communities in the watershed of the creek include Millville, Iola, Eyers Grove, and Mordansville. Between its headwaters and Talmar Road, 6 percent of the creek's length is on open public land. 44 percent is on closed private land and 50 percent is on open private land.

== History, industries, and etymology ==
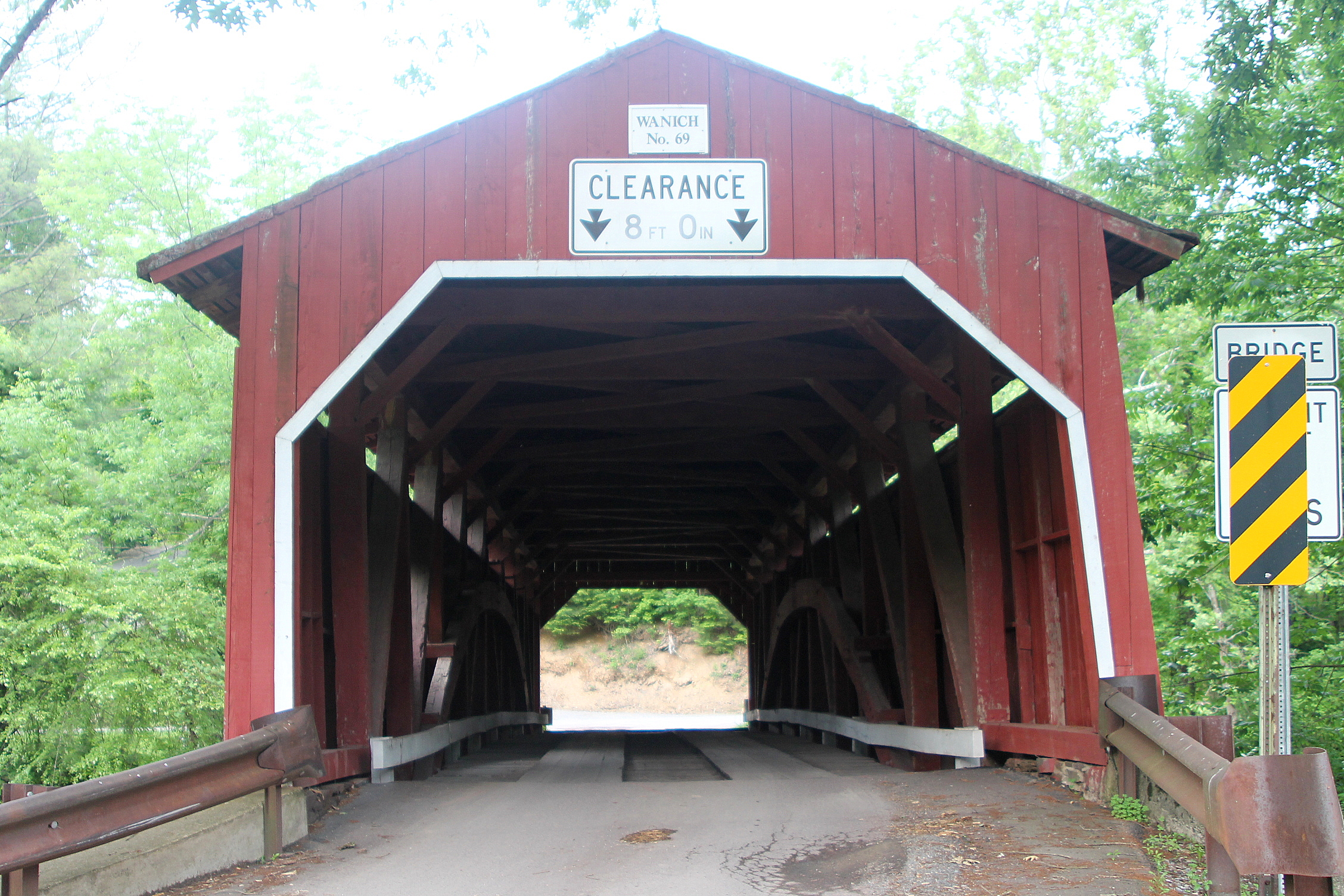
Wanich Covered Bridge No. 69

Little Fishing Creek was entered into the Geographic Names Information System on August 2, 1979. Its identifier in the Geographic Names Information System is 1179545. The creek is named for the fact that it is smaller than Fishing Creek, which it is a tributary of. Little fishing Creek is also known as Hemlock Creek. This variant name appears in a 1982 map of Columbia County published by the Pennsylvania Department of Transportation.

John Eves likely settled in the valley of Little Fishing Creek before 1774 and possibly as early as 1769. In 1778, Moses Van Campen led a scouting part past from Fort Wheeler to Chillisquaque Creek via Little Fishing Creek. The headwaters of Little Fishing Creek were uninhabited considerably after the valleys of Greenwood and Jerseytown were inhabited.

Several covered bridges cross Little Fishing Creek. The Creasyville Covered Bridge (formerly known as the Derr Bridge) is a Queenpost truss covered bridge that was built over Little Fishing Creek in 1881 for a cost of $301.25. It is 44.5 feet (13.6 m) long and crosses the creek north of Millville and Iola. The Jud Christie Covered Bridge No. 95, which is also a Queenpost truss bridge, crosses the creek between Jackson Township and Pine Township. It is 53 feet (16 m) long and was built in 1876 for $239.00. The Sam Eckman Covered Bridge No. 92 crosses the creek between Pine Township and Greenwood Township and was built in 1876 for $498.00. It is 66 feet (20 m) long. The Wanich Covered Bridge No. 69 was built in 1844 for $500.00 and is 98 feet (30 m) long.

Other bridges have also been built over Little Fishing Creek. A steel truss bridge was built over it in 1896. A bridge carrying Pennsylvania Route 254 over the creek was built in 1930 and a bridge carrying Pennsylvania Route 42 over the creek was built in 1939, as was one other bridge. Five other bridges were built in the 1940s and 1950s, including another bridge built in 1955 and carrying Pennsylvania Route 42. Several more bridges were built in the 1960s. The newest bridges over the creek were constructed in 1974, 1990, and 2009.

John Mordan settled on Little Fishing Creek in Mount Pleasant Township in the 1790s. He also built the first sawmill in Mount Pleasant Township on Little Fishing Creek. When numerous other settlers arrived in the vicinity of Mordan's mill, the area became known as Mordansville. There was also once an obscure gristmill on an island on the creek. The Catawissa Railroad historically went up the valley of the creek.

Little Fishing Creek serves as a water supply source for nearby communities such as Millville. Slate has been quarried on the creek and limestone has also been produced there. In the early 1900s, there were woolen mills and tanneries in the watershed and agriculture was also practiced. The creek also powered several small gristmills. The Susquehanna, Bloomsburg, and Berwick Railroad historically crossed the watershed and followed the creek between its mouth and Millville.

== Biology ==
The drainage basin of Little Fishing Creek is designated as Exceptional Value waters and a Migratory Fishery upstream of the tributary Lick Run in the community of Sereno. The creek's watershed downstream of Lick Run is designated as a Coldwater Fishery and a Migratory Fishery, as is the watershed of Lick Run itself. The creek is considered by the Pennsylvania Fish and Boat Commission to be Class A Wild Trout Waters from its headwaters to Talmar Road: a distance of 4.3 miles (6.9 km). A part of the tributary Lick Run is also considered to be Class A Wild Trout Waters. Ruffed grouse occur in large numbers on Little Fishing Creek north of Iola. They also occur on Spruce Run, a tributary of the creek. Little Fishing Creek has a significant riparian buffer throughout most of Jackson Township.

== Recreation ==
It is possible to canoe on 11.4 miles (18.3 km) of Little Fishing Creek during snowmelt or within two days of heavy rain. The difficulty rating of the creek is 1. Edward Gertler describes the scenery along the creek as "good to poor". However, Gertler also describes the creek as "a disappointing little feeder to Fishing Creek" states that it "does not do justice to the beautiful countryside through which it flows".

== See also ==
- Green Creek (Fishing Creek)
- Hemlock Creek
- List of rivers of Pennsylvania
