= Greenwood Township, Columbia County, Pennsylvania =

Township in Pennsylvania, US

Coordinates: 41°08′00″N 76°30′59″W

- Township
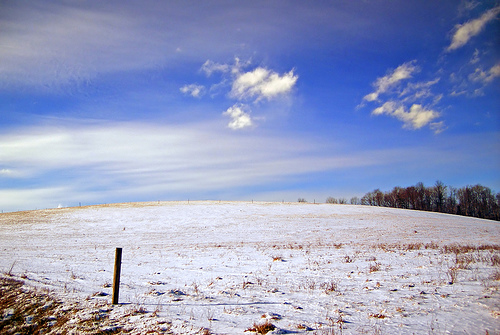
- A snowy field in Greenwood Township

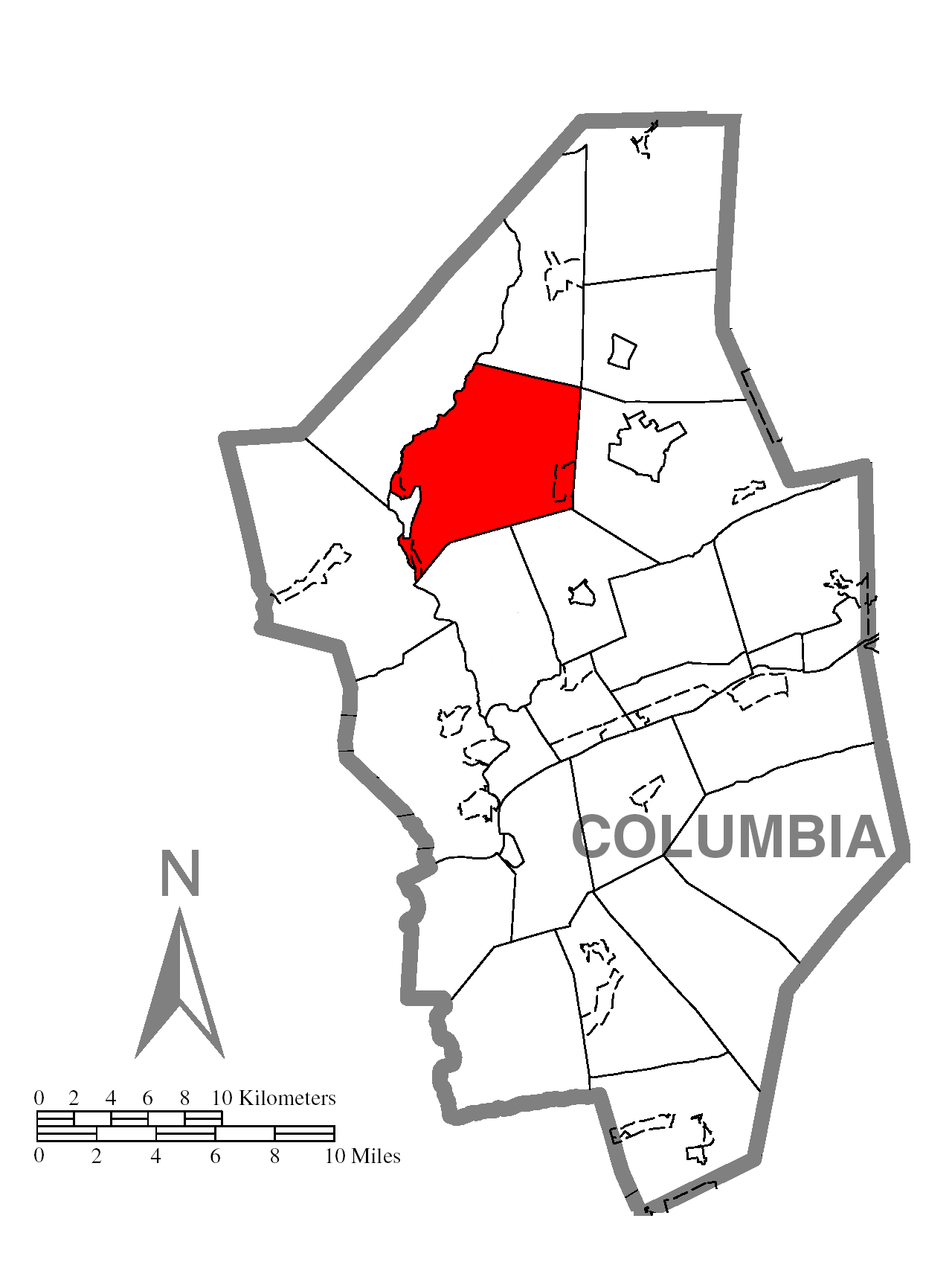
- Map of Columbia County highlighting Greenwood Township

- Map of Columbia County, Pennsylvania
- Country: United States
- State: Pennsylvania
- County: Columbia
- Settled: 1770
- Incorporated (borough): 1799

Area
  - Total: 28.44 sq mi (73.66 km^{2})
  - Land: 28.34 sq mi (73.39 km^{2})
  - Water: 0.10 sq mi (0.27 km^{2})

Population (2020)
  - Total: 1,888 ▼
  - Estimate (2021): 1,895
  - Density: 67.3/sq mi (25.97/km^{2})
- Time zone: UTC-5 (Eastern (EST))
  - Summer (DST): UTC-4 (EDT)
- Area code: 570
- FIPS code: 42-037-31392
- Website: https://greenwoodtwpcolumbiacopa.gov/

Greenwood Township is a township in Columbia County, Pennsylvania. It is part of Northeastern Pennsylvania. The population was 1,888 at the 2020 census.

== History ==
The Sam Eckman Covered Bridge No. 92 and Kramer Covered Bridge No. 113 were listed on the National Register of Historic Places in 1979.

== Geography ==
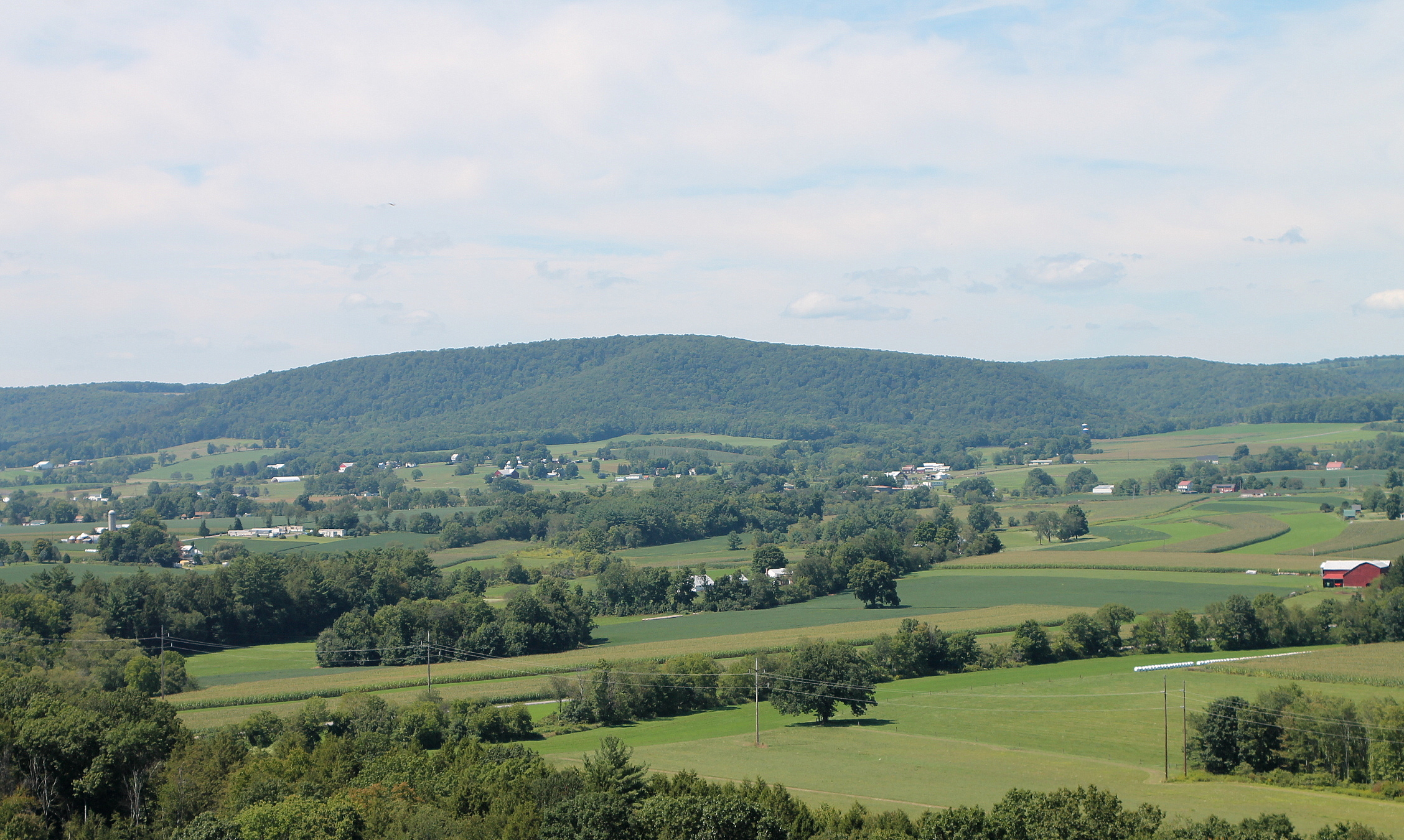
Greenwood Valley looking northwest from Turkey Path Road in southern Greenwood Township

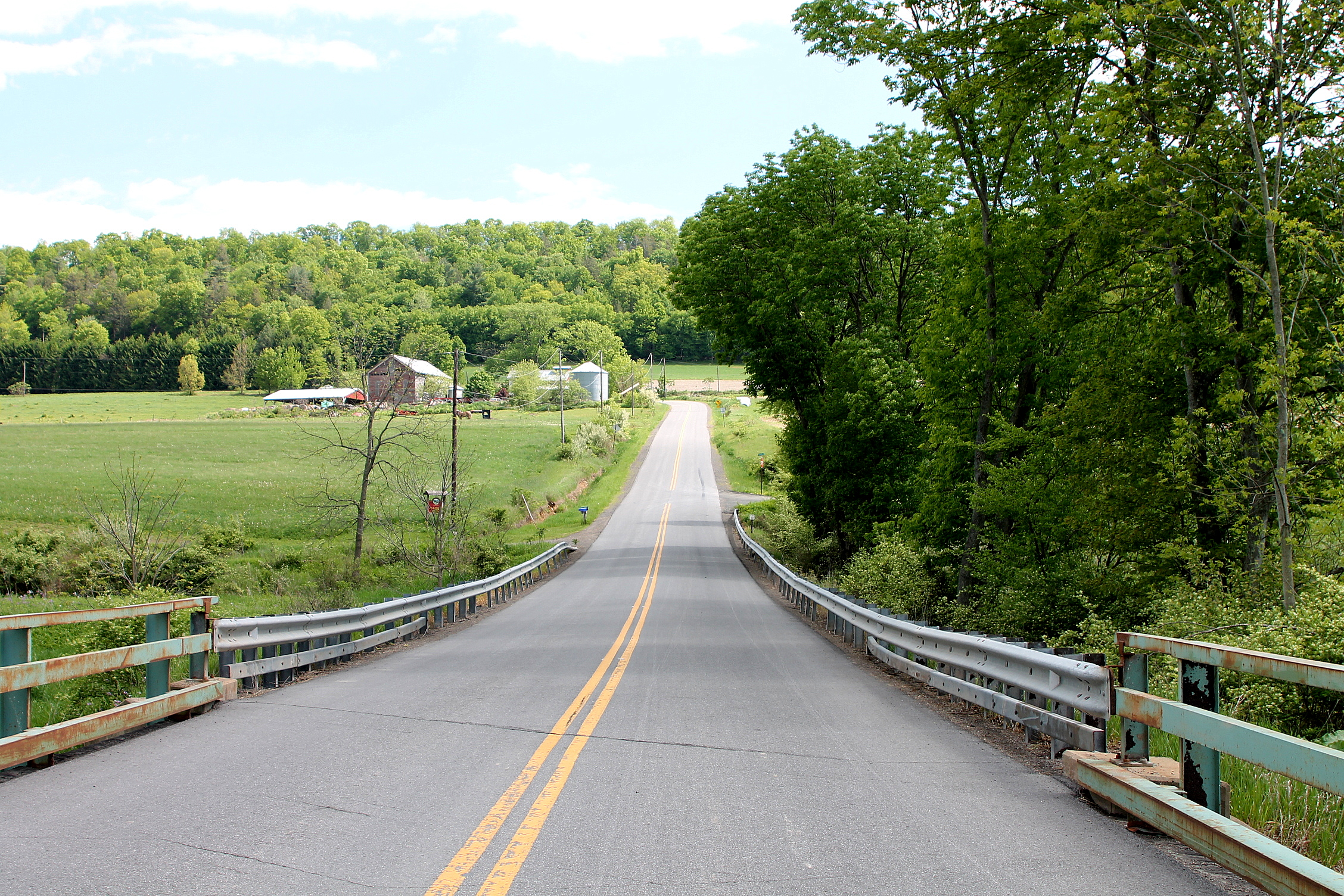
Bowmans Mill Road in southern Greenwood Township

Greenwood Township is in northern Columbia County. Little Fishing Creek forms most of the western boundary. The borough of Millville is also along the western border. The Greenwood Valley fills the southern half of the township, while hills rise in the northern half and along the southern border. Unincorporated communities in the township include Iola, Greenwood, Eyers Grove, and Rohrsburg. According to the United States Census Bureau, the township has a total area of 28.5 square miles (73.7 km^{2}), of which28.3 square miles (73.4 km^{2}) is land and 0.1 square miles (0.3 km^{2}) of it (0.37%) is water.

== Demographics ==
Historical population
Census	Pop.	Note	%±
2010	1,952		—
2020	1,888		−3.3%
2021 (est.)	1,895		0.4%
U.S. Decennial Census

As of the census of 2000, there were 1,932 people, 721 households, and 553 families residing in the township. The population density was 69.3 inhabitants per square mile (26.8/km^{2}). There were 783 housing units at an average density of 28.1 units per square mile (10.8 units/km^{2}). The racial makeup of the township was 98.55% White, 0.16% African American, 0.21% Native American, 0.21% Asian, 0.16% from other races, and 0.72% from two or more races. Hispanic or Latino of any race were 0.36% of the population.

There were 721 households, out of which 32.6% had children under the age of 18 living with them, 66.6% were married couples living together, 6.4% had a female householder with no husband present, and 23.3% were non-families. 18.7% of all households were made up of individuals, and 8.5% had someone living alone who was 65 years of age or older. The average household size was 2.68 and the average family size was 3.06.

In the township the population was spread out, with 24.7% under the age of 18, 8.3% from 18 to 24, 29.7% from 25 to 44, 25.3% from 45 to 64, and 12.1% who were 65 years of age or older. The median age was 38 years. For every 100 females, there were 102.7 males. For every 100 females age 18 and over, there were 102.1 males.

The median income for a household in the township was $37,650, and the median income for a family was $41,473. Males had a median income of $28,884 versus $21,417 for females. The per capita income for the township was $17,104. About 3.7% of families and 6.0% of the population were below the poverty line, including 6.6% of those under age 18 and 10.7% of those age 65 or over.
