= Millville, Pennsylvania =

Borough in Pennsylvania, US

- Borough
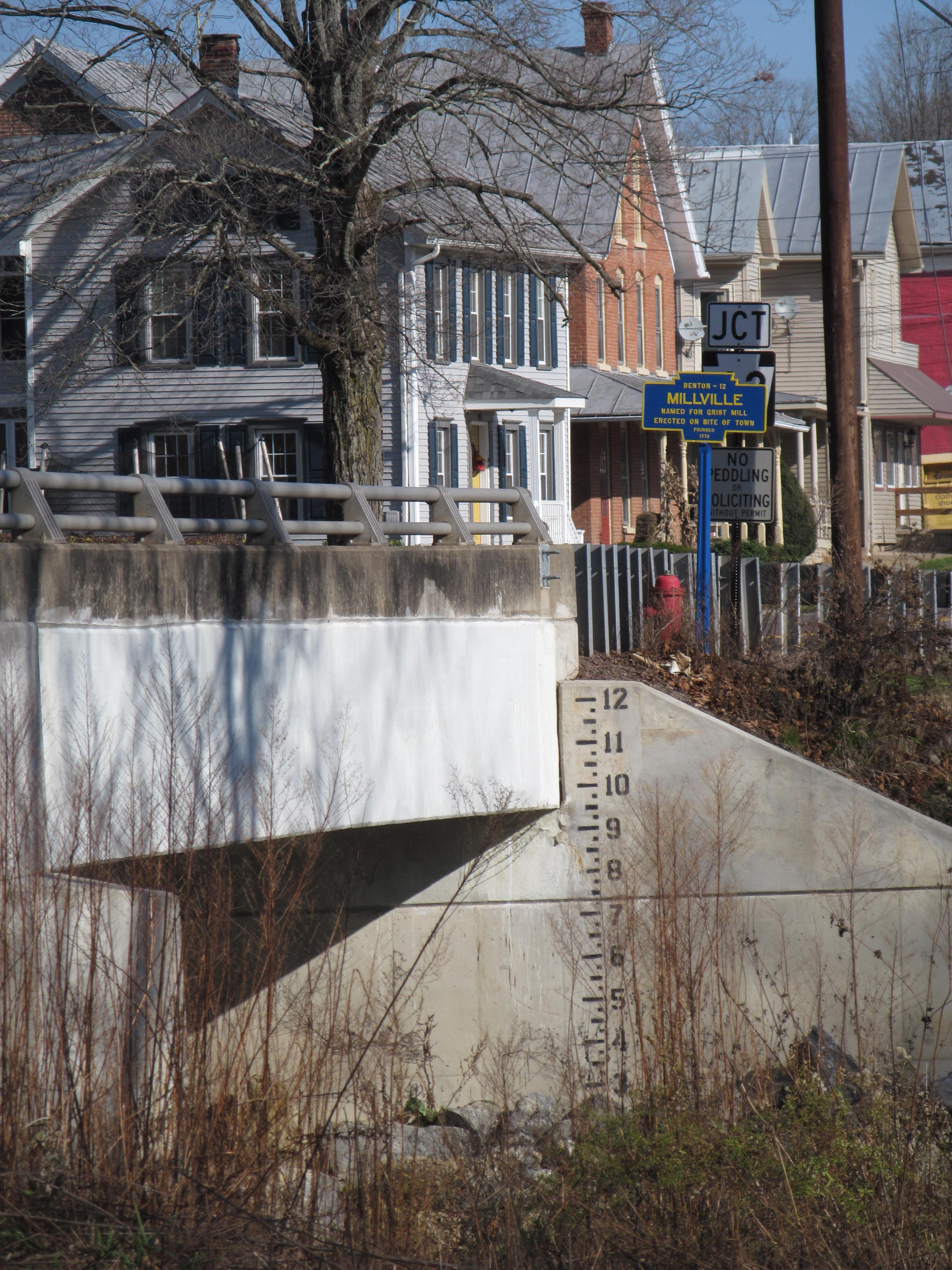

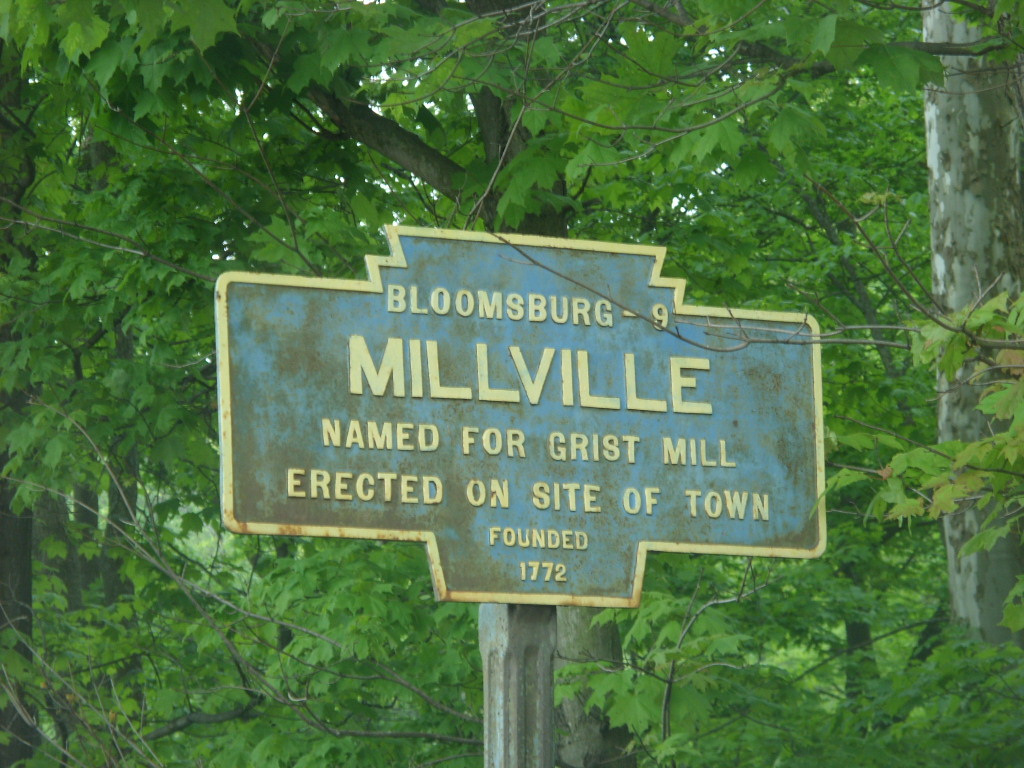
- Keystone Marker

- Location of Millville in Columbia County, Pennsylvania.

- Map showing Columbia County in Pennsylvania

- Location in Pennsylvania Millville (the United States)
- Coordinates: 41°07′22″N 76°31′40″W
- Country: United States
- State: Pennsylvania
- County: Columbia
- Settled: 1770
- Incorporated: 1892

Government
  - Type: Borough Council

Area
  - Total: 0.99 sq mi (2.56 km^{2})
  - Land: 0.98 sq mi (2.54 km^{2})
  - Water: 0.0077 sq mi (0.02 km^{2})
- Elevation: 650 ft (200 m)

Population (2020)
  - Total: 976
  - Density: 990/sq mi (384/km^{2})
- Time zone: UTC-5 (Eastern (EST))
  - Summer (DST): UTC-4 (EDT)
- ZIP Code: 17846
- Area codes: 570 and 272
- FIPS code: 42-49944
- Website: www.millvilleboro.org

Millville is a borough in Columbia County, Pennsylvania, United States. It is part of Northeastern Pennsylvania. As of the 2023 census it had a population of 984. It is part of the Bloomsburg-Berwick micropolitan area.

== History ==
John Eves, a native of Ireland living in Mill Creek Hundred, Delaware, is thought to have been one of the men to visit the Greenwood Valley and Little Fishing Creek area in 1770. (One account of this visit indicates that he purchased a sizable portion of the land he explored in the area from the Indians who had served as his guides on his journey.) Although he returned to Delaware after this initial visit, he returned the following year with his son Thomas and built a log cabin on the property. The entire Eves family arrived the next year, in 1772, and began tilling the fields adjacent to the cabin as soon as they could be cleared.

In 1774, the Eves family received a deed for their 1,203-acre (4.87 km^{2}) property in the valley, the largest land holding at the time in what would later become Columbia County. Title for the land, originally obtained by William and Elizabeth McMean in 1769, was passed to Reuben Haines, and then to John Eves.

An Indian uprising, the Battle of Wyoming, in mid-summer of 1778, caused the Eves family to flee their home in the valley and take refuge at a stockade near Washingtonville. Upon their return in 1785, they found their cabin burned and their fields overgrown, but immediately set about to recreate their homestead.

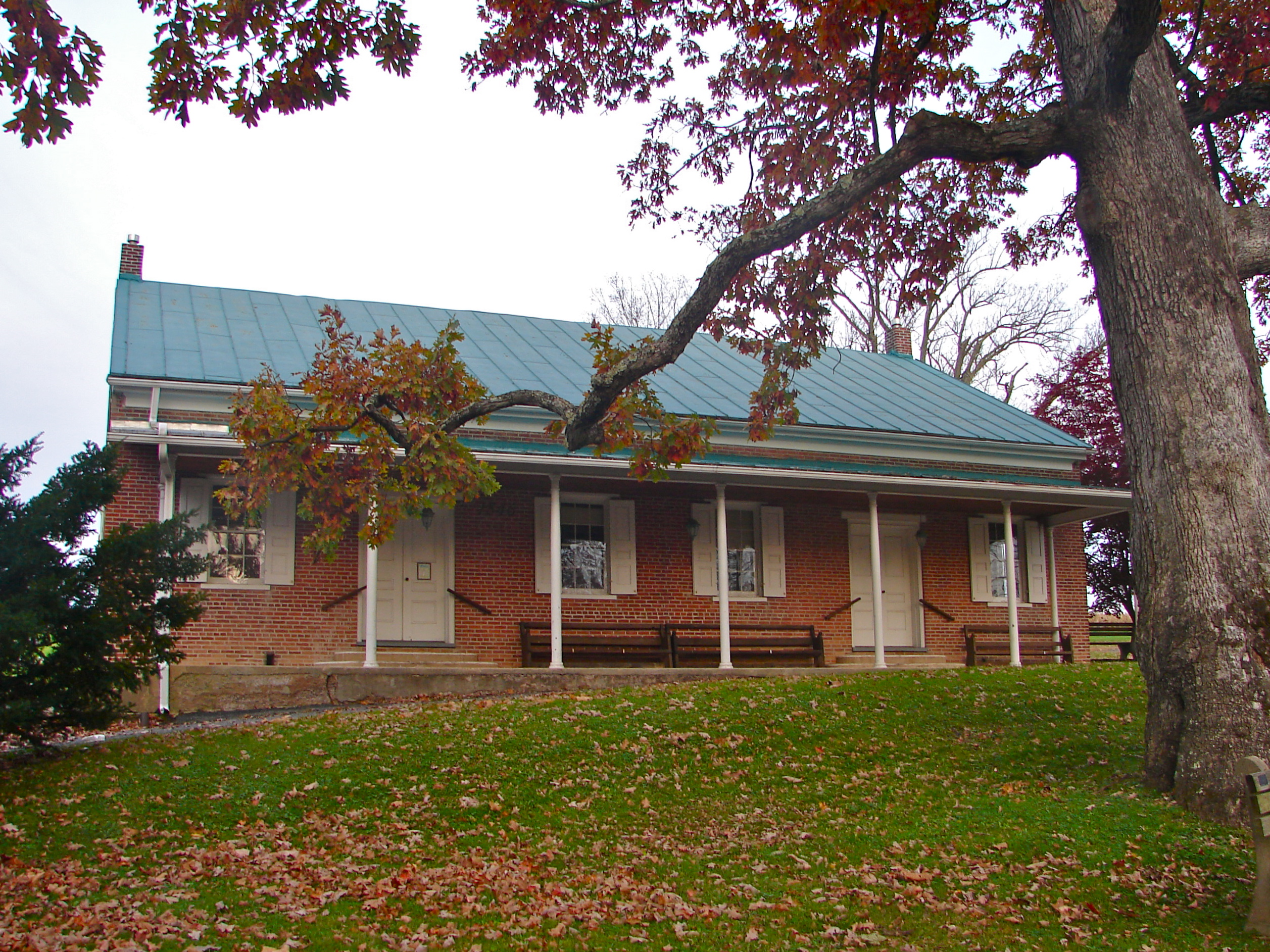
Millville Friends Meeting House, established in 1795

When the Eves family returned in the mid-1780s, they were determined to make the settlement permanent. They were accompanied or were soon followed by several other families, including Masters, Kisner, Battin, Parker, Lundy, Lemon, Oliver, and Rich. With 17 children and 104 grandchildren, John Eves looked after the building of homes for the family, a gristmill that was to stand for 100 years, and later a sawmill and several other essential structures.

Growth of the community was slow because it was not located along a main traveled route or major waterway. Until 1798, Indian trails, which crossed at Millville, were the only accessways to the area. In that year, a road was surveyed across the Mount Pleasant hills to the Susquehanna River. It was 1856 through before the road from Bloomsburg to Laporte was laid out through Millville.

Early residents were almost entirely self-sufficient. Thomas Eves succeeded his father in ownership of the grist mill and built the first house in what is now Millville Borough. According to an early historian, David and Andrew Eves opened the first store in the area in 1827. David Eves was also commissioned the first postmaster in 1831, followed by his brother Andrew some years later.

While the early population was scattered, provision was made for both worship and education. In the early years of the community, services and classes were held in the homes, but in 1785, a school was started in Millville and a two-room meeting house was erected in 1795.

Local industry at the time consisted of those operations which were necessary to meet the needs of the early population. Sawmills and grist mills were the first, followed by a woolen mill, started in 1813 by John Watson, several brick plants, and a wagon shop, established by Charles Eves, in 1837.

One spurt of growth in Millville occurred in 1856 when the road from Bloomsburg to Laporte was constructed. The town experienced considerable growth in the years following construction of this roadway because the community now had adequate access to markets and other transportation links in Bloomsburg. A second period of growth was experienced in 1887 when the railroad was constructed through town. Numerous businesses and industries were created and buildings were erected to service the railroad. A local newspaper, the Weekly Tablet, published its first edition in April 1887.

== Geography ==
Millville is located in northwestern Columbia County at 41°7′22″N 76°31′40″W (41.122785, -76.527650), on the east side of Little Fishing Creek, which flows south to join Fishing Creek just north of the Susquehanna River in Bloomsburg. According to the United States Census Bureau, the borough has a total area of 1.0 square mile (2.6 km^{2}), of which 0.008 square miles (0.02 km^{2}), or 0.85%, is water. Millville is bordered to the north, east, and south by Greenwood Township, to the southwest, across Little Fishing Creek, by Madison Township, and to the northwest, also across the creek, by Pine Township. The unincorporated community of Iola borders Millville to the north in Greenwood Township.

Millville is served by Pennsylvania Route 42 and Pennsylvania Route 254. PA 42 leads north 27 miles (43 km) (via US 220) to Laporte and south 10 miles (16 km) to Bloomsburg, the Columbia County seat, while PA 254 leads east 6 miles (10 km) to Rohrsburg and southwest 4 miles (6 km) to Jerseytown.

== Demographics ==
Historical population
Census	Pop.	Note	%±
1880	375		—
1900	593		—
1910	611		3.0%
1920	658		7.7%
1930	666		1.2%
1940	761		14.3%
1950	878		15.4%
1960	952		8.4%
1970	896		−5.9%
1980	975		8.8%
1990	969		−0.6%
2000	991		2.3%
2010	948		−4.3%
2020	976		3.0%
2021 (est.)	979	▲	0.3%

Census data shows that as of 2021, there were 976 people, 360 households, and 398 housing units in Millville. 54% of the population was female and 46% male. The racial makeup of the borough was 88% White, 1% African American, 5% Asian, 0% from other races, and 4% from two or more races. Hispanic or Latino of any race were 2% of the population. 6.7% of the population was foreign born, with 72% coming from Asia, 22% from Europe, and 6% from Africa. 41% of the population was married and 59% single.

Of the 360 households, 62% were married couples living together, 13% had a female householder, 2% male householder, and 24% were non-families. The average household size was 2.4. Of the 398 housing units, 90% were occupied and 51% owner-occupied. 63% of the housing units were single unit and 37% multi-unit. The median value of owner-occupied housing units was $145,400 - about 75% of the state median.

The median age of borough residents was 41.9, about 1% higher than the state median. 15% of residents were under the age of 18, 65% from 18 to 64, and 20% were 65 years of age or older.

The median household income in the borough was $52,692 while per capita income was $25,061, both below the state medians. 15.6% of the population were below the poverty line, including 6% of those under age 18 and 14% of those age 65 or over. 91.6% had a high school degree or better, and 22.7% had a bachelor's degree or better.

== Education ==
The school district is Millville Area School District.
