= Pine Township, Columbia County, Pennsylvania =

Township in Pennsylvania, US

Coordinates: 41°15′01″N 76°27′29″W

- Township
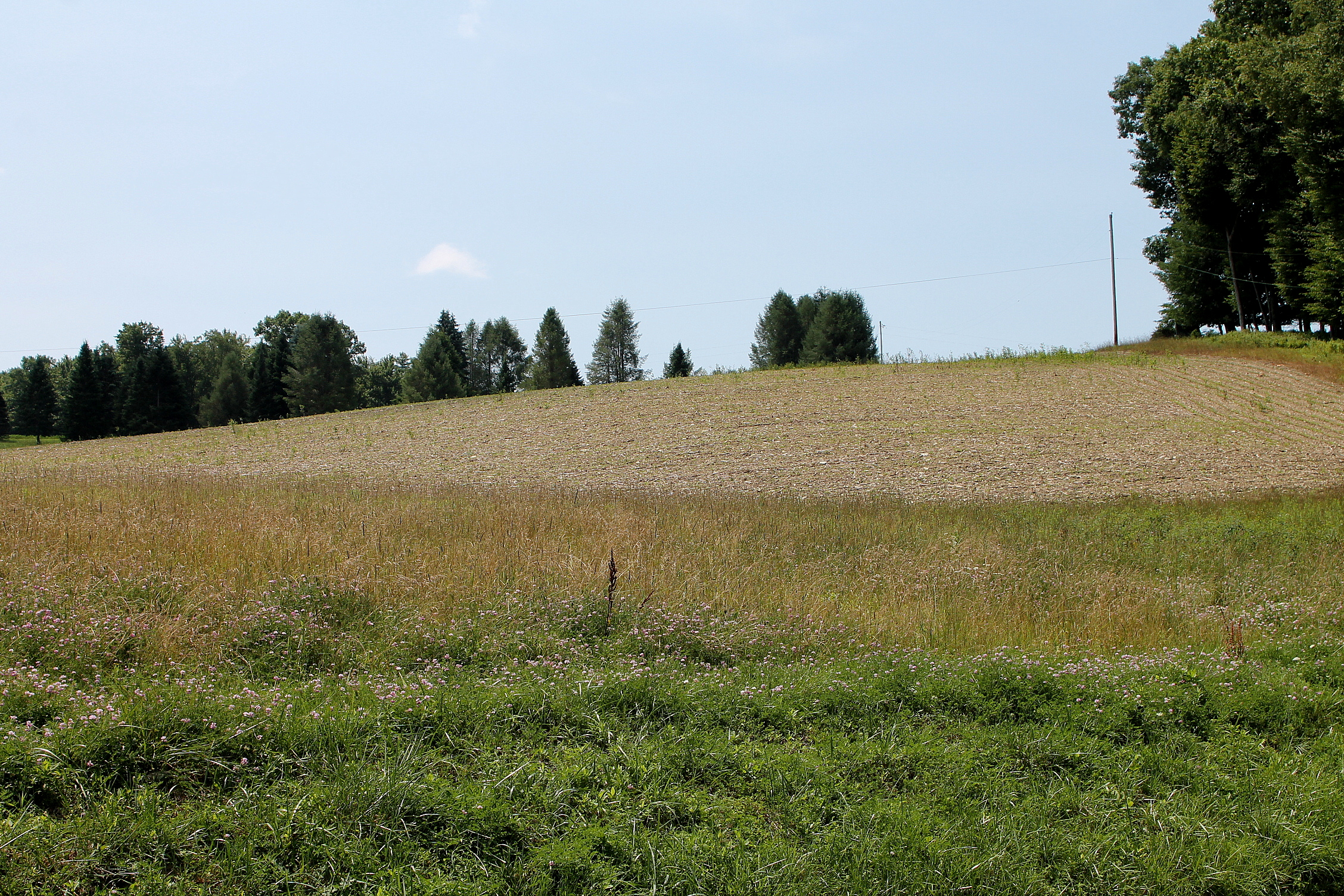
- Scenery of Pine Township, Columbia County, Pennsylvania

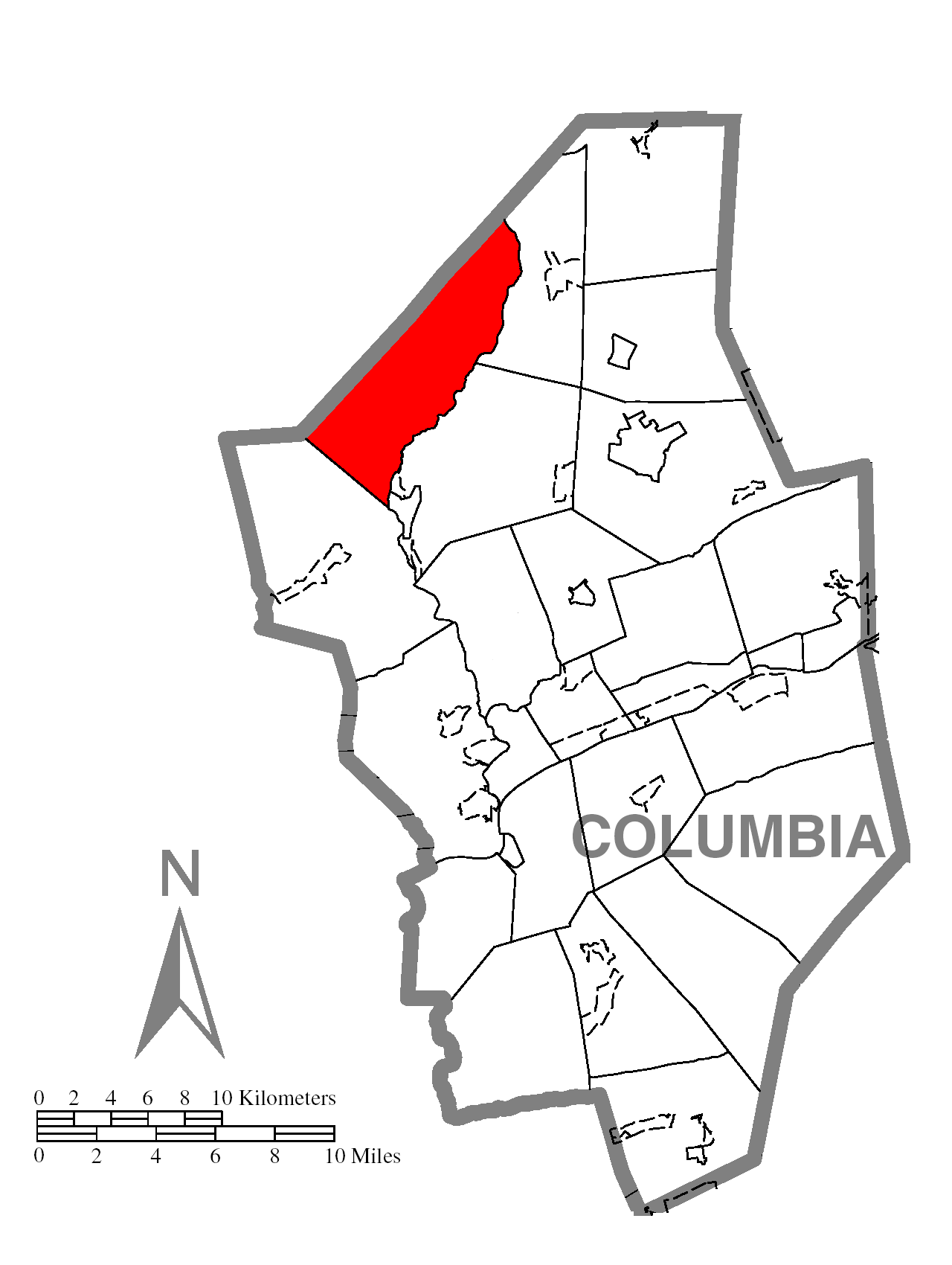
- Map of Columbia County, Pennsylvania highlighting Pine Township

- Map of Columbia County, Pennsylvania
- Country: United States
- State: Pennsylvania
- County: Columbia
- Settled: 1796
- Incorporated: 1853

Area
  - Total: 26.49 sq mi (68.60 km^{2})
  - Land: 26.43 sq mi (68.46 km^{2})
  - Water: 0.054 sq mi (0.14 km^{2})

Population (2020)
  - Total: 1,014 ▼
  - Estimate (2021): 834; 1,012
  - Density: 38.8/sq mi (14.99/km^{2})
- Time zone: UTC-5 (Eastern (EST))
  - Summer (DST): UTC-4 (EDT)
- Area code: 570
- FIPS code: 42-037-60304

Pine Township is a township in Columbia County, Pennsylvania. It is part of Northeastern Pennsylvania. The population was 1,014 at the time of the 2020 census.

== History ==
Pine Township remained without settlers for a longer time than the neighboring townships. However, by the early 1800s, there was a tannery and a sawmill in the township.

=== Covered bridges ===
The Sam Eckman Covered Bridge No. 92, Jud Christie Covered Bridge No. 95, Creasyville Covered Bridge, and Shoemaker Covered Bridge were listed on the National Register of Historic Places in 1979.

== Geography ==
Pine Township is located along the northwestern boundary of Columbia County adjacent to Lycoming County. The southeast border of the township follows Little Fishing Creek, which flows south towards the Susquehanna River.

The unincorporated community of Pine Summit is located in the southwestern part of the township, along Pennsylvania Route 442.

According to the United States Census Bureau, the township has a total area of 26.5 square miles (68.6 km^{2}), of which 26.4 square miles (68.5 km^{2}) is land and 0.04 square miles (0.1 km^{2}), or 0.20%, is water.

== Demographics ==
Historical population
Census	Pop.	Note	%±
2010	1,046		—
2020	1,014		−3.1%
2021 (est.)	1,012		−0.2%

As of the census of 2000, there were 1,092 people, 404 households, and 324 families residing in the township.

The population density was 41.1 inhabitants per square mile (15.9/km^{2}). There were 483 housing units at an average density of 18.2/sq mi (7.0/km^{2}).

The racial makeup of the township was 99.36% White, 0.09% Native American, 0.09% Asian, 0.09% from other races, and 0.37% from two or more races. Hispanic or Latino of any race were 0.18% of the population.

There were 404 households, out of which 33.9% had children under the age of eighteen living with them; 68.6% were married couples living together, 6.4% had a female householder with no husband present, and 19.8% were non-families. 15.6% of all households were made up of individuals, and 5.2% had someone living alone who was sixty-five years of age or older.

The average household size was 2.70 and the average family size was 2.99.

In the township the population was spread out, with 25.1% under the age of eighteen, 6.2% from eighteen to twenty-four, 30.9% from twenty-five to forty-four, 25.5% from forty-five to sixty-four, and 12.4% who were sixty-five years of age or older. The median age was thirty-nine years.

For every one hundred females, there were 100.0 males. For every one hundred females who were aged eighteen or older, there were 100.0 males.

The median income for a household in the township was $38,375, and the median income for a family was $41,750. Males had a median income of $30,750 compared with that of $21,000 for females.

The per capita income for the township was $16,621.

Roughly 4.7% of families and 8.3% of the population were living below the poverty line, including 9.4% of those who were under the age of eighteen and 21.2% of those who were aged sixty-five or older.
