= Bassett House =

Bassett House may refer to:

in the United States (by state then city)

- Orland P. Bassett House, Hinsdale, Illinois, listed on the National Register of Historic Places (NRHP) in DuPage County
- Compton Bassett, Upper Marlboro, Maryland, listed on the NRHP
- Maria Bassett House, Arlington, Massachusetts, listed on the NRHP
- Edwin Bassett House, Reading, Massachusetts, listed on the NRHP
- C.J.H. Bassett House, Taunton, Massachusetts, listed on the NRHP
- Dr. Samuel A. Bassett Office and Residence, Richmond Heights, Missouri, listed on the NRHP in St. Louis County
- Bassett Lodge and Range Cafe, Bassett, Nebraska, listed on the NRHP
- Bassett Family House, Mt. Vision, New York, listed on the NRHP
- Bassett House (Durham, North Carolina), listed on the NRHP in Durham County
- Bassett and Bassett Banking House, Brenham, Texas, listed on the NRHP in Washington County
