= David Alan Black =

American scholar and academic (born 1952)

- Born: June 9, 1952 (age 74); Honolulu, Hawaii
- Title: Professor of New Testament and Greek

Academic background
- Education: Biola University, Talbot School of Theology, Jerusalem University College, Israel
- Alma mater: University of Basel, Switzerland
- Thesis: The Pauline Weakness Motif (1983)
- Doctoral advisor: Bo Reicke

David Alan Black (born 9 June 1952, Honolulu, Hawaii) is Professor of New Testament and Greek and the Dr. M. O. Owens Jr. Chair of New Testament Studies at the Southeastern Baptist Theological Seminary. He specialises in New Testament Greek grammar (Koine Greek), the application of linguistics to the study of the Greek New Testament, and New Testament textual criticism.

== Biography ==
Black was born in Honolulu, Hawaii. In 1975, Black finished his studies at the Biola University. In 1983 he received a D.Theol. at the University of Basel. He taught at the Southeastern Baptist Theological Seminary since 1998, and taught Greek to seminary students and church leaders in several different countries.

David Alan Black argues that Greek is an essential language to learn to understand the Bible (thus his 1993 book Learn to Read New Testament Greek), and seeks to connect his students with the holiness of the Greek grammar.

In April 2012, he became the first recipient of the Dr. M.O. Owens Jr. Chair of New Testament Studies endowed by the Southeastern Baptist Theological Seminary.

== Works ==
n.b. Black has written extensively - particularly on the subject of the biblical languages.

=== Books ===
- Black, David Alan (1984). Paul, Apostle of Weakness: Astheneia and its Cognates in the Pauline Literature. American University Studies, Series VII, Theology and religion. Vol. 3. New York: Lang. ISBN 9780820401065. OCLC 10532252.
- ——— (1988). Linguistics for Students of New Testament Greek: A Survey of Basic Concepts and Applications. Grand Rapids, MI: Baker Book House. ISBN 9780801009495. OCLC 17388265.
- ——— (1993). Using New Testament Greek in Ministry: A Practical Guide for Students and Pastors. Grand Rapids, MI: Baker Book House. ISBN 9780801010439. OCLC 27143979.
- ——— (1993). Learn to Read New Testament Greek. Nashville, TN: Broadman Press. ISBN 9780805415452. OCLC 26397439.
- ——— (1994). Learn to Read New Testament Greek: Expanded Edition (2nd ed.). Nashville, TN: Broadman & Holman. ISBN 9780805416121. OCLC 30544768.
- ——— (1994). New Testament Textual Criticism: A Concise Guide. Grand Rapids, MI: Baker Book House. ISBN 9780801010743. OCLC 29637978.
- ——— (1995). Linguistics for Students of New Testament Greek: essays on discourse analysis. Grand Rapids, MI: Baker Book House. ISBN 9780805415094. OCLC 26262110.
- ——— (1998). It's Still Greek to Me: An Easy-to-Understand Guide to Intermediate Greek. Grand Rapids, MI: Baker Book House. ISBN 9780801021817. OCLC 39085320.
- ——— (1999). The Myth of Adolescence: Raising Responsible Children in an Irresponsible Society. Yorba Linda, CA: Davidson Press. ISBN 9781891833519. OCLC 41353736.
- ——— (2001). Why Four Gospels?. Grand Rapids, MI: Kregel. ISBN 9780825420702. OCLC 48955857.
- ———; Lea, Thomas D. (2003). The New Testament: Its Background and Message. Nashville, TN: Broadman & Holman. ISBN 9780805426328. OCLC 54207001.
- ——— (2004). Why I Stopped Listening to Rush: Confessions of a Recovering Neocon. Baltimore, MD: Publish America. ISBN 9781413730197. OCLC 61249183.
- ——— (2009). Learn to Read New Testament Greek (3rd ed.). Nashville, TN: Broadman & Holman. ISBN 9780805444933. OCLC 233935327.
- ——— (2009). The Jesus Paradigm. Gonzalez, FL: Energion Publications. ISBN 9781893729568. OCLC 457935462.
- ——— (2010). Why Four Gospels?: The Historical Origins of the Gospels (2nd revised ed.). Gonzalez, FL: Energerion Press. ISBN 9781893729872. OCLC 702346794.
- ——— (2012). Will You Join the Cause of Global Missions?. Gonzalez, FL: Energerion Press. ISBN 9781893729186. OCLC 940451521.
- ——— (2012). Paul, Apostle of Weakness: Astheneia and its Cognates in the Pauline Literature (2nd revised ed.). Eugene, OR: Pickwick Publications. ISBN 9781610976039. OCLC 813930456.
- ——— (2013). The Authorship of Hebrews: The Case for Paul. Topical line drives. Vol. 1. Gonzalez, FL: Energerion Press. ISBN 9781938434730. OCLC 859384096.
- ——— (2014). It's All Greek to Me: Confessions of an Unlikely Academic. Gonzalez, FL: Energerion Press. ISBN 9781631990397. OCLC 889218379.
- ——— (2014). Seven Marks of a New Testament Church: A Guide for Christians of All Ages. Gonzalez, FL: Energerion Press. ISBN 9781631990465. OCLC 889218445.
- ——— (2016). Running My Race: Reflections on Life, Loss, Aging, and 40 Years of Teaching. Gonzalez, FL: Energerion Press. ISBN 9781631992940. OCLC 975272820.

=== Edited by ===
- ———; Dockery, David S., eds. (1991). New Testament Criticism and Interpretation: essays on methods and issues. Grand Rapids, MI: Zondervan. ISBN 9780310519119. OCLC 796956018.
- ———, ed. (1992). Linguistics and New Testament Interpretation: Essays on Discourse Analysis. Nashville, TN: Broadman & Holman. ISBN 9780805415094. OCLC 925117114.
- ———, ed. (1992). Scribes and Scripture: New Testament Essays in Honor of J. Harold Greenlee. Winona Lake, IN: Eisenbrauns. ISBN 9780931464706. OCLC 25163998.
- ———, ed. (1999). The Holy Bible: International Standard Version New Testament - (New Testament editor). Yorba Linda, CA: Davidson Press.
- ———; Prescott, Stephen; Moseley, Neal Alan, eds. (2000). Here I Stand: Essays in Honor of Paige Patterson. Yorba Linda, CA: Davidson Press. ISBN 9781891833588. OCLC 44877664.
- ———; Dockery, David S., eds. (2001). Interpreting the New Testament: Essays on Methods and Issues. Nashville, TN: Broadman & Holman. ISBN 9780805418507. OCLC 469272035.
- ———; Beck, David R., eds. (2001). Rethinking the Synoptic Problem. Grand Rapids, MI: Baker Academic. ISBN 9780801022814. OCLC 46884283.
- ———, ed. (2002). Rethinking New Testament Textual Criticism. Grand Rapids, MI: Baker Academic. ISBN 9780801022807. OCLC 994773970.
- ———, ed. (2008). Perspectives on the Ending of Mark. Nashville, TN: Broadman & Holman. ISBN 9780805447620. OCLC 717936145.
- ———; Bevere, Allan R., eds. (2009–2014). Areopagus: Critical Christian Issues Series - (series general editors). Gonzalez, FL: Energion.
- ———; Cerone, Jacob, eds. (2016). The Pericope of the Adulteress in Contemporary Research. The Library of New Testament Studies Series. London: T&T Clark. ISBN 978-0-56766-579-9. OCLC 7390638845.

=== Journal articles ===
- ——— (Spring 1981). "The peculiarities of Ephesians and the Ephesian address". Grace Theological Journal. 2 (1): 59–73.
- ——— (Spring 1983). "Weakness language in Galatians". Grace Theological Journal. 4 (1): 15–36.
- ——— (Spring 1984). "Paulus infirmus: the Pauline concept of weakness". Grace Theological Journal. 5 (1): 77–93.
- ——— (Spring 1985). "The text of John 3:13". Grace Theological Journal. 6 (1): 49–66.
- ——— (Fall 1986). "The problem of the literary structure of Hebrews: an evaluation and a proposal". Grace Theological Journal. 7 (2): 163–177.

== Festschriften ==
- Akin, Daniel L.; Hudgins, Thomas W., eds. (2017). Getting into the Text: New Testament essays in honor of David Alan Black. Eugene, OR: Pickwick Publications. ISBN 9781498237611. OCLC 1002272976.
- Winstead, Melton B., ed. (2018). New Testament Philology: Essays in Honor of David Alan Black. Eugene, OR: Pickwick Publications. ISBN 9781532618949. OCLC 1048450434.
