= Watts Street Baptist Church =

Church in Durham, North Carolina, US

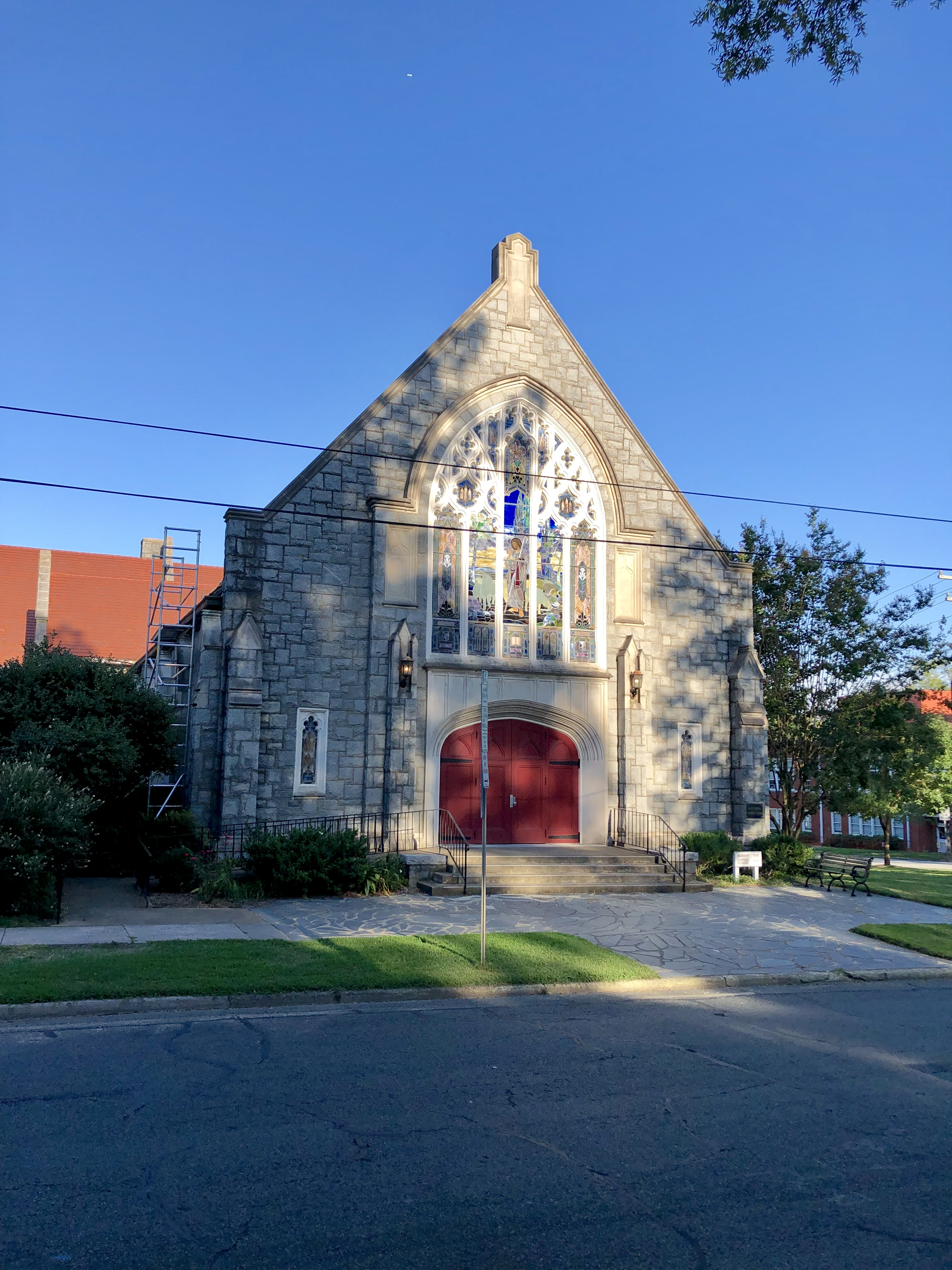
- Front entrance of Watts Street Baptist Church in 2019
- Watts Street Baptist Church
- 36°0′33″N 78°54′38″W
- Location: 800 Watts Street; Durham, North Carolina, United States
- Denomination: Alliance of Baptists; ABCUSA; Cooperative Baptist Fellowship
- Website: wattsstreet.org

Architecture
- Functional status: Active
- Architect(s): Stanhope S. Johnson; Marion Ham
- Architectural type: Gothic Revival
- Groundbreaking: 1923
- Completed: 1925

Clergy
- Pastor: Dorisanne Cooper (Senior Minister)

Watts Street Baptist Church is a progressive Baptist church in the Trinity Park neighborhood of Durham, North Carolina. The congregation is member of American Baptist Churches USA and the Association of Welcoming and Affirming Baptists. The church has been historically progressive, promoting civil rights, the ordination of women, and LGBTQ inclusivity. Addie Elizabeth Davis and Lisa Grabarek, the first and fourth women to be ordained as pastors in Southern Baptist Convention, were ordained at Watts Street Baptist Church.

== History ==
On January 14, 1923, Dr. Carl Norris, a local dentist who lived at 401 Watts Street in Trinity Park, organized a meeting at Watts Street School to discuss establishing a neighborhood church. Attendees of the meeting included Judge W.H. Young and J.M. Cheek. On March 4, 1923, a formal organizational meeting was held, where 126 people pledged themselves to the covenant of the church and elected deacons from the neighborhood's residents: J.S. Eubanks, Dr. William J.H. Cotton, F.R. Clark, Dr. E.H. Bowling, E.C. Johnson, J.T. Salmon, D.C. May, and Dr. Carl Norris. The church had 157 charter members.

Two church members purchased land on the corner of Watts Street and Urban Avenue, and the congregation charged J.T. Salmon and Connie H. Shipp to lead the construction efforts. They hired Stanhope S. Johnson, an architect from Lynchburg, Virginia, who designed the Washington Duke Hotel in downtown Durham, to design the church. Johnson used blue granite from Waynesville, North Carolina, and designed the church in the Gothic Revival style. The church building opened on April 5, 1925.

Rev. Howard Weeks was appointed as the first pastor of Watts Street Baptist Church in September 1923.

In 1950, architect Marion Ham built the educational wing of the church.

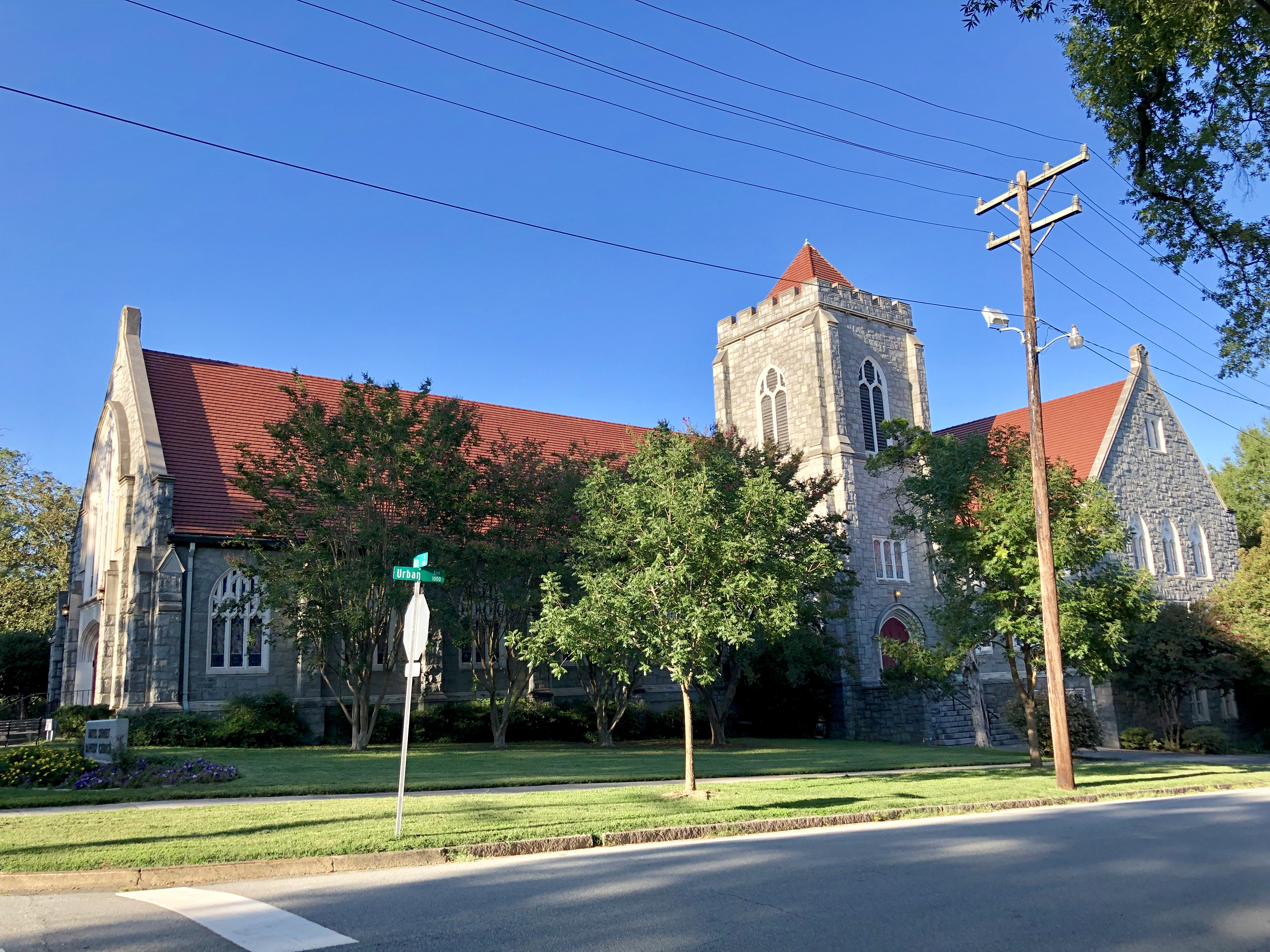
Street view of the church

In 1960, the church, under the leadership of Rev. Warren Carr, was known for social progressivism and participating in the civil rights movement. In 1963, Addie Elizabeth Davis was granted a license to preach by the church. Davis was formally ordained at Watts Baptist Church on August 9, 1964, becoming the first woman to be ordained as a pastor in the Southern Baptist Convention. Watts Street Baptist Church faced criticism for ordaining a woman. Dolores Atkins became the first woman member of the church's diaconate in 1966, followed by Beth Upchurch. In 1974, Lisa Grabarek, the daughter of former Durham mayor Wense Grabarek, was ordained at Watts Street Baptist Church, becoming the fourth woman to be ordained in the Southern Baptist Convention.

The church became a member of American Baptist Churches USA in 1967. It became affiliated with the Alliance of Baptists in 1989 and affiliated with the Cooperative Baptist Fellowship in 1991. In 1988, the church severed ties with the Southern Baptist Convention and, in 2004, voted to leave the Baptist State Convention. In 2009, the church voted to join the Association of Welcoming and Affirming Baptists, solidifying their stance as a LGBTQ-affirming church.

== Bibliography ==
- Durso, Pamela Robinson (January 1, 2018). "Remembering Addie: Baptist Ordination Pioneer and the Influence of Feminism on Her Ministry Journey". Baptist History and Heritage. 53 (2): 31–42.
