= Trinity Avenue Presbyterian Church =

Presbyterian church in Durham, NC

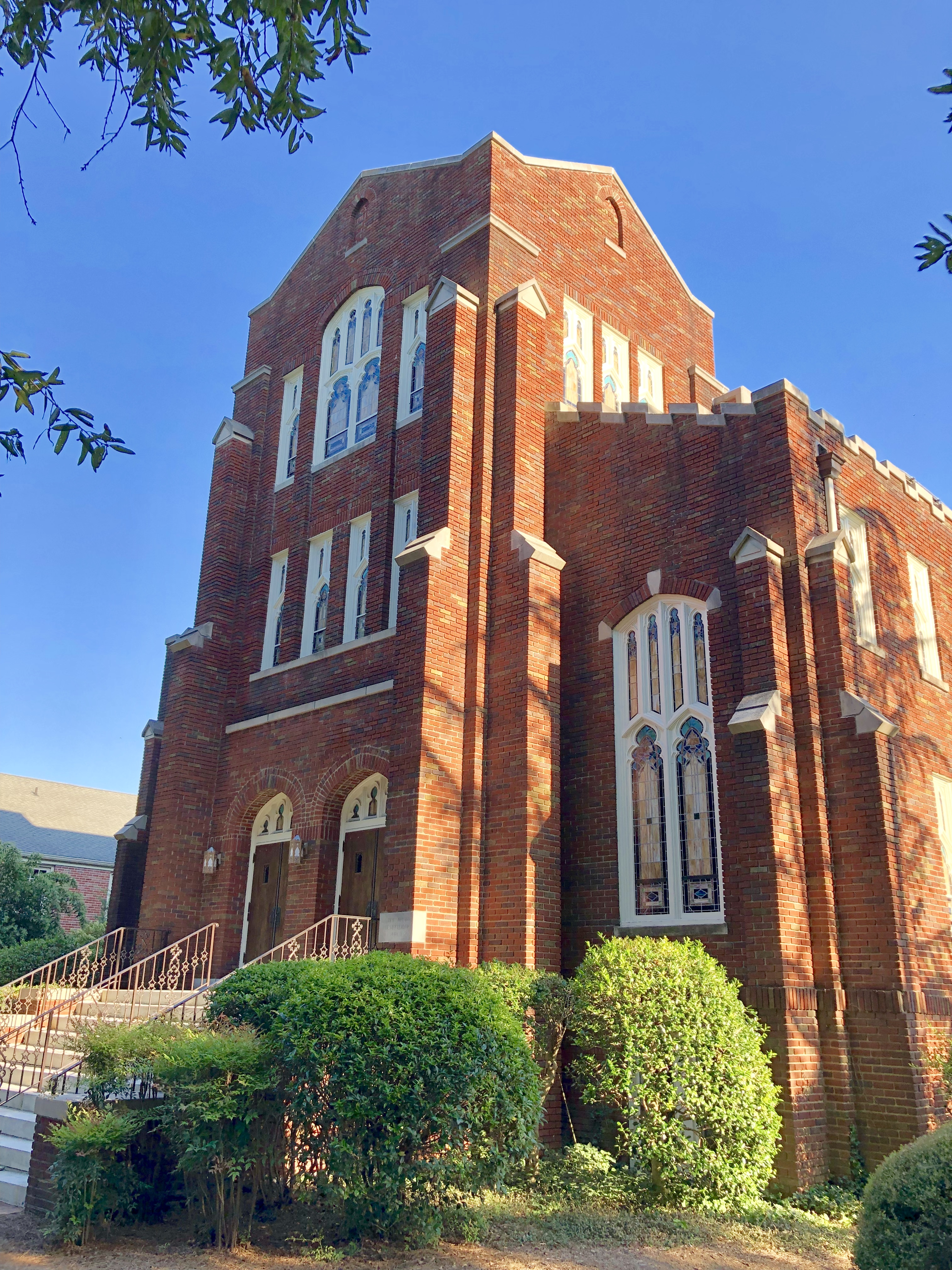
- Trinity Avenue Presbyterian Church in 2019

Religion
- Affiliation: PCUSA
- Status: Active

Location
- Location: 927 W Trinity Avenue; Durham, North Carolina, United States
- Interactive map of Trinity Avenue Presbyterian Church
- Coordinates: 36°0′19″N 78°54′28″W

Architecture
- Architects: Rose and Rose
- Groundbreaking: 1924
- Completed: 1925

Website
- trinityave.org

Trinity Avenue Presbyterian Church is a Presbyterian church in the Trinity Park neighborhood of Durham, North Carolina. The congregation was established in the late 19th century for workers at the Pearl Cotton Mill. The current church building was completed in 1925.

== History ==
Trinity Avenue Presbyterian Church started as a mission of First Presbyterian Church, led by Rev. L.B. Turnball, to serve the workers at Pearl Cotton Mill. George Washington Watts, president of the mill, led Sunday school classes and Friday evening prayer meetings. The congregation met in a cottage on Washington Street and later, before 1898, they built a frame church on the southeast corner of North Duke Street and West Trinity Avenue. The church was referred to as Pearl Mill Chapel from 1902 to 1903 and then as Second Presbyterian Church.

On May 16, 1921, seventy people attended a revival service and reorganized congregation as Trinity Avenue Presbyterian Church, appointing George L. Cooper as the first full-time minister. In 1923, fifty-four congregants of First Presbyterian transferred their membership to Trinity Avenue.

The current church building was built in 1925 by Rose and Rose architects for $77,800. The first service in the new sanctuary took place on October 18, 1925. An education wing was built to the east of the sanctuary in the early 1950s, but suffered significant fire damage on January 15, 1966. It was repaired and, in 2004, a second education wing was constructed.

In 2019, Trinity Avenue hosted the congregation of Beth El Synagogue for fifteen months while the synagogue underwent renovations.
