= Elizabeth Mburu =

Kenyan theologian (born 1968)

Elizabeth Mbūrū
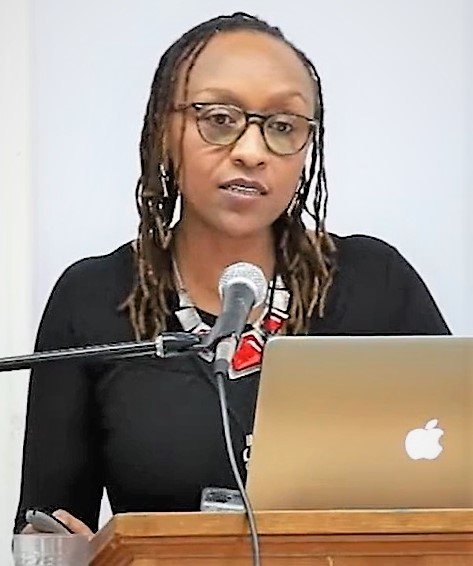
- Mbūrū at the 2019 Africa Baptist Theological Education Network conference]
- Born: 1968 (age 57–58); Kenya
- Occupation: Professor

Elizabeth W. Mbūrū (born 1968) is a Kenyan theologian who is a professor of New Testament and Greek at the International Leadership University, Africa International University and Pan Africa Christian University in Nairobi. She as the first woman to gain a PhD from Southeastern Baptist Theological Seminary, North Carolina, USA. Her book, African Hermeneutics, seeks to provide a uniquely African approach to interpreting the Bible.

== Early life and education ==
Mbūrū grew up in Nairobi in a family with six children. She is a third generation Christian, and her grandfather was involved in the translation of the Bible into Kikuyu in the early 1900s. Mbūrū became a Christian herself in 1993 and began to work with street children, leading to a desire for further training.

Mbūrū has a Master of Divinity from Nairobi International School of Theology and a Master of Sacred Theology from Northwest Baptist Seminary (now Corban University). She received her PhD in New Testament from Southeastern Baptist Theological Seminary (SEBTS) in 2008 with a thesis titled "Qumran and the Origins of Johannine Language and Symbolism", which became her first book. While there, she served as managing editor of the seminary's newsletter, Academicus.

== Career and research ==
Mbūrū taught at Montreat College in the United States before returning to Kenya where she has taught at the Africa International University. She is a curriculum evaluator for the Association of Christian Theological Education in Africa and African regional coordinator and commissioning editor for Langham Literature. She joined the Board of the Africa Bible Commentary in 2017 and was New Testament editor for its revision. She is also on the boards of a number of journals including the South African Baptist Journal of Theology, Conspectus Journal and Pan Africa Christian University Journal.

Mbūrū serves in the African Biblical Studies Consultation Steering Committee with Kidist Bahru Gemeda, Misheck Nyirenda and Abeneazer G. Urga at the Evangelical Theological Society. Papers presented at the consultation's special session in 2022 were published in Conspectus Journal Special edition (Vol. 35 No. 2) in 2023. Mbūrū and Abeneazer G. Urga guest edited the special edition.

Mbūrū book, African Hermeneutics proposes an intercultural approach that moves from theories, methods and categories familiar to the African world into the world of the Bible, without "taking a detour through any foreign methods". She has said she was motivated to write the book due to the rapid growth of the church in the global South, particularly Africa, a lack of contextual resources available to her students, and the challenges of syncretism. She said her work also "challenges and broadens the lens of Western assumptions and interpretation because it presents Western readers with a different way of looking at texts". Her analogy of a four-legged stool is summarised by Frederick Mawusi Amevenkhu and Isaac Boaheng in their book Biblical Exegesis in African Context as a "suitable model for the African context".

In 2019, Mbūrū received an Outstanding Academic Achievement Award from SEBTS and gave the keynote address at a celebration held during the 71st annual Evangelical Theological Society meeting.

== Selected publications ==
=== Books ===
- Mburu, Elizabeth W. (2010). Qumran and the Origins of Johannine Language and Symbolism. A&C Black. ISBN 9780567523716.
- Mburu, Elizabeth (2019). African Hermeneutics. Langham Publishing. ISBN 9781783685387.
- Abebe, Sofanit T.; Mburu, Elizabeth W.; Urga, Abeneazer G., eds. (2024). Reading Hebrews and 1 Peter from Majority World Perspectives. Bloomsbury Publishing, T&T Clark; The Library of New Testament Studies. ISBN 9780567715777.
- Horton, Michael S.; Mburu, Elizabeth W.; Holcomb, Justin S., eds. (2025). Prophet, Priest, and King: Christology in Global Perspective. Zondervan Academic. ISBN 9780310142928.

=== Chapters ===
- Mburu, Elizabeth (2017). "Is God a God of Retribution? A Worldview Interpretation Using the Four-Legged-Stool Hermeneutical Model". In Rodney L. Reed (ed.). Christianity and Suffering: African Perspectives. Langham Publishing. ISBN 9781783683611.
- Mburu, Elizabeth (2018). "From the Classroom to the Pulpit:Navigating the Challenges". In Rodney L. Reed (ed.). African Contextual Realities. Langham Publishing. ISBN 9781783684748.
- Mburu, Elizabeth (2019). "Integration of Faith, Life, and Academia to Achieve Transformational Education". In David K. Ngaruiya; Rodney L. Reed (eds.). Governance and Christian Higher Education in the African Context. Langham Publishing. ISBN 9781783685608.

== Personal life ==
Mburu is married to Caxton and they have three children.
