= Shoemaker Covered Bridge =

- U.S. National Register of Historic Places
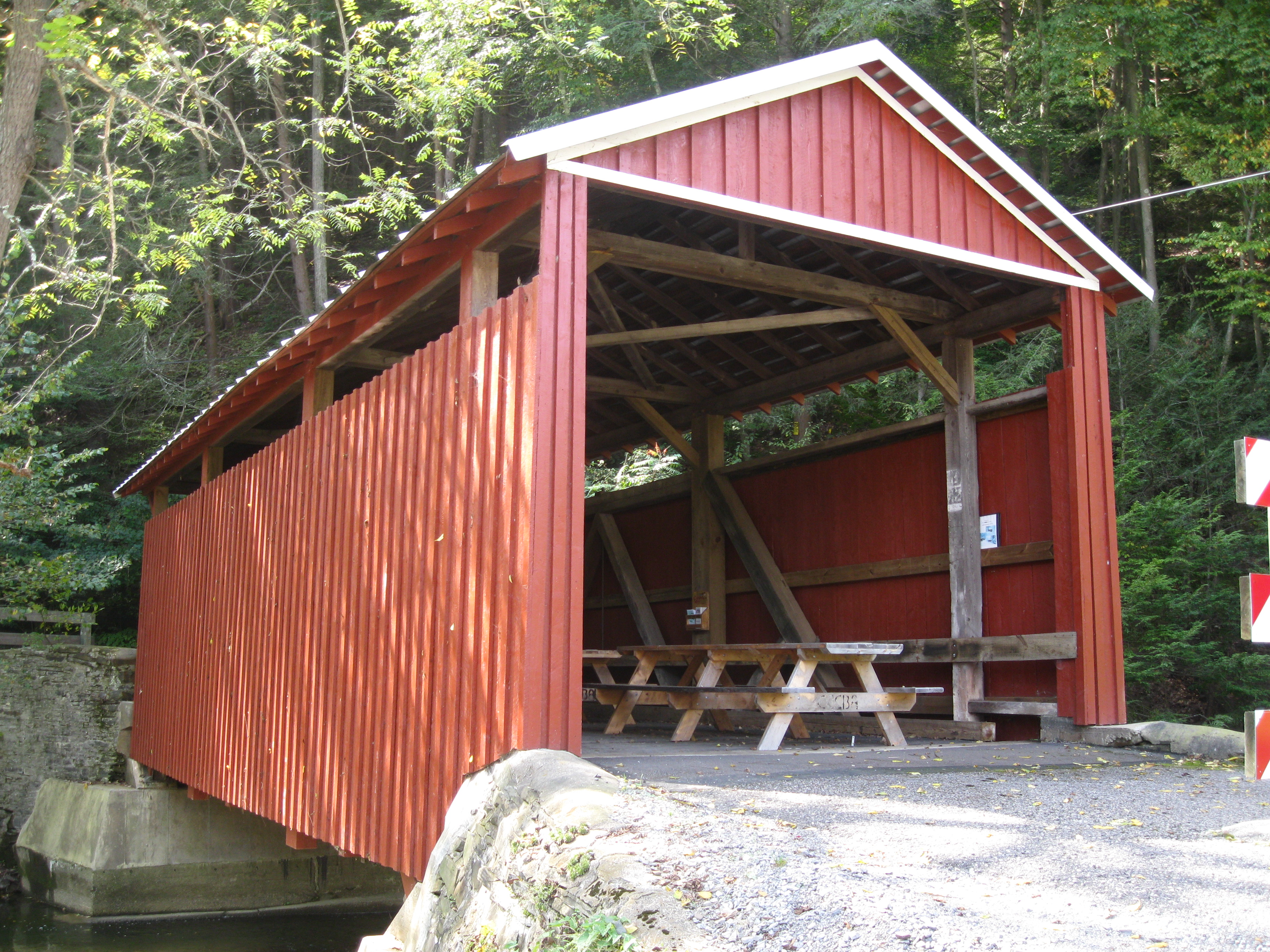
- The bridge, closed to traffic, with picnic tables inside in September 2012

- Location within Pennsylvania Location within the United States
- Location: Legislative Route 19053, north of Iola, Pine Township, Pennsylvania
- Coordinates: 41°9′5″N 76°32′10″W
- Area: 0.1 acres (0.040 ha)
- Built: 1881
- Built by: T.S. Christian
- Architectural style: Queen Post
- MPS: Covered Bridges of Columbia and Montour Counties TR
- NRHP reference No.: 79003192
- Added to NRHP: November 29, 1979

The Shoemaker Covered Bridge is a historic wooden covered bridge located at Pine Township in Columbia County, Pennsylvania. It is a 49-foot-long (15 m), Queen Post Truss bridge constructed in 1881. It crosses West Branch Run and is one of 28 historic covered bridges in Columbia and Montour Counties.

It was listed on the National Register of Historic Places in 1979.
