= Lisa Grabarek =

American educator

- Born: Louise Norris Grabarek; Washington, D.C., U.S.
- Other name: Lisa Grabarek Matthews
- Education: Vassar College; Yale University
- Occupation: educator
- Spouse: Bill Matthews
- Children: 3
- Parent(s): Wense Grabarek; Marion Norris

Louise "Lisa" Norris Grabarek is an American educator. She taught at St. Catherine's School in Richmond, Virginia and at St. Mary's School in Raleigh, North Carolina. Grabarek was the fourth woman to be ordained in a Southern Baptist Convention church.

== Early life and education ==
Grabarek is the daughter of Marion Pritchard Norris Grabarek, a member of the Junior League of Durham, and Wense Grabarek, a politician and civil rights activist who served as Mayor of Durham from 1963 to 1971.

She graduated from Calvert Method School, a predecessor to Durham Academy, in 1967.

Grabarek was presented to society as a debutante at the Durham Debutante Cotillion and Christmas Ball at the Durham Armory in the 1960s. She was vehemently opposed to being a debutante due to the exclusive nature of the tradition, but ultimately decided to be presented to appease her parents.

She studied at Vassar College. She obtained a masters degree in divinity from Yale Divinity School, graduating magna cum laude.

== Career ==
She was ordained as a Baptist preacher, as the fourth woman to be ordained by the convention, at Watts Street Baptist Church in 1974. Grabarek's ordination was approved by a council composed of clergy from both the Southern Baptist Convention and the American Baptist Association.

She worked as a humanities teacher at Saint Mary's School, an Episcopal boarding school for girls in Raleigh, North Carolina. She previously taught at St. Catherine's School, an all-girls Episcopal school in Richmond, Virginia.

== Personal life ==
She married Rev. Bill Matthews, a lawyer and former pastor at the United Church of Christ in Milford, Connecticut.

Grabarek attends Pullen Memorial Baptist Church in Raleigh.
