= Shingle Run (West Branch Run tributary) =

Coordinates: 41°10′07″N 76°32′14″W

Shingle Run Thumb Shingle Mill Run
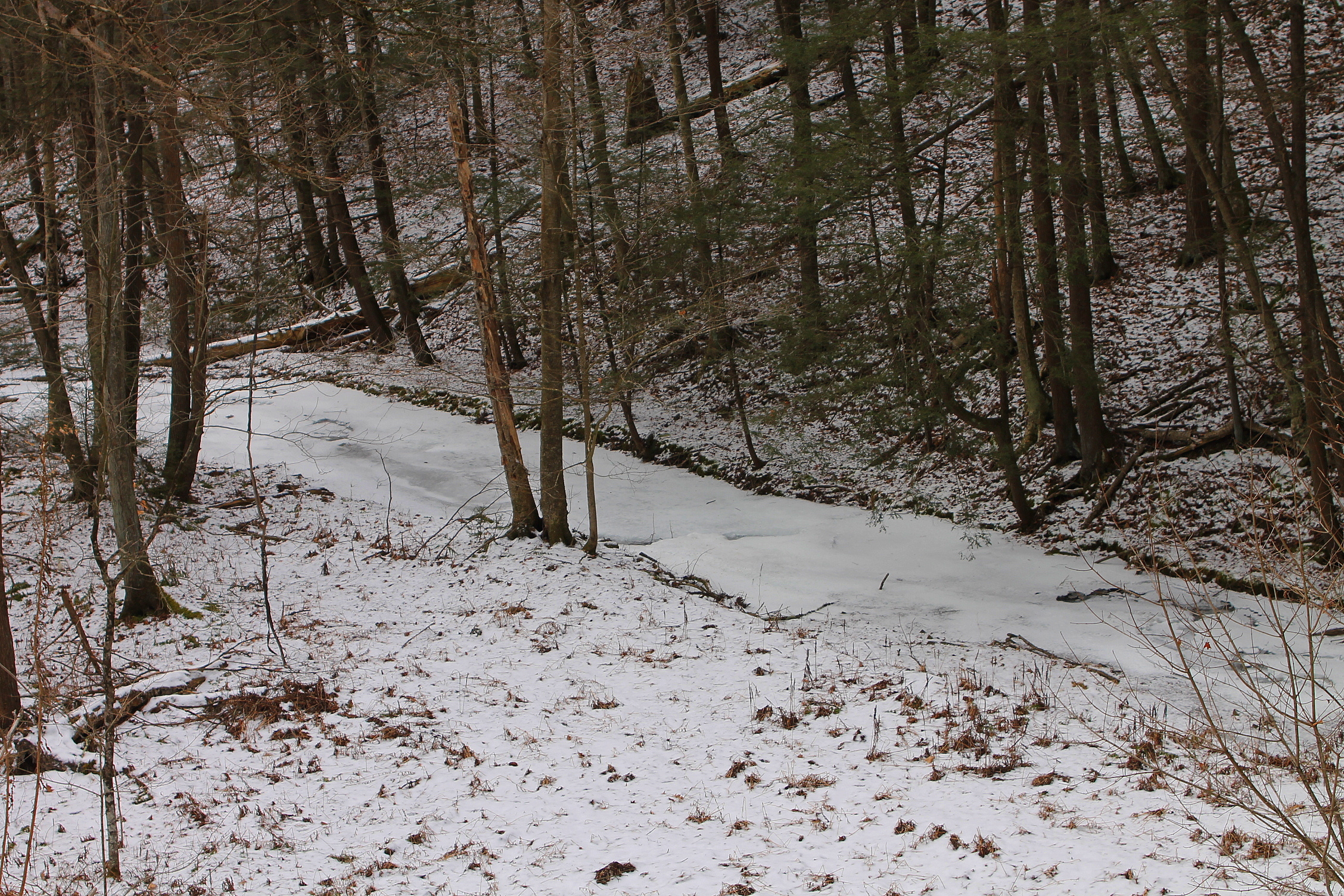
- Shingle Run in its lower reaches in wintertime

Physical characteristics
- Source
  - location: near Crist Hill Road in Jordan Township, Lycoming County, Pennsylvania
  - elevation: between 1,200 and 1,220 feet (370 and 370 m)
- Mouth
  - elevation: 794 ft (242 m)
- Length: 2.5 mi (4.0 km)
- Basin size: 1.63 mi^{2} (4.2 km^{2})

Basin features
- Progression: West Branch Run → Little Fishing Creek → Fishing Creek → Susquehanna River → Chesapeake Bay

Shingle Run is a tributary of West Branch Run in Lycoming County and Columbia County, in Pennsylvania, in the United States. It is approximately 2.5 miles (4.0 km) long and flows through Jordan Township, Lycoming County and Pine Township, Columbia County. Its watershed has an area of 1.63 square miles (4.2 km^{2}) and the stream has various unnamed tributaries. At least one bridge crosses the stream. The stream is inhabited by trout. It is named after nearby sawmills.

== Course ==
Shingle Run begins near Crist Hill Road in Jordan Township, Lycoming County and flows southwest for a few hundred feet. It then turns roughly south and exits Jordan Township and Lycoming County after several hundred feet.

Upon exiting Lycoming County, Shingle Run enters Pine Township, Columbia County and continues flowing roughly south, parallel to Shingle Run Road. After approximately a mile, the stream begins flowing nearly due south for more than a mile. Its valley becomes several hundred feet deep and it receives an unnamed tributary from the right. Eventually, it reaches its confluence with West Branch Run near California Hollow.

Shingle Run joins West Branch Run 1.82 miles (2.93 km) upstream of its mouth.

=== Tributaries ===
Shingle Run has a number of tributaries, which are smaller than the stream itself. However, none of them are named.

== Geography ==
The elevation near the mouth of Shingle Run is 794 feet (242 m) above sea level. The elevation of the stream's source is between 1,200 feet (370 m) and 1,220 feet (370 m) above sea level.

At least one bridge crosses Shingle Run. It carries State Route 4028.

== Watershed ==
The watershed of Shingle Run has an area of 1.63 square miles (4.2 km^{2}). Its watershed is part of the Lower North Branch Susquehanna River drainage basin. The stream is in the United States Geological Survey quadrangle of Lairdsville. Its mouth is in the southern part of Pine Township, Columbia County and is near the community of Pine Summit.

== History and etymology ==
Shingle Run was entered into the Geographic Names Information System on August 2, 1979. Its identifier in the Geographic Names Information System is 1187539. In the 19th century, the mouth of the stream was in a school district known as District No. 1.

A proposal was once made to replace a bridge crossing Shingle Run and to place cement concrete paving in its streambed, among other things.

Shingle Run is named after sawmills in its vicinity. It was labelled as "Thumb Shingle Mill Run" on a number of maps dating to the middle of the 19th century.

== Biology ==
Wild trout naturally reproduce in Shingle Run between its headwaters and its mouth.

== See also ==
- List of tributaries of Fishing Creek (North Branch Susquehanna River)
