= Judson College at Southeastern =

Christian college in North Carolina, US

Coordinates: 35.98037°N 78.51379°W

- Type: Private
- Established: 1994
- Affiliations: Southern Baptist Convention
- President: Daniel L. Akin
- Dean: Seth Bible
- Location: Wake Forest, North Carolina, US
- Campus: multiple sites
- Website: http://www.judsoncollege.com

Judson College (formerly "The College at Southeastern") is a Southern Baptist Christian college located in Wake Forest, North Carolina, United States. It is affiliated with the Southeastern Baptist Theological Seminary.

Judson College offers undergraduate associate and baccalaureate degree programs as well as a Master of Arts in Intercultural Studies.

The school is accredited by the Southern Association of Colleges and Schools. The college's enrollment in 2022 is approximately 650 students.

== History ==
Judson College (formerlyThe College at Southeastern) was formed on May 19, 1950 by a vote of the Southern Baptist Convention meeting in Chicago was established in 1994 to serve as the undergraduate school for Southeastern Baptist Theological Seminary. As a Baptist seminary school, all of its students are required to complete a major in Christian Studies.

In 1832, the Baptists of North Carolina purchased the 615-acre plantation of Dr. Calvin Jones for the purpose of establishing a teaching facility for young ministers. From 1951 to 1956, the current Appleby Hall housed the new Seminary. In 1956, when Wake Forest College moved to its new location in Winston-Salem, NC, Southeastern occupied the rest of the Wake Forest campus.

The Wake Forest Baptist Church was organized in 1835, and occupies the church building within the campus enclosure. Another historic landmark, the stone wall now surrounding the central campus, was begun about 1885 by Wake Forest College President Charles E. Taylor and “Dr. Tom” Jeffries. The wall was rebuilt by Doug Buttram, a Southeastern graduate, during 1990-1994.

In 2005, in an effort to accommodate the school's increasing enrollment, the college started construction of a new academic building. Originally named after Paige and Dorothy Patterson at its completion in 2008, it was renamed in January 2023 as Carson Hall in honor of Ralph Logan Carson, the first African American professor at the seminary. Carson Hall houses the Center for Faith and Culture, Judson College and the school's doctoral programs.

The Southeastern Board of Trustees changed the name of the college from Southeastern College at Wake Forest to the College at Southeastern in April 2008.

In January 2009, Dr. Bruce R. Ashford was installed as dean of the College at Southeastern. He made several important changes during his first few months, including new curriculum like minors in leadership and student ministry.

Dr. Jamie Dew succeeded Ashford in January 2013 as the dean of the college.

Judson College is marked by Ashford's and Dew's vision to give greater flexibility to students' academic pursuits. The History of Ideas Program engages students to research and read classical works that have shaped history from a Christian perspective. New majors were added such as Global Studies, Missions, Pre-Law, History, Biblical Studies and Worship Ministry.

In 2016, the College introduced the House System, of which there are five Houses. The Houses are named after missionaries George Liele, Andrew Fuller, Francis Schaeffer, Adoniram Judson, and David Brainerd. The House System, each year, has multiple competitions throughout the semester and these competitions ultimately determine which House wins the annual House Cup, which is awarded in the last month of the semester. In the five year history of the House System, the Judson House has won the most House Cups with three with Schaeffer House and Liele House tied for second most at one House Cup each. Fuller House won the most recent year in 2021-2022.

On October 15, 2024, the board of trustees renamed the college to Judson College, in honor of Adoniram Judson, a Baptist missionary who labored in Burma from 1813 until his death in 1860 and who was also instrumental in the founding of the first national Baptist convention in the United States to support international mission work.

== Accreditation ==
It is affiliated with the Southeastern Baptist Theological Seminary (Southern Baptist Convention).
