= Addie Elizabeth Davis =

First female American Southern Baptist pastor

- Born: June 29, 1917; Covington, Virginia, United States
- Died: December 3, 2005 (aged 88); Covington, Virginia, United States
- Education: Meredith College; Southeastern Baptist Theological Seminary
- Occupation: Pastor

Addie Elizabeth Davis (June 29, 1917 – December 3, 2005) was an American Southern Baptist religious leader. In 1964, she became the first woman to be ordained as a Southern Baptist pastor.

== Early life and education ==
Davis was born to a Baptist family in Covington, Virginia, on June 29, 1917. In 1942, Davis graduated from Meredith College with a major in psychology and a minor in speech. She became an education director at First Baptist Church in Elkin, North Carolina, and later dean of women at Alderson Broaddus College.

Davis's early career was interrupted in 1944, when her father's death forced her to return to Covington and help her mother with the family furniture store. While in Covington, she briefly served as the interim pastor of Lone Star Baptist Church.

== Ordination and career ==
In 1960, Davis began attending the Southeastern Baptist Theological Seminary in Wake Forest, North Carolina. While in Seminary, Davis attended Watts Street Baptist Church, which, along with its pastor Warren Carr, was known at the time for social progressivism and participation in the civil rights movement. For a History of Christianity course, Davis wrote a paper on the issue of women's ordination. Davis graduated in May 1963 along with six other women.

In 1963, Davis was granted a license to preach by the Watts Street church. On 9 August 1964, Davis was formally ordained at Watts Street Baptist Church after being rejected by several other churches, becoming the first woman to be ordained as a Southern Baptist pastor.

Following the ordination, Davis and the Watts Street church were subject to some criticism. Nevertheless, her ordination was, in practice, "entirely unnoticed" within the Southern Baptist Convention as a whole.

Following her ordination, Davis was rejected by Southern Baptist churches as a pastor. She instead became pastor for a series of American Baptist churches. In June 1972, Davis became a pastor at Second Baptist Church in East Providence, Rhode Island. She later became president of the East Providence Clergy Association.

=== Relation to the feminist movement ===
Davis's pastorship occurred during the second wave of the feminist movement. Although Davis did not make prominent statements about feminism, she did have Christian feminist literature in her possession.

== See also ==
- Ordination of women
- Complementarianism
- Second-wave feminism
