= Trinity Historic District =

Historic district in North Carolina, United States

- U.S. National Register of Historic Places
- U.S. Historic district
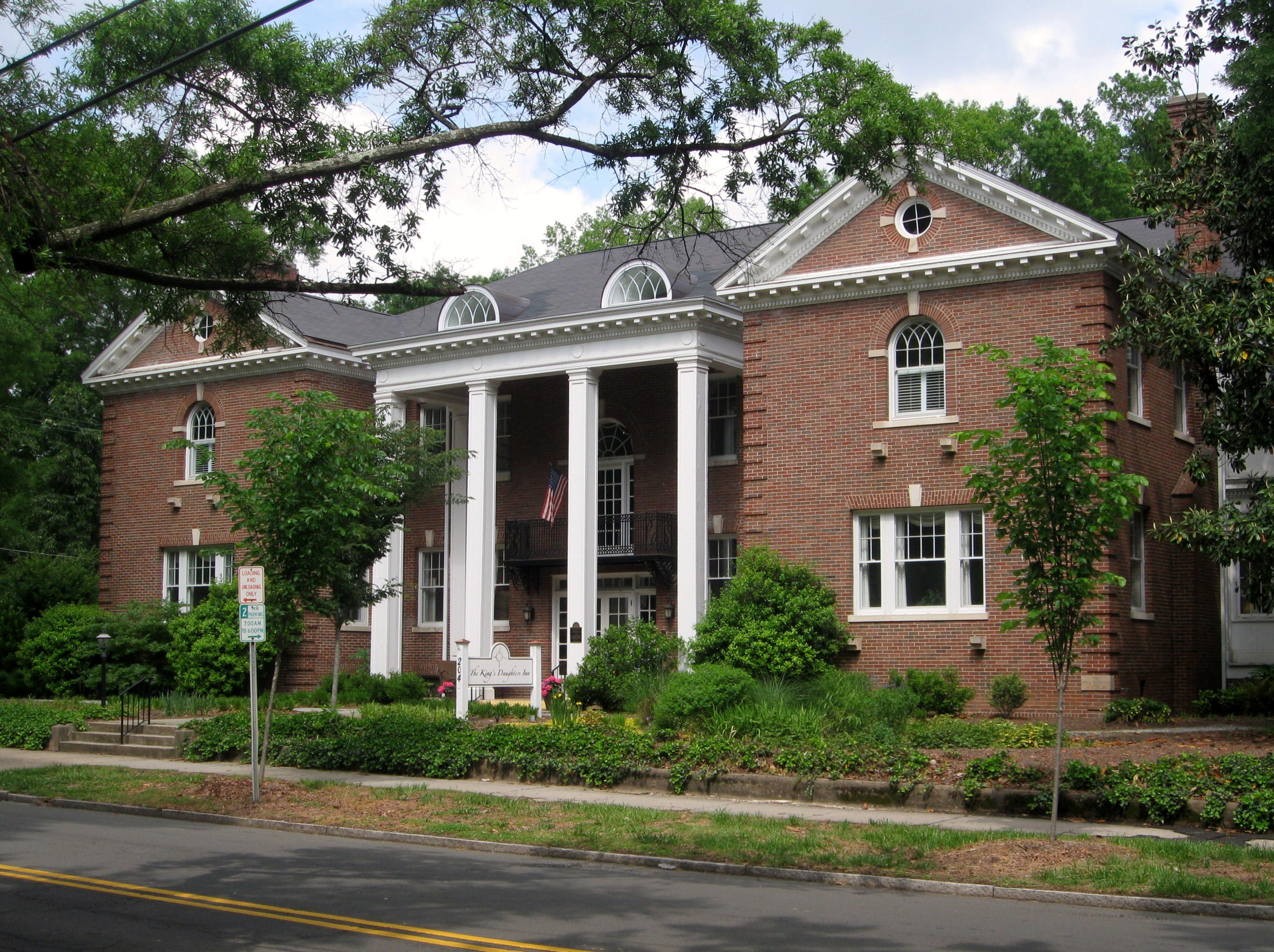
- The King's Daughters Inn, May 2011

- Location within North Carolina Location within the United States
- Location: Roughly bounded by Green, Duke, Morgan, and W. Main Sts., Markham Ave., and Clarendon St.; also roughly bounded by the original Trinity Historic District, N. Buchanan Boulevard, W. Club Boulevard, Woodland Dr., and N. Duke St.; also 209-215 N. Gregson St., Durham, North Carolina
- Coordinates: 36°00′22″N 78°54′43″W
- Area: 281.9 acres (114.1 ha)
- Built: 1890
- Architect: Barton, Harry; Davis, Archie Royal; Et al.
- Architectural style: Late 19th And 20th Century Revivals, Bungalow/craftsman, Queen Anne
- MPS: Durham MRA
- NRHP reference No.: 86000672, 04000568, 07001372
- Added to NRHP: March 26, 1986, June 4, 2004 (Boundary Increase), January 9, 2008 (Boundary Increase)

Trinity Historic District, also called Trinity Park, is a national historic district and residential area located near the East Campus of Duke University in Durham, North Carolina. The district encompasses 751 contributing buildings in a predominantly residential section of Durham. They were built between the 1890s and 1960 and include notable examples of Queen Anne and Bungalow / American Craftsman style architecture. Located in the district are the separately listed "Faculty Row" cottages: the Bassett House, Cranford-Wannamaker House, Crowell House, and Pegram House. Other notable buildings include the George W. Watts School (1917); Julian S. Carr Junior High School (1922); Durham School of the Arts, originally built as Durham High School (1923); Durham Alliance Church (1927); Trinity Avenue Presbyterian Church (1925); Watts Street Baptist Church (1925); Great A & P Tea Company (1927–1929); Grace Lutheran Church (c. 1950); and the former Greek Orthodox Community Church (c. 1950).

It was listed on the National Register of Historic Places in 1986, with a boundary increase in 2004 and 2008.

== Notable buildings ==
- Bassett House
- Cranford-Wannamaker House
- Crowell House
- Pegram House
- Powe House
- Trinity Avenue Presbyterian Church
- Watts Street Baptist Church

== Notable residents ==
Notable current and former residents of Trinity Park include:

- John Spencer Bassett, Duke University professor
- Joseph Penn Breedlove, first librarian of Duke University
- John Franklin Crowell, Trinity College president
- William Preston Few, first president of Duke University
- George B. Pegram, Manhattan Project physicist
- Justin Tornow, dancer and choreographer

== Gallery ==
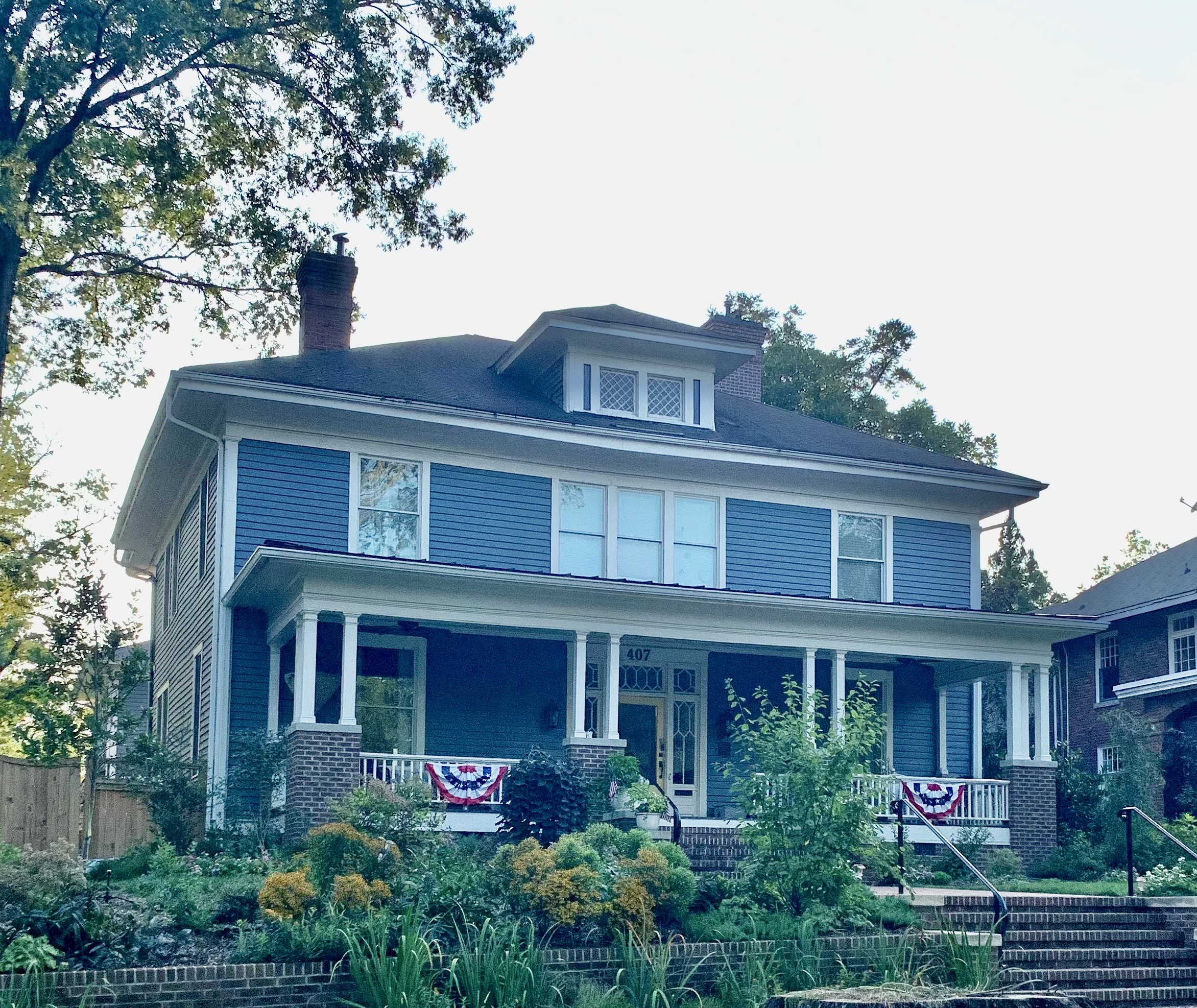
Joseph Penn Breedlove house (1915), 407 Watts St.

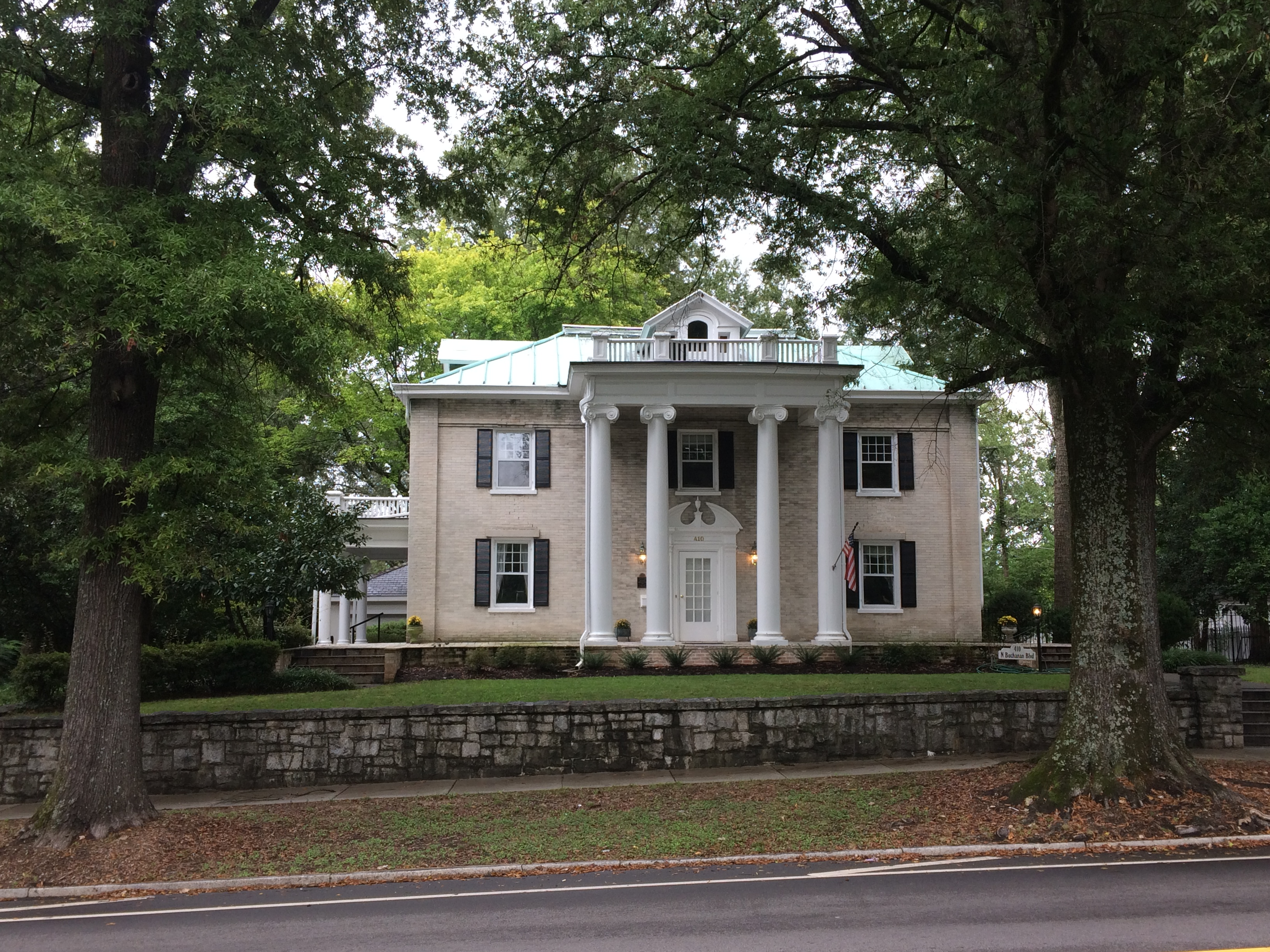
Bassett-Brown house

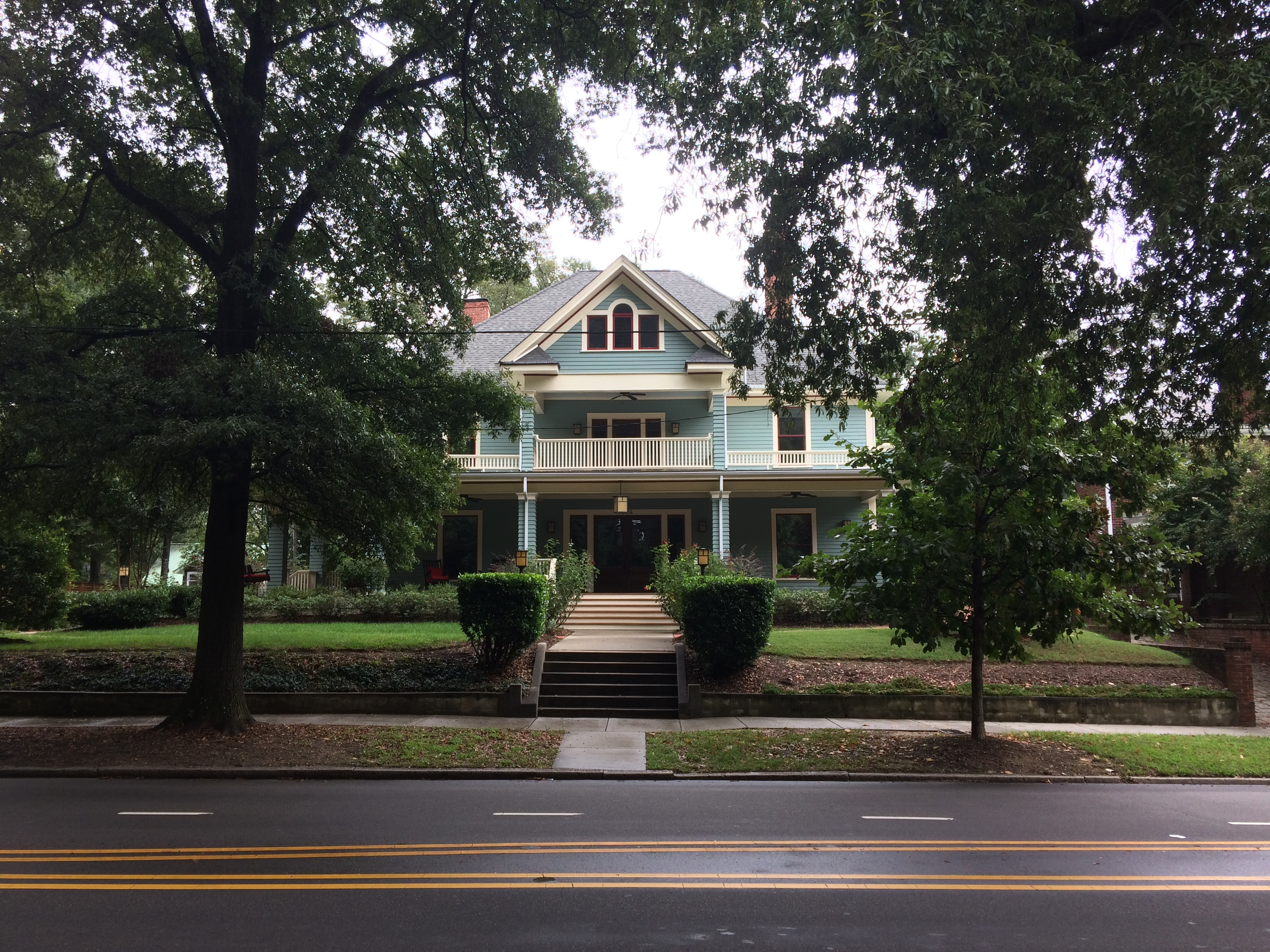
Cranford house

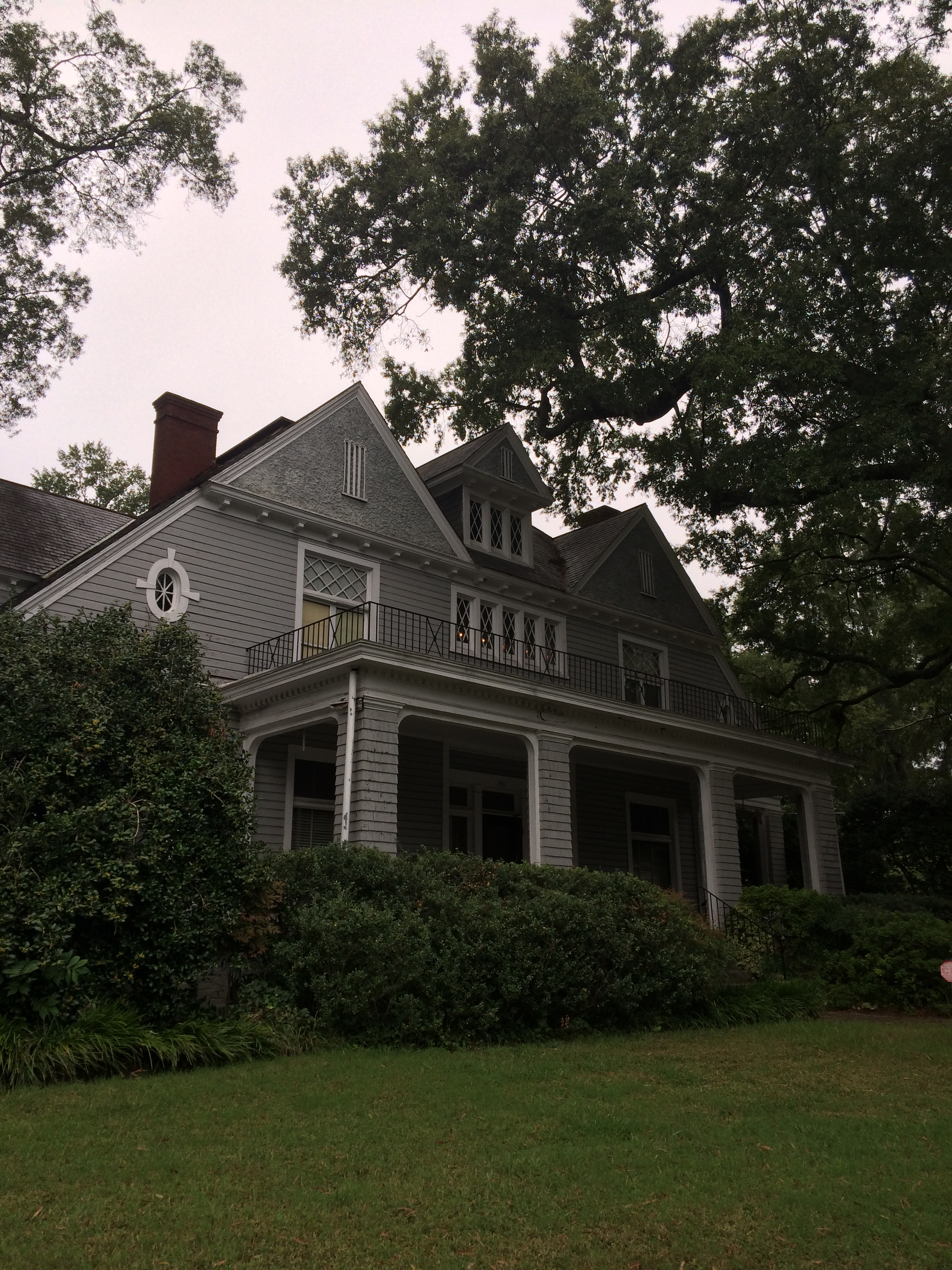

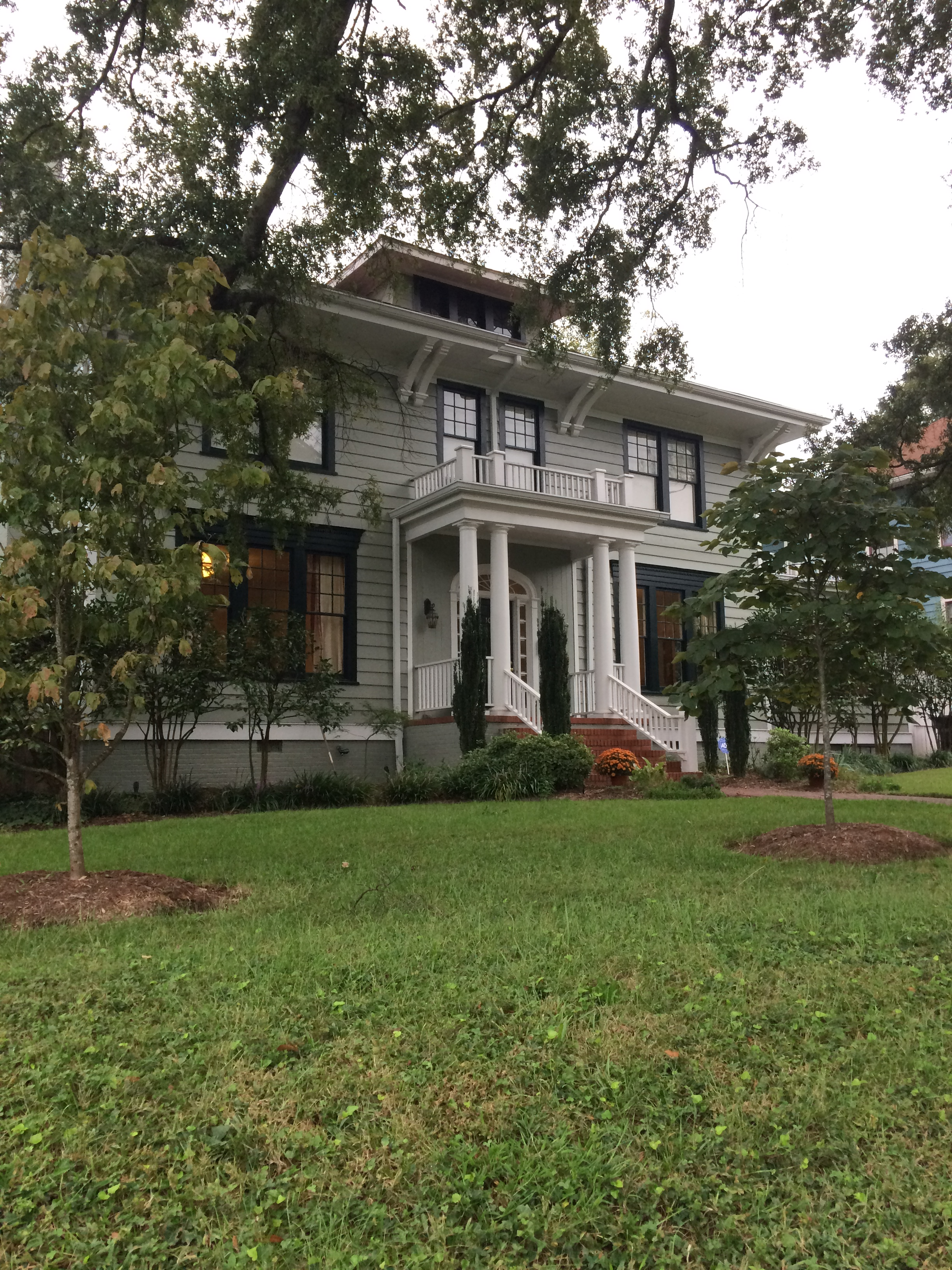

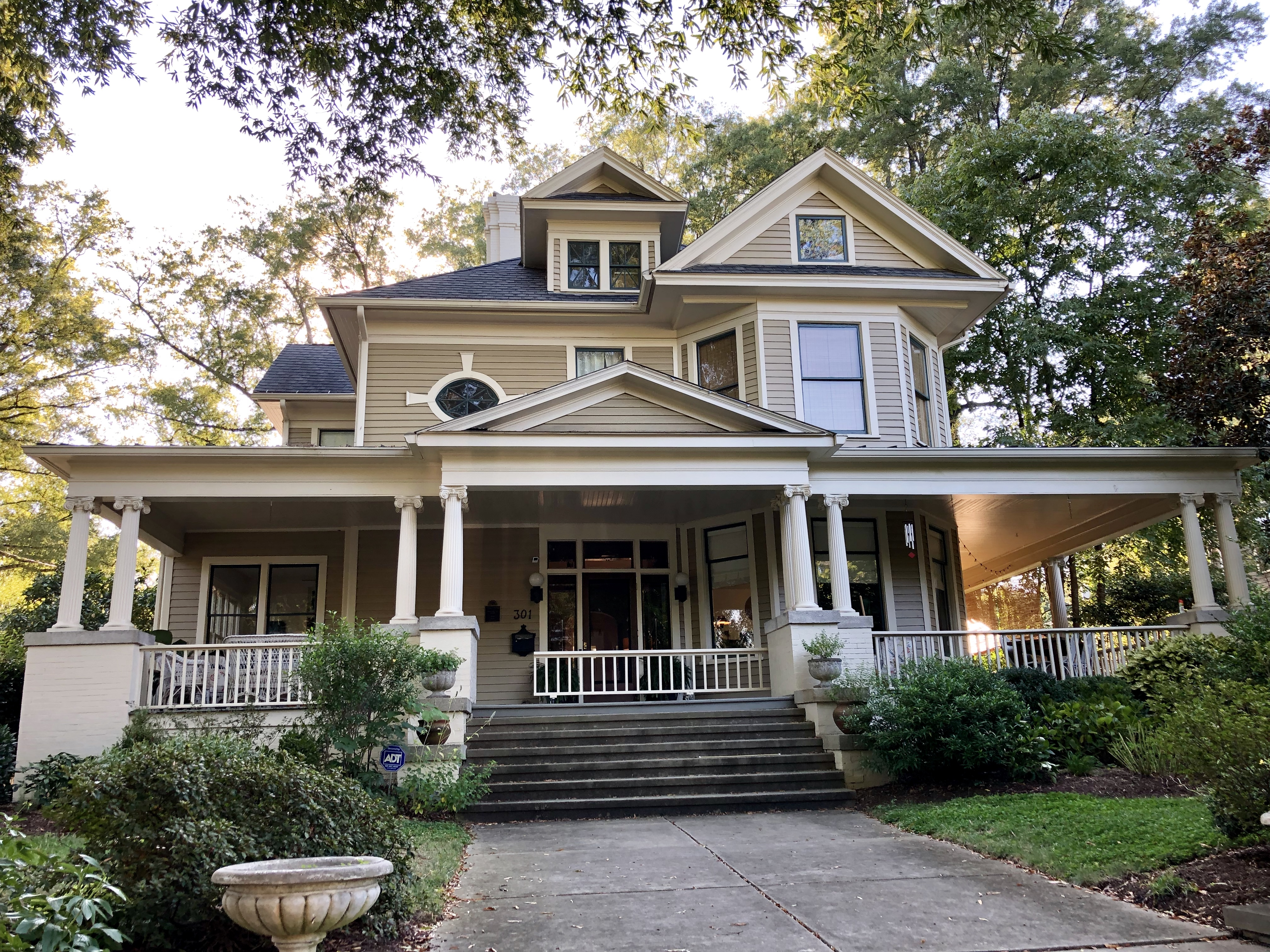
