= William Randall Lolley =

American Christian clergyman (1931–2022)

W. Randall Lolley
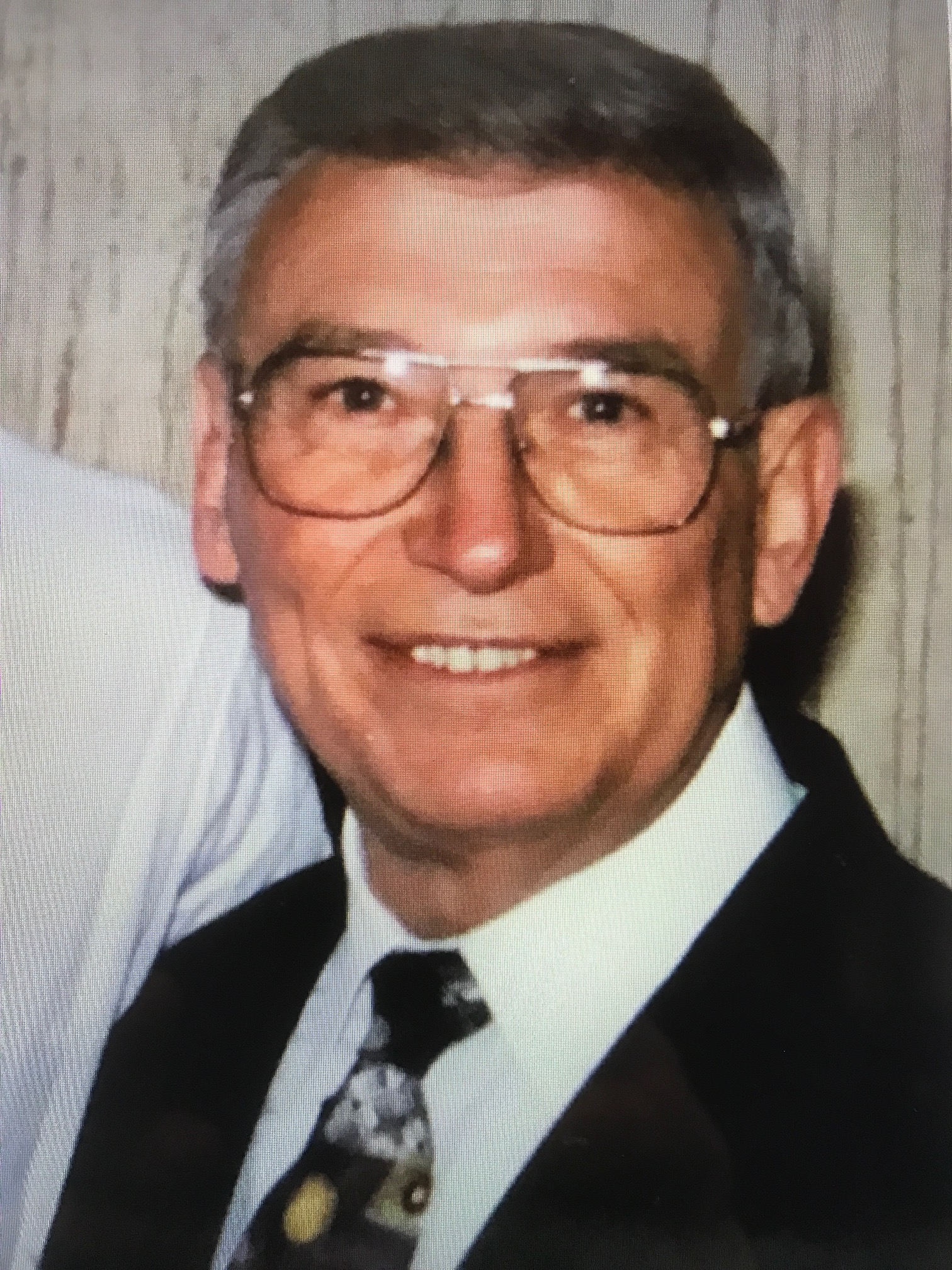

3rd President of Southeastern Baptist Theological Seminary
- In office 1974–1988
- Preceded by: Olin T. Binkley
- Succeeded by: Lewis A. Drummond

Personal details
- Born: June 2, 1931 Troy, Alabama
- Died: March 21, 2022 (aged 90) Raleigh, North Carolina
- Spouse: Clara Lou Jacobs
- Education: Howard College; Southeastern Baptist Theological Seminary
- Occupation: Theologian

William Randall Lolley (June 2, 1931 – March 21, 2022) was an American Christian clergyman of the Baptist tradition. His principal contribution to religious and academic life was a 14-year presidency (1974–1988) of the Southeastern Baptist Theological Seminary in the town of Wake Forest, North Carolina. Lolley's leadership of the seminary—one of six owned by the Southern Baptist Convention—ended as a result of theological and political strife within the denomination.

Lolley became the first SBC institution or agency head to resign his position in protest of what some termed a "conservative resurgence," and others called a "fundamentalist takeover." Subsequently, in recognition of his support of faculty in the face of criticism regarding their fidelity to traditional Baptist teaching, Lolley received the prestigious Alexander Meiklejohn Award for Academic Freedom, awarded in 1988 by the American Association of University Professors.

Following his seminary resignation, Lolley returned to the pastorate of local Baptist congregations in North Carolina.

== Early life and education ==
Born June 2, 1931, in Troy, Alabama, Lolley spent his formative years in the small town of Samson, near the Florida state line. There he attended local public schools, graduating as valedictorian of Samson High School. Matriculating in Birmingham's Howard College (now Samford University) in 1949, he earned the Bachelor of Arts degree in 1952, with majors in psychology and history.

After two years teaching history and science at Starke University (military/secondary) School in Birmingham, Lolley enrolled in the Bachelor of Divinity program at the relatively new Southeastern Baptist Theological Seminary. There he earned two degrees, the B.D. (Bachelor of Divinity) and the Th.M. (Master of Theology), in 1957 and 1958, respectively. During his senior year he presided over the student body and completed all courses with a perfect 4.0 grade point average, graduating summa cum laude.

Following a two-year stint serving the First Baptist Church of Greensboro (N.C.) as an assistant pastor, Lolley furthered his divinity training at Southwestern Baptist Theological Seminary, Fort Worth, Tx., graduating in 1964 with the degree Doctor of Theology (Th.D.).

== Ministry career ==
Lolley divided his post-graduate ministry career between church pastorates and the presidency of his alma mater. Called to the leadership of the First Baptist Church of Winston-Salem, North Carolina, in 1962, he yielded that position 12 years later to become the third president of Southeastern Seminary.

Impressive student body, faculty, and program growth marked Lolley's 14 years at the seminary. But emerging division within the host Southern Baptist denomination produced conflicting visions regarding the purpose and character of its theological schools. By early 1987 the trustee balance at Southeastern tilted in favor of doctrinal conservatives. Lolley, who had led the school from a moderate/conservative posture, resigned his presidency, citing what he regarded as an "alien vision" that threatened the academic integrity of his institution.

Fifty-six years of age at the time, Lolley elected to resume his earlier ministry as a local church pastor. Beginning at the First Baptist Church of North Carolina's capital city of Raleigh, he concluded his formal career in nearby Greensboro, retiring from its First Baptist Church in late 1996.

Lolley's post-retirement years were occupied with the interim pastorates of a dozen Baptist churches, ranging from Washington D.C. to Jacksonville, Florida. In 1999 he was elected to a one-year post as Moderator of the Cooperative Baptist Fellowship of North Carolina, a quasi-denominational group of churches and individuals, whose formation he had enthusiastically supported.

== Honors ==
- Honorary degrees, including Doctor of Divinity, Wake Forest University (1971); Doctor of Divinity, Samford University (1980); Doctor of Divinity, University of Richmond (1984); Doctor of Humane Letters, Campbell University (1985); Doctor of Laws, Mercer University (1988).
- Presidential Award, Campbell University, 1974
- Distinguished Service Award, Christian Life Commission of the Southern Baptist Convention, 1974
- Denominational Service Award, Samford University, 1976
- Distinguished Alumnus Award, Southwestern Seminary, 1979
- Alexander Meiklejohn Award for Academic Freedom, American Association of University Professors, 1988

== Writings ==
Lolley's writings include more than 100 articles, sermons, and curriculum materials for Baptist and other publications:

- Contributor, Crises in Morality, Broadman Press, 1963
- Contributor, Southeastern Studies, Vol. 1, 1979
- Co-editor, Bold Preaching about Christ, Broadman Press, 1980
- Contributor, Servant Songs: Reflections on the History and Mission of Southeastern Baptist Theological Seminary, 1950-1988, Smyth & Helwys Publishing Co., 1994
- Author, Journey with Me: Redemptive Threads Woven Through the Bible, Nurturing Faith, Inc, 2015

== Family ==
In 1952, the newly ordained Lolley married fellow Alabamian Clara Lou Jacobs, who was completing her studies at Troy State Teachers College. The marriage brought forth two daughters, Charlotte Lynn Murphy and Pamela Jo Frey.

Lolley's brother Thomas Ervin "Tom" Lolley (1937–2004), also a graduate of Southeastern Seminary, likewise pastored local North Carolina churches and served as an area missionary for the state's Baptist convention.

== Death ==
Randall Lolley died on March 21, 2022, following a stroke suffered at his memory care residence in Raleigh, North Carolina. He was 90 years old. His wife Lou Lolley died less than a year later on January 19, 2023. Both are buried at Sunset Memorial Gardens near Geneva, Alabama, Lou Lolley’s hometown.
