= T.S. Christian =

American architect

T.S. Christian is the name of one or more builders of significant structures that are listed in the U.S. National Register of Historic Places in Pennsylvania and in North Carolina.

T.S. Christian was builder of at least two covered bridges in Pennsylvania in 1881:

- Creasyville Covered Bridge, built 1881, SR 683, Millville, PA, NRHP-listed
- Shoemaker Covered Bridge, built 1881, SR 19053, Iola, PA, NRHP-listed

T.S. Christian, possibly the same or possibly a different person, was a building contractor in Durham, North Carolina, who built several houses in Queen Anne or similar styles, c.1890. They were the original group of faculty houses associated with a Trinity College, which became Duke University. The houses are:

- Bassett House, built 1891, 1017 W. Trinity Ave., Durham, NC, NRHP-listed
- Cranford-Wannamaker House, built 1891, 1019 W. Trinity Ave., Durham, NC, NRHP-listed
- Crowell House, built 1891, 504 Watts St., Durham, NC, NRHP-listed
- Pegram House, built 1891, 1019 Minerva Ave., Durham, NC, NRHP-listed

All four houses have been moved. T.S. Christian served two-year terms starting in 1905, 1907, and 1915 in some Durham committee or legislative body.
