= Crowell House (Durham, North Carolina) =

Historic house in North Carolina, United States

- U.S. National Register of Historic Places
- U.S. Historic district – Contributing property
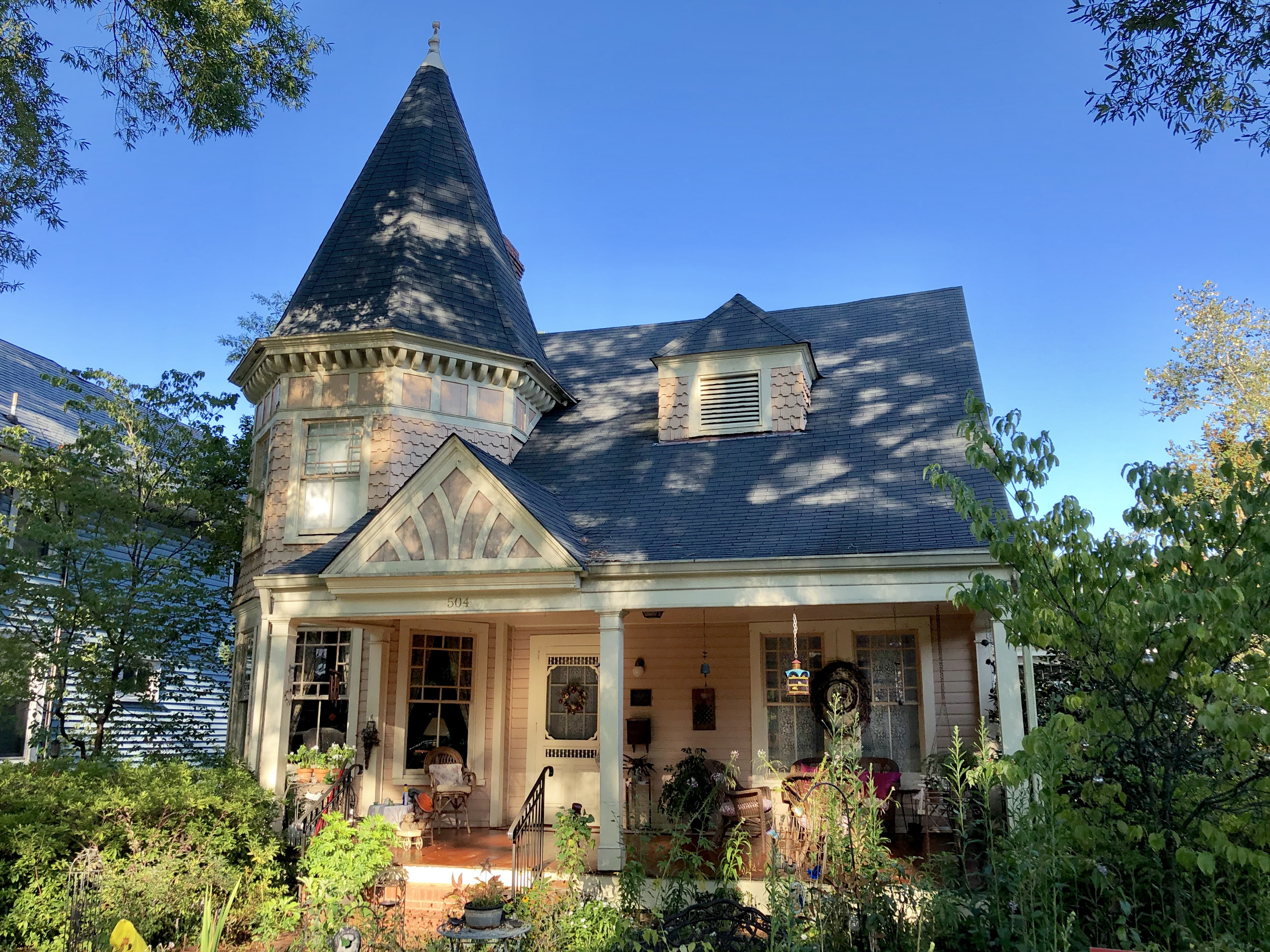
- Crowell House, August 2019

- Location within North Carolina Location within the United States
- Location: 504 Watts St., Durham, North Carolina
- Coordinates: 36°0′22″N 78°54′41″W
- Area: less than one acre
- Built: 1891
- Built by: Christian, T.S.
- Architectural style: Shingle Style
- MPS: Faculty Avenue Houses TR
- NRHP reference No.: 79003332
- Added to NRHP: November 29, 1979

Crowell House is a historic home located at Durham, Durham County, North Carolina. It was built in 1891 by local contractor T.S. Christian, and is a two-story, Shingle Style dwelling.

It was listed on the National Register of Historic Places in 1979. It is located in the Trinity Historic District.

== Former residents ==
- John Franklin Crowell
