= L. Russ Bush =

Luther Russell Bush III (December 25, 1944 – January 22, 2008) was an American academic, theologian, and professor of religion at Southwestern Baptist Theological Seminary, and Southeastern Baptist Theological Seminary. The book he co-authored with fellow Southwestern professor Tom J. Nettles, Baptists and the Bible, helped fuel the Southern Baptist Convention conservative resurgence. Bushed served a term as president of the Evangelical Theological Society and founded the L. Russ Bush Center for Faith and Culture at Southeastern.

== Early life and family ==
Bush was born on Christmas Day, 1944, in Alexandria, Louisiana, to Luther Russell Bush, Jr., and his wife Sara Frances née Warnock. During his childhood, the family moved to Columbia, Mississippi, where his father started a dental practice and his mother ran a Christian bookstore. At the age of twelve, Bush made a confession of faith and was baptized into the First Baptist Church of Columbia, Mississippi. He went on to attend Mississippi College where he met Cynthia Ellen McGraw, whom he married on June 2, 1968.

== Education ==
Bush earned his B.A. (1967) from Mississippi College, and his M.Div. (1970) and Ph.D. (1975) from Southwestern Baptist Theological Seminary.

== Career ==
Bush first joined the faculty of Southwestern as a teaching assistant while pursuing his doctoral studies, and continued to serve as professor of philosophy of religion from 1973 until 1989. From 1989 until his retirement in 2006, he served as academic vice president and dean of the faculty at Southeastern Baptist Theological Seminary.

== Publications ==
- Baptists and the Bible: The Baptist Doctrines of Biblical Inspiration and Religious Authority in Historical Perspective (1980) ISBN 0802404669
- A Handbook for Christian Philosophy (1991) ISBN 0310518210
- Psalms 90-150 (2000) ISBN 080540113X
- The Advancement: Keeping the Faith in an Evolutionary Age (2003) ISBN 0805430342
