= Wense Grabarek =

American politician (1919–2019)

Mayor of Durham, North Carolina
- In office 1963–1971

Member of the Durham City Council
- In office 1957–1961

Personal details
- Born: May 21, 1919 Luzerne, Pennsylvania, U.S.
- Died: December 15, 2019 (aged 100)
- Party: Democratic Party
- Spouse: Marion Pritchard Norris
- Children: 4 (including Lisa Grabarek)
- Education: Benjamin Franklin University
- Occupation: politician, accountant

Robert Wensell "Wense" Grabarek (May 21, 1919 – December 15, 2019) was an American politician who served as mayor of Durham, North Carolina, from 1963 to 1971. Greeted upon entering office with mass civil rights demonstrations, Grabarek was credited with striking a tone of moderation. He established the "Durham Interim Committee", composed of two black and nine white members, with a mandate to "resolve and reconcile" racial differences. Over the next few months, segregation ended at most of Durham's restaurants, hotels and movie theaters, swimming pools, libraries, the chamber of commerce, and the Jaycees. Grabarek also served on the Durham City Council from 1957 to 1961.

Grabarek was born in Luzerne, Pennsylvania. He served in the United States Army during World War II. He graduated from Benjamin Franklin University and worked as an accountant. He was married to Marion Pritchard Norris and had four children, including Lisa Grabarek. Grabarek, his wife, and family moved to Durham, North Carolina in the 1950s. he died in 2019.

Preceded by Emanuel J. Evans	Mayor of Durham, North Carolina; 1963 – 1971	Succeeded by James Hawkins
