= Southeastern Baptist Theological Seminary =

Seminary of the Southern Baptist Convention in Wake Forest, North Carolina

- Motto: Go Make Disciples
- Type: Private
- Established: 1950
- Religious affiliation: Southern Baptist Convention
- Academic affiliations: ATS; SACSCOC
- Endowment: $43.76 Million
- President: R. Scott Pace
- Academic staff: 61
- Students: 4,484
- Location: Wake Forest, North Carolina, United States; 35.981°N 78.512°W
- Website: www.sebts.edu

Southeastern Baptist Theological Seminary (SEBTS) is a Baptist seminary in Wake Forest, North Carolina. It is affiliated with the Southern Baptist Convention. It was created in 1950 to meet a need in the SBC's East Coast region. It was voted into existence on May 19, 1950, at the SBC annual meeting and began offering classes in the fall of 1951 on the original campus of Wake Forest University (then Wake Forest College). The undergraduate program is called Judson College at Southeastern. The current president is R. Scott Pace.

It has been accredited by the Association of Theological Schools in the United States and Canada (ATS) since 1958 and by the Commission on Colleges of the Southern Association of Colleges and Schools (SACS) since 1978.

== History ==
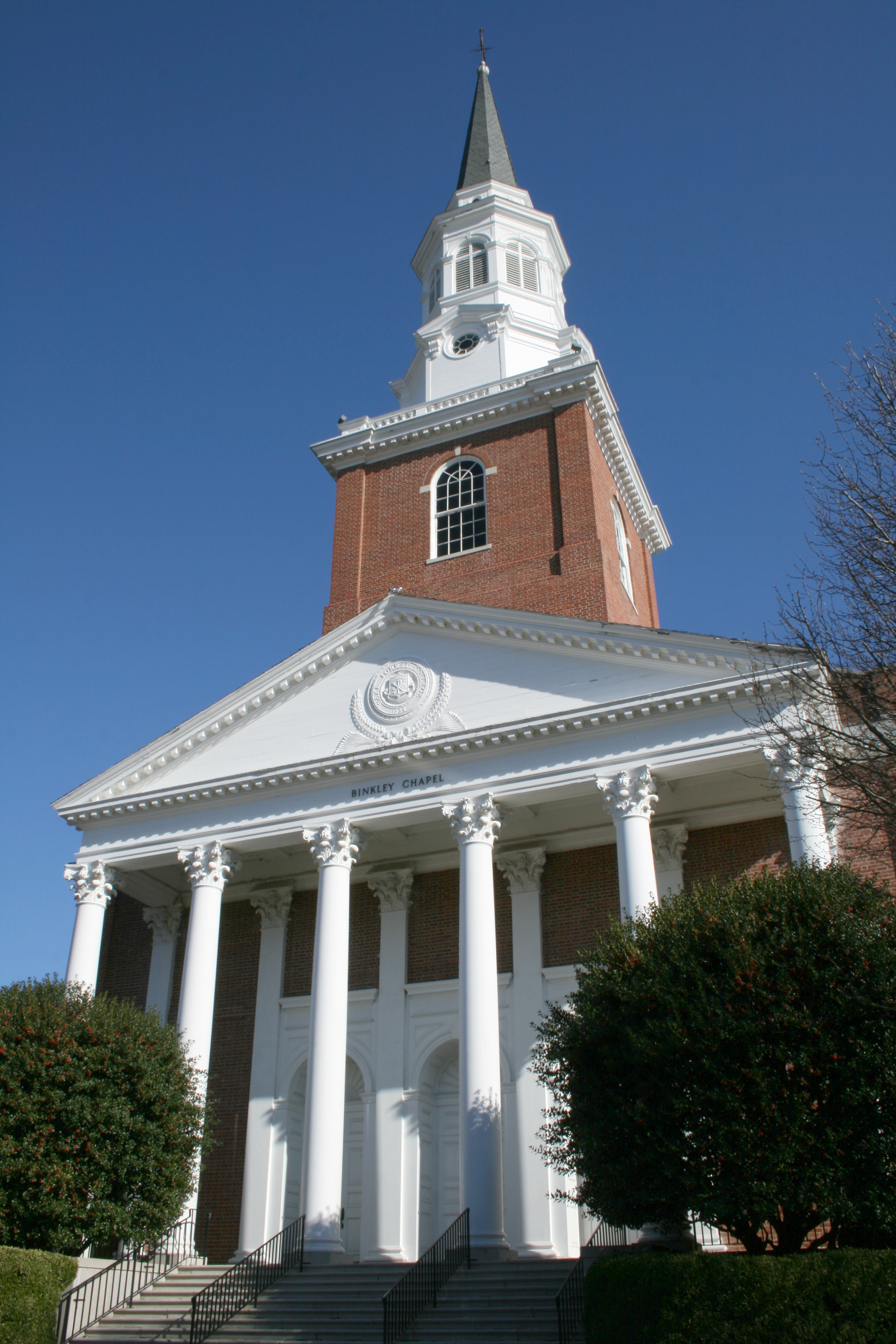
Binkley Chapel

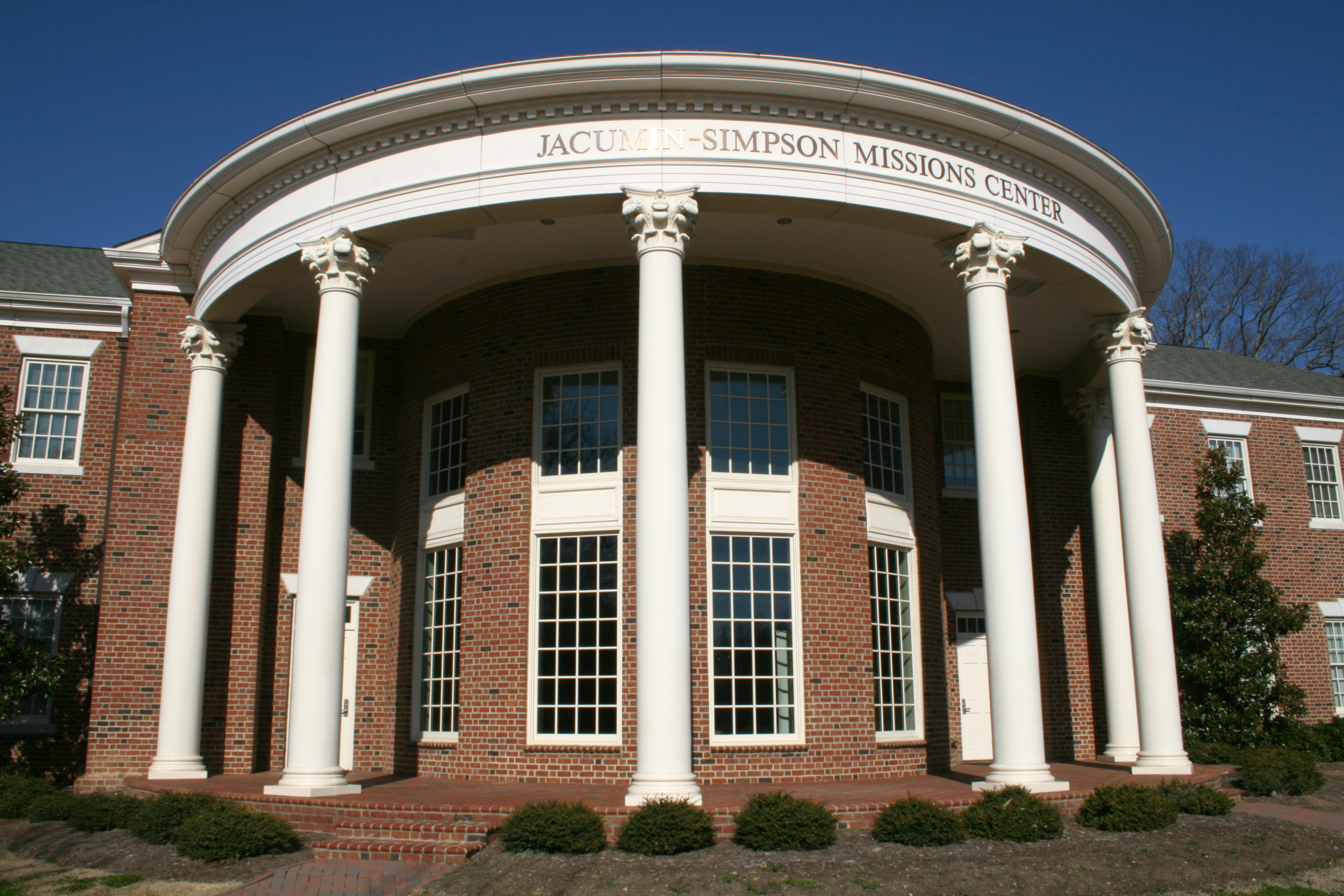
Jacumin-Simpson Missions Center

The seminary, under the presidency of Sydnor L. Stealey, began offering classes in 1951 on the campus of Wake Forest College. When the college moved in 1956 to Winston-Salem, North Carolina, Southeastern acquired the whole campus. In 1963, Stealey retired and Olin T. Binkley was elected the new president. Under his leadership, the Bachelor of Divinity (B.Div.) degree transitioned into the Master of Divinity (M.Div.) degree, and the Master of Religious Education (MRE) and the Doctor of Ministry (D.Min.) degrees were instituted. Binkley was also an equal-rights supporter. He retired in 1974 and was succeeded by W. Randall Lolley. During his presidency, enrollment at the seminary more than doubled. Under demands from an increasingly fundamentalist Board of Trustees, Lolley resigned in 1987 and was succeeded the following year by Lewis A. Drummond. Billy Graham attended Drummond's inauguration. Drummond's time was marked by a large amount of turnover in the faculty and a decline in enrollment. He retired in the spring of 1992. The fifth elected president of Southeastern was L. Paige Patterson, a theological and political conservative, who reorganized the seminary on conservative lines, as well as upgrading degree programs and introducing doctoral degrees. Patterson's years at the school were another season of growth. He took the same position at Southwestern Baptist Theological Seminary in 2004, being replaced by Daniel L. Akin, who took a similar approach.

In 2006, Southeastern opened the L. Russ Bush Center for Faith and Culture, named in honor of L. Russ Bush, who served as Southeastern’s academic dean under both Drummond and Patterson. In October of that year, Southeastern dedicated the Prince Building for facilities management. Patterson Hall was dedicated in 2008 to house classrooms and academic suites for several of Southeastern’s programs and initiatives, including The L. Russ Bush Center for Faith and Culture, The Center for Preaching and Pastoral Leadership, Global Theological Initiatives, and twenty-two faculty offices.

Lea Laboratory was built in 1887–88, and was listed on the National Register of Historic Places in 1975.

The seminary was granted an exception to Title IX in 2016, allowing it to legally discriminate against LGBT students for religious reasons.

In 2017, a campus was established in the Nash Correctional Institution prison in Nashville, North Carolina. During the same year, the Keith and Kristyn Getty song "For the Cause" was dedicated as the official Southeastern hymn.

=== Presidents ===
No.	Name	Term
1	Sydnor L. Stealey	1952–1963
2	Olin T. Binkley	1963–1974
3	W. Randall Lolley	1974–1988
4	Lewis A. Drummond	1988–1992
5	L. Paige Patterson	1992–2003
–	Bart C. Neal (Note: Neal served as interim president.)	2003–2004
6	Daniel L. Akin	2004–2026
7	R. Scott Pace	2026–present

== Notable alumni ==
- Sam Currin, lawyer and judge
- Addie Elizabeth Davis, first woman ordained as a Southern Baptist pastor
- Will Graham (evangelist), grandson of Billy Graham and evangelist
- Mark Harris, politician
- Johnny Hunt, president of the Southern Baptist Convention and pastor
- Elizabeth Mburu, biblical scholar and first female PhD graduate from Southeastern Baptist Theological Seminary
- Jeff Struecker, Army Ranger portrayed in Black Hawk Down
