= Pearl Mill Village Historic District =

Historic district in North Carolina, United States

- U.S. National Register of Historic Places
- U.S. Historic district
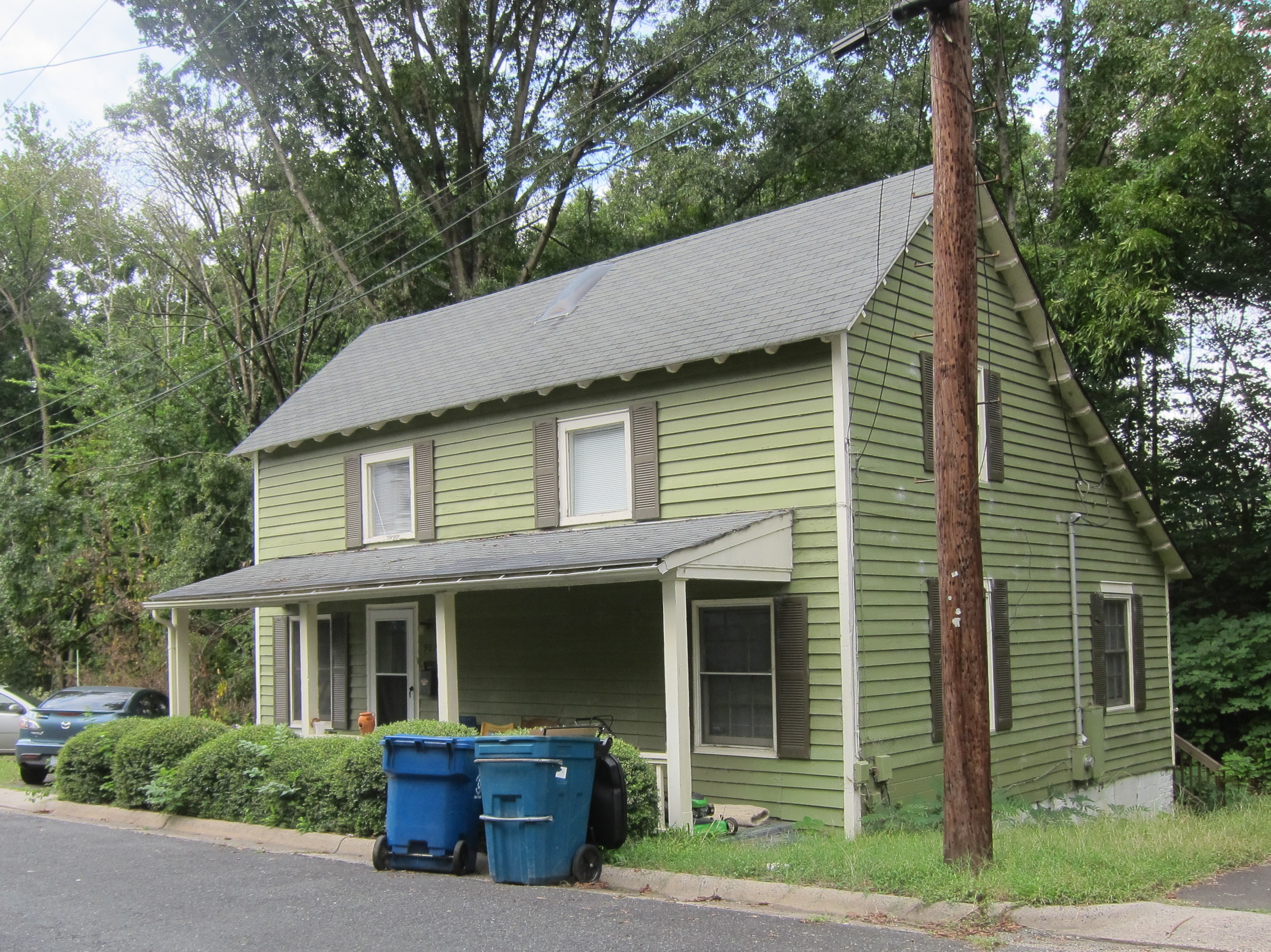

- Location within North Carolina Location within the United States
- Location: 900 Blk. of Washington and Orient Sts. between Trinity and Dacien Aves., Durham, North Carolina
- Coordinates: 36°00′19″N 78°54′08″W
- Area: 6.3 acres (2.5 ha)
- Built: c. 1905, c. 1924
- Architectural style: Bungalow/craftsman
- MPS: Durham MRA
- NRHP reference No.: 85001782
- Added to NRHP: August 9, 1985

Pearl Mill Village Historic District is a national historic district located at Durham, Durham County, North Carolina. The district encompasses 26 contributing residential buildings built by owners of Pearl Cotton Mills. The mill village dwellings are either two-story duplex type built about 1905 or a one-story bungalow constructed about 1924.

It was listed on the National Register of Historic Places in 1985.
