= Daniel L. Akin =

Theological seminary president and author

President of Southeastern Baptist Theological Seminary
- In office January 2004 – present
- Preceded by: Paige Patterson

Personal details
- Born: January 2, 1957 (age 69) Forest Park, Georgia
- Spouse: Charlotte Tammy Bourne
- Children: Nathan, Jonathan, Paul, Timothy
- Education: University of Texas at Arlington
- Profession: Theological seminary president and author
- Website: www.danielakin.com

Daniel Lowell "Danny" Akin (born January 2, 1957) serves as President Emeritus and Ambassador for Southeastern Baptist Theological Seminary and Judson College in Wake Forest, North Carolina, after retiring as the seminary and college's sixth president in July 2026. A leader in the Southern Baptist Convention (SBC), he has authored and edited numerous books and journal articles and is best known for his commitment to expository preaching and to the Great Commission.

== Early life ==
Akin was born and spent his early years in Forest Park, Georgia, outside of Atlanta. In high school, he was a multi-sport athlete in baseball, basketball and football, intending to try to pitch as a walk-on in college. After an injury, Akin abandoned those plans. On a mission trip to Sells, Arizona in 1977, Akin committed his life to full-time Christian ministry and decided to attend Criswell College in Dallas, Texas before attending seminary.

== Family ==
Akin married Charlotte Bourne on May 27, 1978, and together they have four sons: Nathan, Jonathan, Paul, and Timothy. All four sons are involved in pastoral ministry, several having lived and served overseas. Akin has 15 grandchildren.

== Education ==
Akin is a 1980 graduate of Criswell College with a B.A. in Biblical Studies and a 1983 graduate of Southwestern Baptist Theological Seminary with a Master of Divinity degree. He also earned a Doctor of Philosophy degree from the University of Texas at Arlington in 1989.

== Career in theological education ==
Akin's first teaching post was at Criswell College, where he taught New Testament, theology, and Church history from 1988 to 1992. He also served as the dean of students during that time. In 1992, after Paige Patterson became president of Southeastern Baptist Theological Seminary in Wake Forest, North Carolina, Akin joined the Southeastern faculty as associate professor of theology and dean of students. He then transitioned to the Southern Baptist Theological Seminary in Louisville, Kentucky. From 1996 to 2004 Akin served as theology professor, preaching professor, dean of the School of Theology, and Senior Vice President for Academic Administration. Akin then returned to Wake Forest as Southeastern Seminary's 6th president before retiring in 2026.

=== Presidency at Southeastern Baptist Theological Seminary ===
Akin's presidency of Southeastern Seminary and Judson College at Southeastern began in 2004. During his tenure, enrollment grew from 2,407 to over 3,600 students. In addition, under Akin's leadership Southeastern added multiple endowed professorship chairs.

Akin led Southeastern to establish the L. Russ Bush Center for Faith and Culture, which "seeks to bring the Christian faith to bear upon all areas of life through helping others to think and to act Christianly in both private and public discourse." Other initiatives that also began under Akin's leadership include the Lewis A. Drummond Center for Great Commission Studies (focuses on missions and church planting in North America and internationally), the Great Commission Equipping Network (Equip, focuses on providing theological education at a local church level), the Global Theological Initiative (GTI, focuses on using "the resources of Southeastern to benefit theological education through strategic partnerships around the world"), and Kingdom Diversity (seeking "to recruit and equip students from every corner of the Kingdom, to serve in every context of the Kingdom").

Akin has led Southeastern to produce yearly conferences aimed at equipping students and churches in various facets of theology and the Christian life. One recurring conference is the 20/20 Conference for area college students, which addresses central theological and apologetic aspects of the Christian life that college students are likely to encounter on university campuses.

== Emphasis on the Great Commission ==
Akin is well known for his emphasis on Jesus' Great Commission (Matthew 28:16-20) and the responsibility of churches and Christians to go to all the nations of the world and make disciples.

Frequently, international missions is the topic of Akin's sermons. In a series of chapel messages at Southeastern Seminary from 2007 to 2012, Akin preached a biblical text and illustrated it with the life story of a missionary. This series eventually made its way into publication as 10 Who Changed the World.

Akin began to call for a "Great Commission Resurgence" in his preaching at the November 2007 Building Bridges Conference held at Ridgecrest Conference Center in western North Carolina. However, it was Akin's April 2009 chapel sermon entitled "Axiom's for a Great Commission Resurgence" that fueled a widespread effort in the Southern Baptist Convention to build upon the "Conservative Resurgence" of the 1970s and 80s with a unifying effort to streamline SBC structures in order to more effectively fulfill Jesus' Great Commission. This effort culminated in the forming of a Great Commission Resurgence Task Force by then SBC president Johnny Hunt in 2009 and the adopting of the Task Force's report at the SBC annual meeting in 2010.

Akin has also regularly participated in international mission trips to various countries around the world.

== Preaching and teaching ==
Akin is widely regarded as a skilled preacher and teacher. He has co-authored and edited several books on preaching as well several journal articles focusing on Bible exposition. Akin's book Engaging Exposition, co-authored with Bill Curtis and Stephen Rummage, was named Book of the Year for "Enhancing the Preacher's Skill" by Preaching Today. He has also recorded curriculum for training of Bible study leaders and Sunday School teachers.

In 2019, Akin labelled prominent 20th century German theologians Karl Barth, Emil Brunner, Dietrich Bonhoeffer, Rudolf Bultmann, Paul Tillich, Adolf von Harnack and Friedrich Schleiermacher as theological enemies.

== Marriage and family conferences ==
Akin travels widely to do marriage and family conferences at churches around the country, in which he teaches on the roles of men and women in a marriage and gives practical and biblical advice for raising children. In addition, he has published several journal articles on the topics of marriage, intimacy, and gender roles.

== Quotes ==
"What you say is more important than how you say it, but how you say it has never been more important."
"God does not call everyone to leave home and go to the nations. I am convinced He is calling more than are going..."
"God does not call all to be international or North American missionaries. However, He does call all to be fully engaged in the work of missions. He calls all of us to be Great Commission Christians."
"We truly should pray not, 'Lord, should I go?' No, we should rather pray, 'Lord, why should I stay?'"

== Published works ==
- Christology: The Study of Christ (The Concise Theology Series), Daniel L. Akin (Rainer Publishing, 2013).
- Exalting Jesus in 1 & 2 Timothy and Titus (Christ-Centered Exposition Commentary), David Platt, Daniel L. Akin, and Tony Mérida (Nashville: B&H Academic, 2013) ISBN 978-0805495904.
- 10 Who Changed the World, Daniel L. Akin (Nashville: B&H Books, 2012) ISBN 978-1433673078.
- Engaging Exposition, Daniel L. Akin, Bill Curtis, and Stephen Rummage (Nashville: B&H Academic, 2011) ISBN 978-0805446685.
- "God's Plan for History: How to Read the Puzzling Book of Revelation." Decision (Vol. 50, No. 7-8, July–August 2009).
- Vibrant Church: Becoming a Healthy Church in the 21st Century, Daniel L. Akin and Thom Rainer (Nashville: LifeWay Press, 2008) ISBN 978-1415865415.
- A Theology for the Church, edited by Daniel L. Akin (Nashville: B&H Academic, 2007) ISBN 978-0805426403.
- "Divine Sovereignty and Human Responsibility: How Should Southern Baptists Respond to the Issue of Calvinism?" SBC Life (April 2006).
- Discovering the Biblical Jesus: Evidence From An Empty Tomb, Daniel L. Akin (Nashville: LifeWay, 2003) ISBN 978-0633087616.
- Ecclesiastes, Song of Songs (Holman Old Testament Commentary 14), Daniel L. Akin and David George Moore (Nashville: Holman Reference, 2003) ISBN 978-0805494822.
- God on Sex: The Creator's Ideas about Love, Intimacy, and Marriage, Daniel L. Akin (Nashville: B&H Books, 2003) ISBN 978-0805425963.
- "What Did Jesus Believe About the Bible?" Southern Baptist Journal of Theology (Vol. 5, No. 2, Summer 2001).
- 1, 2, 3 John (New American Commentary Series 38), Daniel L. Akin (Nashville: B&H Publishing, 2001) ISBN 978-0805401387.
- "The Never-Changing Christ for an Ever-Changing Culture." Southern Baptist Journal of Theology (Vol. 1, No. 1, Spring 1997).
- "The Soteriology of Bernard of Clairvaux." Criswell Theological Review (Vol. 4, No. 2, Spring 1990).
- "Triumphalism, Suffering, and Spiritual Maturity: An Exposition of II Corinthians 12:1-10 in Its Literacy, Theological, and Historical Context." Criswell Theological Review (Vol. 4, No. 1, Spring 1989).

== See also ==
- Southeastern Baptist Theological Seminary
- Judson College
- Southern Baptist Convention
