= Maria Bassett House =

Historic house in Massachusetts, United States

- U.S. National Register of Historic Places
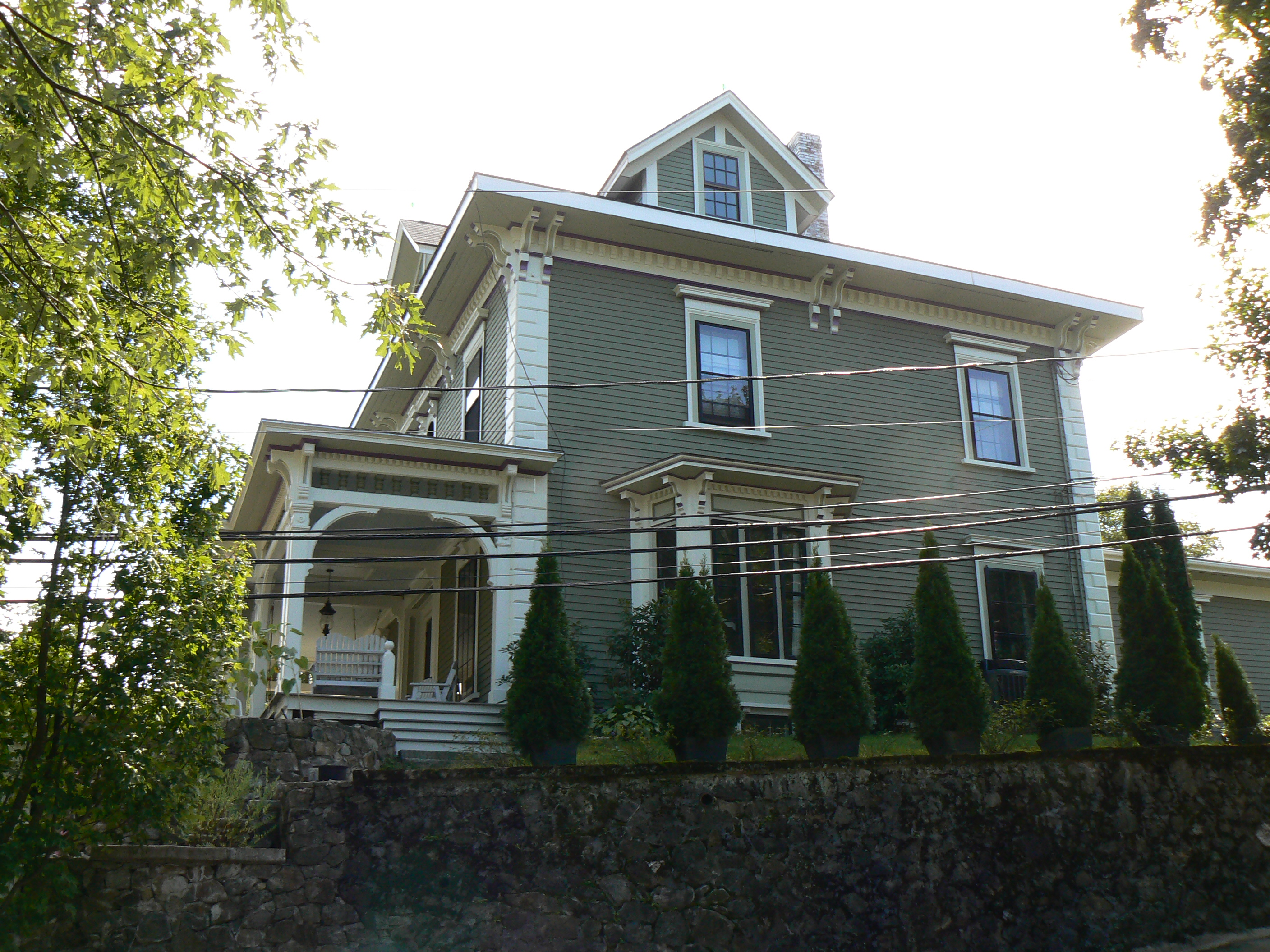
- Photo of the house, 2008

- Location within Massachusetts Location within the United States
- Location: 8 College Ave., Arlington, Massachusetts
- Coordinates: 42°25′40″N 71°9′14″W
- Area: less than one acre
- Built: c. 1850–70
- Architectural style: Italianate
- MPS: Arlington MRA
- NRHP reference No.: 85002681
- Added to NRHP: September 27, 1985

The Maria Bassett House is a historic house in Arlington, Massachusetts. Built c. 1850–70, it is one of the oldest houses in northwestern Arlington, and a particularly grand example of Italianate architecture. It was listed on the National Register of Historic Places in 1985.

== Description and history ==
The Maria Bassett House stands on a hillside overlooking the Lower Mystic Lake, at the southeast corner of College Avenue and Stowecroft Road and a short way above United States Route 3, from which it is separated by an intervening house. It is a 2 1/2-story wood-frame structure, with its front facade oriented to face roughly east, toward the lake. Its Italianate features include a hip roof with extended eaves, paired brackets and dentil moulding in the eaves, and corner boards scored to resemble quoins. The porch, which wraps around two sides, is also elaborately decorated, with brackets, dentil moulding, paired columns, and turned balusters. It probably once had a cupola, another high-style Italianate feature. A modern ell extends to the rear of the house.

Estimated to have been built between 1850 and 1870, it was one of the first to be built in the northwestern part of the town, most of which was not developed residentially until the 20th century. The rolling hills of the area were at the time primarily used for dairy farming.

== See also ==
- National Register of Historic Places listings in Arlington, Massachusetts
