= Africa International University =

Private university in Kenya

- AIU
- Motto: Education with Passion and Integrity
- Type: Christian Chartered Private University
- Established: 1983
- Chairman: Chair University Council - Dr. Nelson C. Kuria. OGW, MBS.
- Chairperson: Chair Board of Trustees - Dr. Esther Obasi-Ike.
- Chancellor: Professor Watson Omulokoli
- Vice-Chancellor: Professor Dankit Nassiuma
- Location: Karen, Nairobi, Nairobi, Kenya; 1.301763°S 36.689759°E
- Campus: Karen Main Campus
- Website: www.aiu.ac.ke

Africa International University is a Christian university in Karen, Nairobi, Kenya.

== History ==
Africa International University was founded in 1983 as the Nairobi Evangelical Graduate School of Theology (N.E.G.S.T) through the vision of the Association of Evangelicals in Africa. The goal was to provide training for pastors beyond the basic certificate and diploma levels.

In March 2011, A.I.U was awarded a university charter by the government of Kenya and has continued to develop undergraduate programs, particularly in business, ICT, Development Studies and Counselling Psychology.

== Programs ==
AIU offers pre-university, undergraduate, post-graduate, Masters and Ph.D programmes.

=== Undergraduate programs ===
- Bachelor of Arts in Psychology and Counselling (4 years or 2 years with credit transfer from relevant Diploma)
- Bachelor of Business Administration (4 years or 2 years with credit transfer from relevant Diploma)
- Bachelor of Theology (Th.B.) (4 years or 2 years for Theology Diploma holders)
- Bachelor of Education

Early Childhood Development

  - Primary education
  - Secondary education
- Bachelor of Arts in Development Studies (4 years)
  - Sustainable Community Development

Urban Development

- Bachelor of Science in Entrepreneurship (4 years)
- Bachelor of Science in Accountancy and Financial Management (4 years)
- Bachelor of Science in Information Communication Technology (4 years)
- Management Information System
- Software Development
- Computer Network

=== Masters programs ===
Master of Theology (Th.M.) (2 years)

  - Th.M. in Biblical Studies(2 years)
  - Th.M. in Mission Studies(2 years)
  - Th.M. in World Christianity (2 years)

Master of Divinity (M.Div.) (3 years full-time)

  - M.Div. in Biblical Studies
  - M.Div. in Church Education
  - M.Div. in Church History
  - M.Div. General
  - M.Div. in Mission Studies
  - M.Div. in Pastoral Studies
  - M.Div. in Theological Studies
  - M.Div. in Translation Studies

Master of Arts (2 years full-time, 3 years part-time)

- MA in Biblical Studies
- MA in Church History
- MA in Translation Studies
- MA in Missions
- General
- Islamic Emphasis
- MA in Organizational Leadership
- MA in Pastoral Studies
- MA in Theology
- Master of Education
- Child Development and Family Studies
- Church Education
- Curriculum & Instruction
- Educational Leadership & Administration

=== Doctoral programs ===
- Ph.D. in Education (4 years)
- Curriculum & Instruction
- Church Education
- Educational Leadership & Administration
- Child Development & Family Studies
- Ph.D. in Translation Studies
- Ph.D. in InterReligious Studies
- Ph.D. in Practical Theology (Coming soon)
- Ph.D. in Theological Studies (4 years)
- Biblical Studies
- World Christianity
- Missions studies
- Theology & Development
- Theology & Culture
- Systematic Theology

Doctor of Ministry (D.Min.) (3 years)
