= Bassett Lodge and Range Cafe =

- U.S. National Register of Historic Places
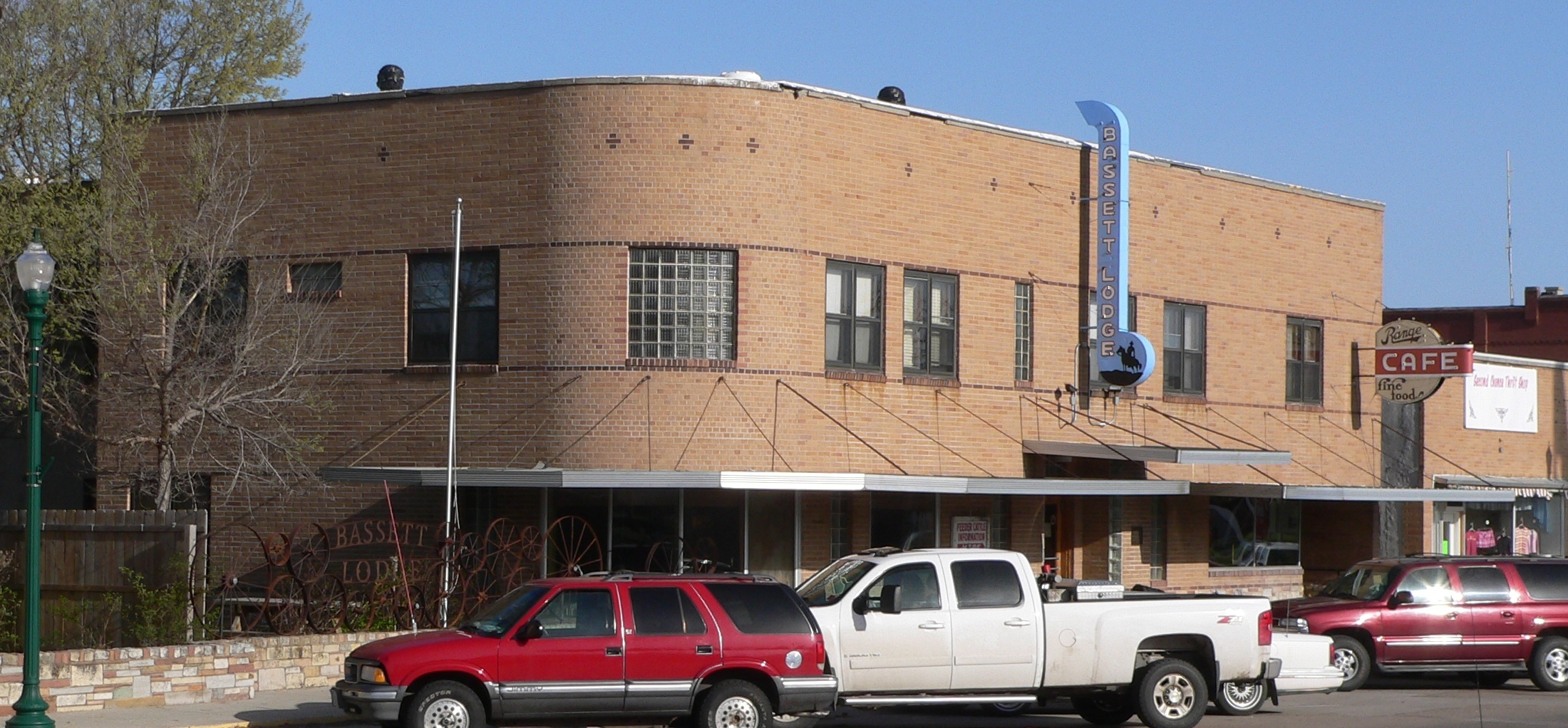

- Location within Nebraska Location within the United States
- Location: 205 Clark, Bassett, Nebraska
- Coordinates: 42°35′7″N 99°32′16″W
- Area: less than one acre
- Built: 1949
- Architect: Thomas J. Galleher
- Architectural style: Moderne
- NRHP reference No.: 06000640
- Added to NRHP: July 26, 2006

The Bassett Lodge and Range Cafe, located at 205 Clark in Bassett, Nebraska, USA, was built during 1949–51. It was designed by local architect and lumberyard owner Thomas J. Galleher in Moderne style. It is designated Nebraska historic resource RO01-041 and was listed on the National Register of Historic Places in 2006.

It was deemed significant for its association with business in Bassett and for its architecture. It was built as a hotel and cafe to serve cattle buyers at the Bassett Livestock Auction, which attracted buyers nationwide. It was built around a 1925-26-built hotel building; the 1949-51 construction added Streamline Moderne lines. As of the date of NRHP nomination, the building was very well preserved.

It continues to serve as a motel and restaurant.
