= Williamsport and North Branch Railroad =

The Williamsport and North Branch Railroad was a short line that operated in north-central Pennsylvania between 1872 and 1937. After a long struggle to finance its construction, it was completed in 1893. It derived most of its freight revenue from logging and to a certain extent from anthracite coal traffic. It also carried many passengers to mountain resorts in Sullivan County, Pennsylvania. With the decline of the logging industry and increased accessibility of the region by automobile in the 1910s and 1920s, the railroad's business rapidly declined. The economic blow of the Great Depression proved insurmountable, and it was abandoned as unprofitable in 1937.

== Muncy Creek Railway ==
Muncy Creek Railway
Overview
- Headquarters: Hughesville, Pennsylvania
- Locale: Lycoming County, Pennsylvania
- Dates of operation: 1872–1882
- Successor: Williamsport and North Branch Railroad

Technical
- Track gauge: 4 ft 8 1/2 in (1,435 mm) standard gauge

The railroad was originally chartered as the Muncy Creek Railway on May 21, 1864. It was intended to provide a railroad outlet for Laporte, the newly established county seat of Sullivan County, via the valley of Muncy Creek. Some surveying, and possibly even grading, was done, but the new corporation ran out of money around 1867 and remained quiescent for several years. Interest in the railroad did not resume until 1871, when the Catawissa Railroad, later part of the Reading system, completed its line up the east bank of the West Branch Susquehanna River, passing through Muncy and Halls. Muncy, near the mouth of Muncy Creek, was an established town and would have been the logical terminus of the railroad. However, residents of Muncy feared the railroad would compete with an existing plank road to Hughesville and refused it permission to enter the town. Accordingly, the railroad was built from Halls to Hughesville in 1872, but money for further work was again lacking. The railroad was extended to Picture Rocks in 1875 using wooden rails to save money. However, the wooden rails could not withstand the weight of trains and the extension was abandoned in early 1876. The Muncy Creek Railway continued to struggle along until 1881, when the bondholders petitioned to have it placed in receivership. It was foreclosed on August 9, 1882, and reorganized on September 1, 1882 as the Williamsport and North Branch Railroad.

== Completion ==
Williamsport and North Branch Railroad
Overview
- Headquarters: Hughesville, Pennsylvania
- Locale: Pennsylvania
- Dates of operation: 1882–1922
- Successor: Williamsport and North Branch Railway

Technical
- Track gauge: 4 ft 8 1/2 in (1,435 mm) standard gauge

The new owners still intended to extend the railroad towards Laporte and the coalfield at Bernice, but this could only be accomplished in slow stages. The track from Halls to Hughesville was rebuilt to make up for the deferred maintenance of previous years, and in late 1883, construction north and east began again. The new line followed a different route from the unsuccessful wooden-railed extension, following the west side of Muncy Creek through Tivoli up to Glen Mawr, which was reached in 1884. There was a picnic grove at Tivoli which was the destination of summer excursions, and a stage connection to the resort of Eagles Mere, then called Lewis Lake.

Extension of the line continued. At Glen Mawr, the railroad crossed Muncy Creek and followed its east bank up to Sonestown, which it reached in 1885, and Nordmont, where it ended in October 1886. Here the railroad's expansion ceased again, but the sawmills and tanneries of the Muncy Valley provided the revenue to keep it solvent.

In the late 1880s, the Pennsylvania Railroad took an interest in the W&NB as a means of reaching the Bernice coalfields. The State Line and Sullivan Railroad, a subsidiary of the Lehigh Valley, had already reached the area, and the Bloomsburg and Sullivan Railroad, backed by the Reading interest, had been chartered in 1883 to reach Bernice from the south via Fishing Creek. The PRR backed a new syndicate which took over the W&NB in 1888, and named George Sanderson president. However, the PRR's interest in the W&NB quickly waned, especially after the Bloomsburg & Sullivan's construction halted in Jamison City, never to reach Bernice. The failure of Sanderson's bank in 1891 resulted in the transfer of his investment in the W&NB to his creditors, including John Satterfield; Satterfield now became vice-president and Henry C. McCormick president of the railroad. Satterfield was determined to complete the railroad, and after raising money and surveying, construction began in 1892. At Nordmont, the railroad crossed Muncy Creek on a horseshoe curve and began climbing up the other side of the valley, then turning up Deep Hollow and crossing over into the Loyalsock Creek watershed. The new line passed Lake Mokoma and Laporte and descended high on the east side of the Mill Creek valley, turning and descending along the Loyalsock to Ringdale. The line from Ringdale to the summit between Loyalsock and Muncy creeks was built on a 1% grade to facilitate handling heavy coal trains from Bernice. At Ringdale, the line crossed the Loyalsock on a high trestle, 476 feet (145 m) long, and ran up Birch Creek. The line forked at Birch Creek Junction, with one branch going up a tributary of Birch Creek to a junction with the State Line & Sullivan at Dohm's Summit, while another followed Birch Creek to join the State Line and Sullivan at Bernice.

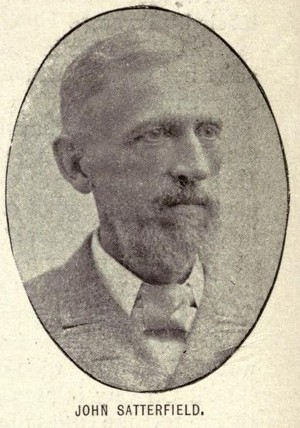
John Satterfield, vice-president of the W&NB

The line was completed into Laporte in August 1893, and to Dohm's Summit in September. The latter was renamed Satterfield in honor of the promoter who had completed the W&NB. Construction of a depot at Satterfield began in October, but a dispute with the Lehigh Valley over property ownership resulted in its demolition, and it was relocated in November. The W&NB did obtain trackage rights over the State Line & Sullivan to Towanda for its passenger trains. The branch to Bernice was finished in 1894.

== Business of the railroad ==
The finished W&NB enjoyed considerable business, both passenger and freight. Along the southern portion of the line, three furniture factories operated in the lower Muncy Valley. Above Picture Rocks was the Lyon sawmill, the largest sawmill on Muncy Creek. Logs were floated down the creek to the mill, and it shipped finished lumber over the railroad. Smaller sawmills were common along the line north of Picture Rocks. Tanneries at Muncy Valley and Laporte came under the control of the Union Tanning Company (a subsidiary of the United States Leather Company) in 1893, using hemlock bark supplied by logging. In the late 1890s, a chemical company was built at Nordmont which made charcoal, acetic acid, and wood alcohol from wood. Attempts to develop Lake Mokoma for ice harvesting were largely unsuccessful. Finally, anthracite coal mined around Bernice supplied some of the railroad's freight traffic.

Passenger service was also important to the railroad's revenue. Several hotels around Highland Lake were connected by stage to the railroad's station at Chamouni (later renamed Essick and Tivoli). The opening of the narrow gauge Eagles Mere Railroad on July 1, 1892 provided additional passenger traffic. The narrow gauge interchanged with the W&NB at Sonestown, providing passenger service to the many hotels at the resort of Eagles Mere.

== Prosperity ==
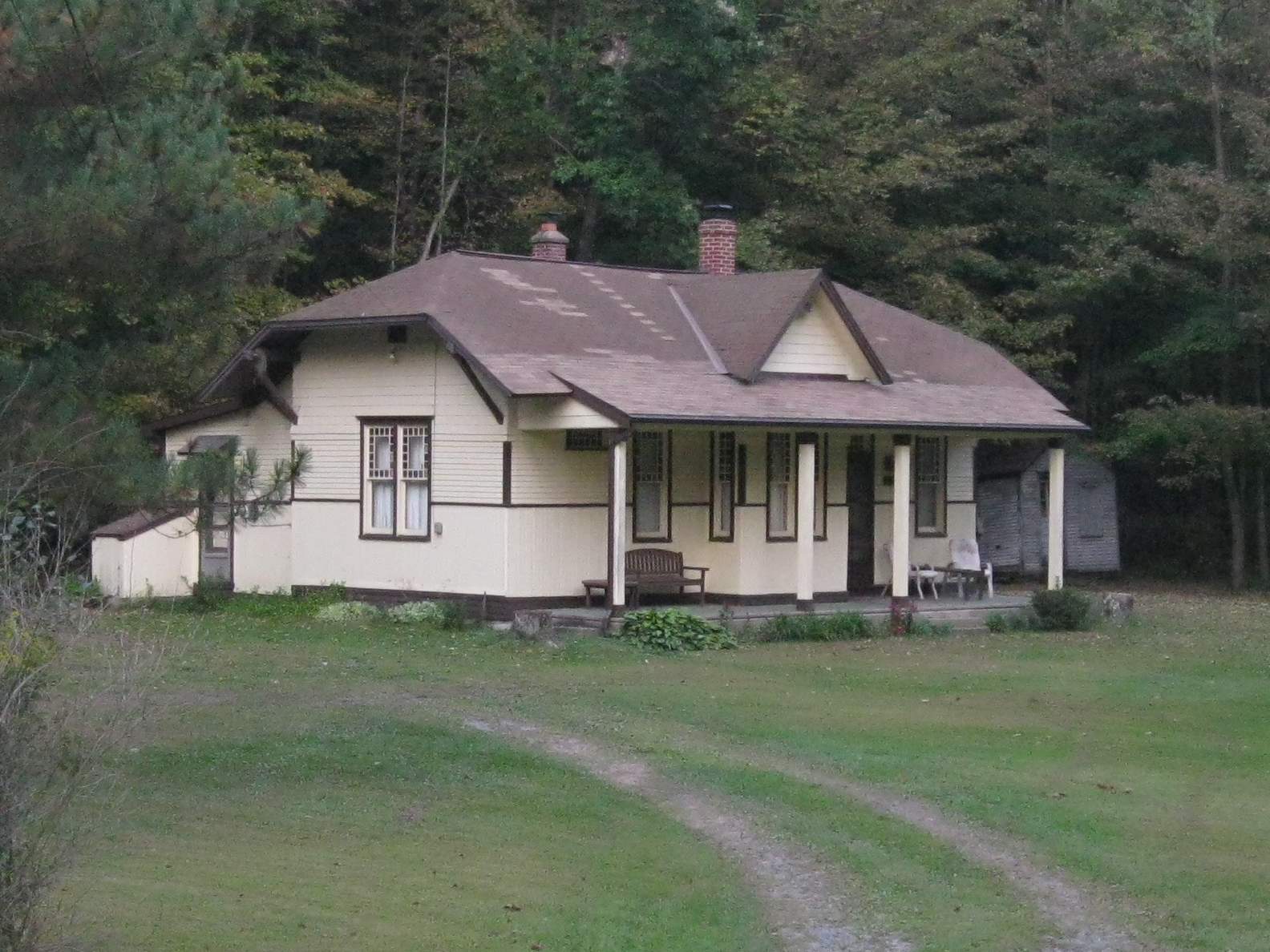
The station at Sonestown. The W&NB once served a clothespin factory and a stave mill here.

Extension to the coal fields did not result in immediate prosperity. Despite an increase in traffic, the additional cost of extending the railroad resulted in interest charges that dragged the railroad down. McCormick resigned as president in 1896, and an economic downturn in 1897 brought the railroad into insolvency. The owners decided to sell out to a group of New York financiers and local businesspeople, and B. Harvey Welch, a native of Hughesville, became president. This transaction eliminated the bond interest and put the railroad back on a reasonably sound financial footing.

After 1900, a lime-burning business began to develop on the south end of the line, using local limestone deposits and coal shipped south from Bernice. In 1901, the Eagles Mere Railroad was leased to the W&NB for $5,000 a year. This proved to be a fortunate decision, for in that same year, Union Tanning decided to log large tracts of forest to the north and west of the line. Charles W. Sones contracted to do the logging, and built a sawmill at Kettle Creek, and a logging railroad to connect it with Eagles Mere. The lumber was shipped down the Eagles Mere Railroad to Sonestown and then over the W&NB; a narrow gauge rail was laid from Sonestown to Muncy Valley to allow Eagles Mere trains to haul bark directly to the tannery there. About this time, the Northern Anthracite Company built its Murray coal breaker two miles west of Bernice. The W&NB was given exclusive rights to serve it, operating via trackage rights over the Lehigh Valley to a new spur to the mine. At 169 feet (52 m) high, the breaker was the tallest structure in central Pennsylvania. When the Coal Strike of 1902 paralyzed many of the mines on the Reading, Northern Anthracite experienced a boom in business, and for a short while, the W&NB was shipping a thousand tons of coal per day to Halls for interchange with the Reading.

The rosy prospects of coal traffic proved illusory, however. After the strike ended, coal traffic rapidly fell off. A further blow occurred in 1906, when Sones' logging railroad (incorporated in 1904 as the Susquehanna and Eagles Mere Railroad) was extended to Masten and a connection with the Susquehanna and New York Railroad, owned by Union Tanning. The Laporte tannery closed about this time, and Sones' lumber traffic was diverted to move through Masten rather than Sonestown. The closing of the Muncy Valley Tannery in 1908 effectively removed Union Tanning's traffic from the railroad. However, wood products traffic was still generated at Nordmont. Sutton Peck Chemical had built a standard gauge logging railroad up Cherry Run and down Painter Run in 1900. Sutton Peck became Nordmont Chemical in 1904, and in 1908, it removed the Cherry Run–Painter Run line. A new line was incorporated by the chemical company as the Wyoming and Sullivan Railroad, and built several miles up Muncy Creek to continue supplying wood to Nordmont Chemical.

== Decline and abandonment ==
Williamsport and North Branch Railway
Overview
- Headquarters: Hughesville, Pennsylvania
- Locale: Pennsylvania
- Dates of operation: 1922–1937
- Successor: abandoned

Technical
- Track gauge: 4 ft 8 1/2 in (1,435 mm) standard gauge

The W&NB's most profitable year was in 1906, when it netted $15,000. Thereafter, it fluctuated between surplus and deficit until 1912, the last year it showed a profit. Most local industries, such as logging, tanning and agriculture, declined through the 1910s, with only coal shipments remaining dependable. The only significant industrial development was the opening of the Big Run Manufacturing Company's stave mill at Sonestown in 1914. Big Run Manufacturing was a project of local loggers, including Col. R. Bruce Ricketts. The company laid a standard gauge rail a short distance on the Eagles Mere Railroad, and then turned up Big Run to collect timber. This line was removed around 1917 or 1918, and a new line was laid on part of the old Nordmont Chemical grade from Nordmont up Cherry Run. Logging trains originating on this line operated over the W&NB from Nordmont to Sonestown until 1922, when the stave mill was closed and its logging line abandoned.

The W&NB went into receivership in 1917 due to its inability to pay off its bonded interest, and the lease of the Eagles Mere Railroad was canceled in 1920. The W&NB was reorganized as the Williamsport and North Branch Railway on May 1, 1921. In addition to the closing of the Sonestown stave mill, Nordmont Chemical sold out to Charles Sones in 1924. He closed the factory, replaced it with a sawmill, and continued to haul logs on the Wyoming & Sullivan until 1930. With local traffic falling off, the W&NB depended on the small amount of bridge traffic allotted it by the ICC to help sustain it. It was only allowed freight traveling over the Grand Trunk Railway and the Lehigh Valley which was destined for the Reading. In practice, this amounted largely to automobiles and grain.

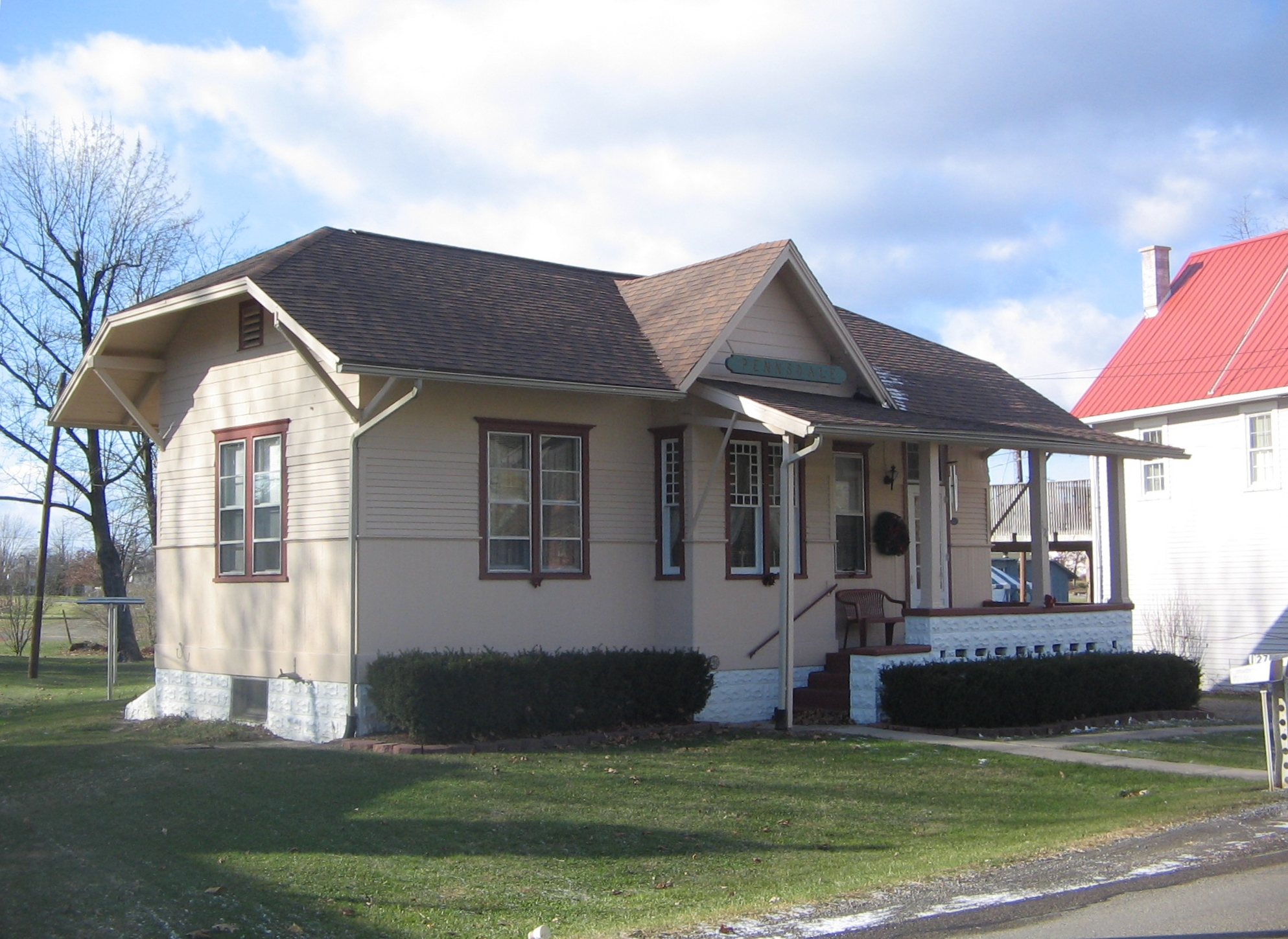
Pennsdale, one of three remaining stations from the railroad.

It was the Great Depression that ultimately finished off the Williamsport and North Branch. The Eagles Mere Railroad had been abandoned in 1926 after flood damage, but it no longer supplied any significant traffic for the W&NB. After 1930, the logging and wood products industry had essentially shut down, leaving only the coal mines as regular generators of freight traffic north of Picture Rocks. The furniture factories lower in the valley also suffered during the Depression. During the 1930s, the railroad just scraped along, able to pay its operating expenses but unable to maintain track or equipment. By 1937, it was in so decrepit a state that the owners decided to abandon it. The last train ran on October 11, 1937, and tracks were removed by summer 1938.

Little remains of the railroad, although the Pennsdale and Sonestown stations are now private residences, the Nordmont station stands vacant, and part of the grade has been incorporated into the Loyalsock Trail.
