= Bernice =

Bernice may refer to:

== Places ==
=== In the United States ===
- Bernice, Arkansas, an unincorporated community
- Bernice, Louisiana, a town
- Bernice, Nevada, a ghost town
- Bernice, Oklahoma, a town
- Bernice Coalfield, a coalfield in Sullivan County, Pennsylvania

=== Elsewhere ===
- Bernice, Manitoba, Canada, a community
- Bernice, an Old English name for Bernicia, an Anglo-Saxon kingdom in the 6th and 7th centuries

== Other uses ==
- Bernice (given name), including a list of people and characters with the name
- Hurricane Bernice (disambiguation), tropical cyclones in the eastern Pacific Ocean
- USS Mary Alice (SP-397), a patrol vessel originally a private steam yacht named Bernice

== See also ==
- Berenice (disambiguation)
