= Bernice (given name) =

- Gender: usually female

Other names
- Related names: Berenice, Bernie, Veronica

Bernice is a given name.

== People ==
Some notable individuals with the name include:

- Bernice Pauahi Bishop (1831–1884), a Hawaiian princess
- Bernice Bonello, Maltese politician
- Bernice Coppieters (born 1970), Belgian ballet dancer
- Bernice Gera (1931–1992), the first female umpire in professional baseball
- Bernice Goodman (1927–2003), American social worker, gay rights activist
- Bernice Gottlieb (born 1931), early leader in the trans-racial adoption movement
- Bernice Kentner (1929–2018), American cosmetologist and author
- Bernice King (born 1963), Baptist minister and daughter of Dr. Martin Luther King
- Bernice Brown McCullar (1904–1975), American writer and educator
- Bernice Mosby (born 1984), American basketball player
- Bernice Neugarten (1916–2001), professor and researcher in the field of aging
- Bernice Petkere (1901–2000), American songwriter dubbed the "Queen of Tin Pan Alley" by Irving Berlin
- Bernice Rubens (1928–2004), Booker Prize-winning Welsh novelist
- Bernice F. Sisk (1910–1995), American Democratic Congressman from California
- Bernice Carr Vukovich (born 1938), South African tennis player
- Bernice Wilson (born 1984), British track and field athlete

== Fictional characters ==
- Bernice Blackstock, from the British soap opera Emmerdale
- Bernice Hibbert, a recurring character on The Simpsons TV show
- Bernice Summerfield, a companion of the seventh Dr. Who in novels
- Bernice Waverley, in the Australian TV drama series City Homicide

== See also ==
- Bernice (disambiguation)
