= Saint Veronica (disambiguation) =

Saint Veronica is a Christian saint who is believed to have encountered Jesus on the way to his crucifixion.

Saint Veronica can also refer to:

- Veronica Giuliani, an Italian saint
- Saint Veronika, a Billy Talent song
- Febronia of Syria, a Syrian saint

== See also ==
- Veronica (disambiguation)
- Berenice (disambiguation)
