= Neeco Delaf =

French music producer and songwriter

Neeco Delaf is a French music producer and songwriter. Delaf produces mainly downtempo, chillout electronic music. In 2016 his song "Anthropology" was compiled in Café del Mar's album "Café del Mar, Vol. 22". In 2017, he collaborated with Flora Cash on the track "If You Let Me".

== Discography ==
=== EP/singles ===
- 2017: In The Night EP
  1. Banque
  2. If You Let Me (feat. Flora Cash)
  3. Fakir
  4. In The Night
- 2016: Hounded (feat. Andrew Montgomery)
- 2015: Anthropology
- 2015: Paradise (feat. Fly Nicole)
- 2015: Edda Magnason - Cocoamber (Neeco Delaf remix)
- 2013: Relax
