= Vernice (name) =

Vernice is a feminine name.

== List of people with the name ==
- Barbara Vernice Siggers Franklin, mother of Aretha Franklin
- Vernice Armour, first African-American female naval aviator in the Marine Corps
- Vernice Bellony, Dominican politician and teacher
- Vernice Simms, individual in the Tulsa race massacre

== See also ==
- Venice
- Bernice (given name)
- Denice (given name)
