= Benny =

- Pronunciation: /ˈbɛni/
- Gender: Male (Benjamin, Benedict, Bennett, Bernard, Ebenezer, etc.); Female (Bernice or Bernadette)

Other names
- Related names: Benjamin, Bernice, Bernadette, Bernard

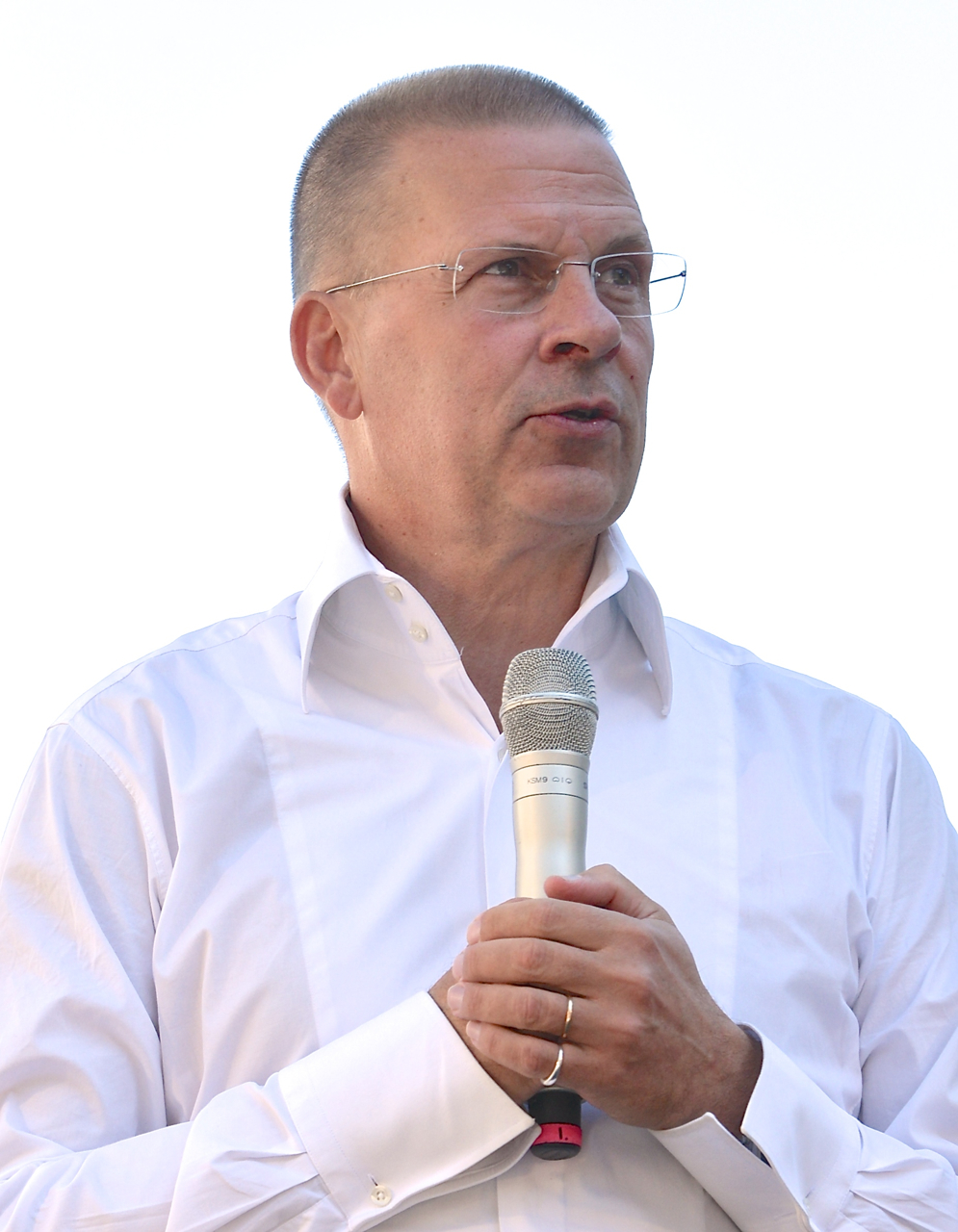
Benny Fredriksson

Benny or Bennie is a given name or a shortened version of the given name Benjamin or, less commonly, Benedict, Bennett, Benito, Benson, Bernice, Ebenezer, Benansio/Benancio or Bernard.

== People ==
=== Bennie ===
==== Given name ====
- Bennie M. Bunn (1907–1943), American Marine officer, Navy Cross recipient
- Bennie Cunningham (1954–2018), American retired National Football League player
- Bennie Daniels (born 1932), American former Major League Baseball pitcher
- Bennie L. Davis (1928–2012), United States Air Force general and commander-in-chief of Strategic Air Command
- Bennie Ellender (1925–2011), American college football player and head coach
- Bennie Goods (born 1968), American retired Canadian Football League player
- Bennie Green (1923–1977), American jazz trombonist and bandleader
- Bennie Logan (born 1989), American National Football League player
- Bennie Maupin (born 1940), American jazz musician
- Bennie Muller (1938–2024), Dutch former footballer
- Bennie Purcell (1929–2016), American college basketball and Washington Generals (Harlem Globetrotters) player and college tennis coach
- Bennie Thompson (born 1948), American politician
- Bennie Thompson (American football) (born 1963), American retired National Football League player
- Bennie Wallace (born 1946), American post bop, swing music and jazz tenor saxophonist and composer

==== Surname ====
- Bob Bennie (footballer, born 1873) (1873–1945), Scottish footballer with St Mirren and Newcastle (uncle of two following)
- Peter Bennie (1899–1981), Scottish footballer with Albion Rovers, Burnley, Bradford City
- Bob Bennie (1900–1972), Scottish footballer with Third Lanark, Airdrieonians, Hearts

- Bennie Railplane, invented by George Bennie

=== Benny ===
- Göran Bror Benny Andersson (born 1946), Swedish musician and member of the pop group ABBA
- Benny Binion (1904–1989), American gambling icon and criminal
- Benny Chan (actor) (born 1969), Hong Kong actor and singer
- Benny Davis (1895–1979), American vaudeville performer
- Benny Dayal (born 1984), UAE-Indian playback singer for films
- Benny Feilhaber (born 1985), Brazilian-American soccer player
- Benny Friedman (singer) (born 1985), American Hasidic Jewish singer
- Benny Gantz (born 1959), Israeli Chief of the General Staff and politician
- Benny Giay (born 1955), Indonesian Christian theologian, social anthropologist and human rights activist
- Benny Goldberg (1918–2001), Polish-American boxer
- Benny Havens (1787–1877), American tavernkeeper
- Benny Hill (1924–1992), stage name of British comedian and actor Alfred Hawthorne Hill
- Benny Jamz (born 1993), Danish rapper
- Benny Johnson (American football) (1948–1988), American National Football League player
- Benny Krueger (1899–1967), American jazz saxophonist
- Benny Lindelauf (born 1964), Dutch writer
- Benny Moré (1919–1963), Cuban singer and musician
- Benny Nielsen (swimmer) (born 1966), Danish butterfly swimmer
- Benny Rubinstein (born 1952), Israeli footballer
- Benny Cederfeld de Simonsen (1865–1952), Danish peace activist
- Benny Safdie (born 1986), American filmmaker and actor
- Benny Sapp III (born 2000), American football player
- Benny Snell (born 1998), American football player
- Benny Spellman (1931–2011), American R&B singer
- Benny Urquidez (born 1952), American kickboxer and fight choreographer
- Benny Yau (born 1980), Canadian actor and television presenter

=== Benjamin ===
- Bennie McRae (1939–2012), American National Football League player
- Bennie Moten (1894–1935), American jazz pianist and bandleader
- Bennie Oosterbaan (1906–1990), American college football, basketball and baseball player and head coach
- Benny Bass (1904–1975), American Hall-of-Fame world champion featherweight and junior lightweight boxer
- Benny Begin (born 1943), Israeli politician
- Benny Friedman (1905–1982), American football quarterback, member of the Pro Football Hall-of-Fame
- Benny Goodman (1909–1986), American jazz clarinetist and bandleader
- Benny Leonard (1896–1947), American world champion Hall-of-Fame lightweight boxer born Benjamin Leiner
- Benny Parsons (1941–2007), American NASCAR driver and color commentator

=== Other ===
- Horacio Benedict Bennie Blades (born 1966), American retired National Football League player
- Bernhard Bennie Borgmann (1900–1978), pioneering professional basketball player and head coach
- Henry Bennett Bennie Tate (1901–1973), American Major League Baseball catcher
- Bennett Benny Carter (1907–2003), American jazz musician and bandleader
- Bernard Benny Gallagher (born 1945), Scottish singer-songwriter and half of the duo Gallagher and Lyle
- Jergen Benny Nielsen (footballer, born 17 March 1951) (born 1951), Danish footballer

== Fictional characters ==
- Benny Fazio, a character on The Sopranos
- Bennie, titular character in the 1973 Elton John song Bennie and the Jets
- Benny, a character in the post-apocalyptic short story I Have No Mouth, and I Must Scream
- Benny Rabbit, a character in the children's television series Sesame Street
- Benny the Bull, in the children's animated television series Dora the Explorer
- Benny the Cab, who first appeared in Who Framed Roger Rabbit
- Benny Shaw, protagonist in two children's novels by Irish author Eoin Colfer
- Bernice Summerfield, companion of the Seventh Doctor in the expanded Doctor Who universe
- Benny, a blue 1980s-style spaceman from The Lego Movie
- Benny, the secondary antagonist of Fallout: New Vegas
- Benny Hawkins, character in British TV soap series Crossroads, played by Paul Henry
- Benny the Ball, character in the animated television series Top Cat
- Benny "The Jet" Rodriguez in The Sandlot

== See also ==
- Beny (disambiguation)
