= Somebody Else =

Somebody Else may refer to:

- "Somebody Else" (Big Country song), 1999
- "Somebody Else" (Mario song), 2013
- "Somebody Else" (The 1975 song), 2016
- "Somebody Else", a 1997 song by Hurricane G
- Somebody Else, a 2003 novel by Reggie Nadelson

== See also ==
- "You're Somebody Else", a 2017 song by Flora Cash
- Someone Else (disambiguation)
