= Beny =

Beny or Bény may refer to:

== Given name ==
- Beny Alagem (born 1953), Israeli-American businessman
- Beny Parnes (born 1959), Brazilian economist
- Beny Primm (1928–2015), American physician and HIV/AIDS researcher
- Beny Steinmetz (born 1956), Israeli businessman
- Beny Tchaicovsky (1954–2009), painter and musician
- Beny Wahyudi (born 1986), Indonesian footballer

== Surname ==
- Pierre-Yves Bény (born 1983), French gymnast
- Roloff Beny (1924–1984), Canadian photographer
- Yoewanto Setya Beny (born 1993), Indonesian footballer

== Other uses ==
- Bény, a commune in the Ain department in eastern France
- Bény-sur-Mer, a commune in the Calvados department in northwestern France

== See also ==
- Benny, given name
