= Berenice (disambiguation) =

Berenice is a feminine name.

Berenice may also refer to:

== Places ==
- Berenice in Cyrenaica, Greek name of Hellenistic predecessor of modern-day Benghazi in Libya; still a Catholic titular episcopal see
- Berenike (Epirus), ancient Greek city in Epirus
- Berenice Troglodytica, also known as Berenike, modern Medinet-el Haras, ancient Egyptian port city, archeological site
- Berenice Panchrysos, ancient Egyptian port city near Sabae
- Berenice Epideires, near the mouth of the Red Sea, in modern Djibouti
- Mount Berenice in Galilee, overlooking ancient Tiberias, in modern Israel

== Arts and entertainment ==
- Berenice, an Italian opera by George Frideric Händel
- "Berenice" (short story), by Edgar Allan Poe
- Berenice (play), 1670 French tragedy by Jean Racine
- Bérénice, a French opera by Albéric Magnard after Racine's tragedy

== Other uses ==
- Coma Berenices, a constellation in the northern hemisphere
- 653 Berenike, an asteroid
- Berenice (plant), a plant belonging to the family Campanulaceae
- Berenice (rocket), a series of French experimental rockets
- S.S. Berenice, sunk in the Bay of Biscay in the early morning of 21 June 1940

== See also ==
- Bernice (disambiguation)
