= Matching colors =

Matching colors or (in British English) colours usually refers to complementary colors, pairs or triplets of colors that harmonize well together.

Matching colors may also refer to:

- Color management, the matching of color representations across various electronic devices.
- Color analysis (art)
