= Carole Jackson =

Color consultant

- Born: 1942 (age 83–84)

Carole Jackson (born 1942) is a former color consultant who developed seasonal color analysis, a system of advising which colors a person should wear to look their most attractive based on their skin tone.

== Color Me Beautiful ==
=== 1970s ===
Jackson developed the system in the 1970s after studying color theory. In 1980 she wrote Color Me Beautiful, which became a bestseller in the early 1980s. By 1983 it was in its 31st printing; as of 2014 the book was still in print. Jackson's system was based on the work of Johannes Itten, Belle Northrup, and Harriet Tilden McJimsey.

She created a consulting business to advise people which colors to wear in Bedford, New York, then moved it to McLean, Virginia, and licensed the system to other consultants. The concept became popular; it was not uncommon for people to ask one another, "Have you had your colors done?" GQ likened knowing what 'your color' was in the 1980s to knowing your astrological sign. According to the Washington Post, in 1982 the company grossed $2.5M.

The color analysis system divides people into four seasonal groups based on their skin tones, with each group advised to wear a certain palette of colors. Winters and summers were those with skin undertones of blue, while springs and autumns had undertones of yellow. Winters are advised to wear rich saturated colors such as black, white, true red, fuchsia, and cobalt blue. Autumns are advised to wear brown, burnt orange, olive green, deep teal and maroon. Summers are advised to wear dusty rose, grey, cornflower blue, lavender and taupe. Springs are advised to wear coral, bright teal, gold, camel and lime green. Jackson described herself as a winter. Jackson further split people into style personalities, a concept from McJimsey's work, giving advice on dressing to enhance body type and facial shape.

=== 2020s ===
The concept of color analysis received new attention in the early 2020s, becoming a viral phenomenon on TikTok.

== Reception ==
GQ in 2023 called Color Me Beautiful "seminal".

Criticism of Jackson's work in the 80s included arguments that "Any woman can wear black". Criticism in the 2020s includes that the book uses dated language surrounding gender and that the original book focussed mostly on white people and assigned all people of color to the winter category.

== Personal life ==
Jackson is the daughter of Jean Elizabeth Halliburton, a journalist, and Arnold Stevens.
