= Bernice Kentner =

Writer and color theorist (b. 1929, d. 2018)

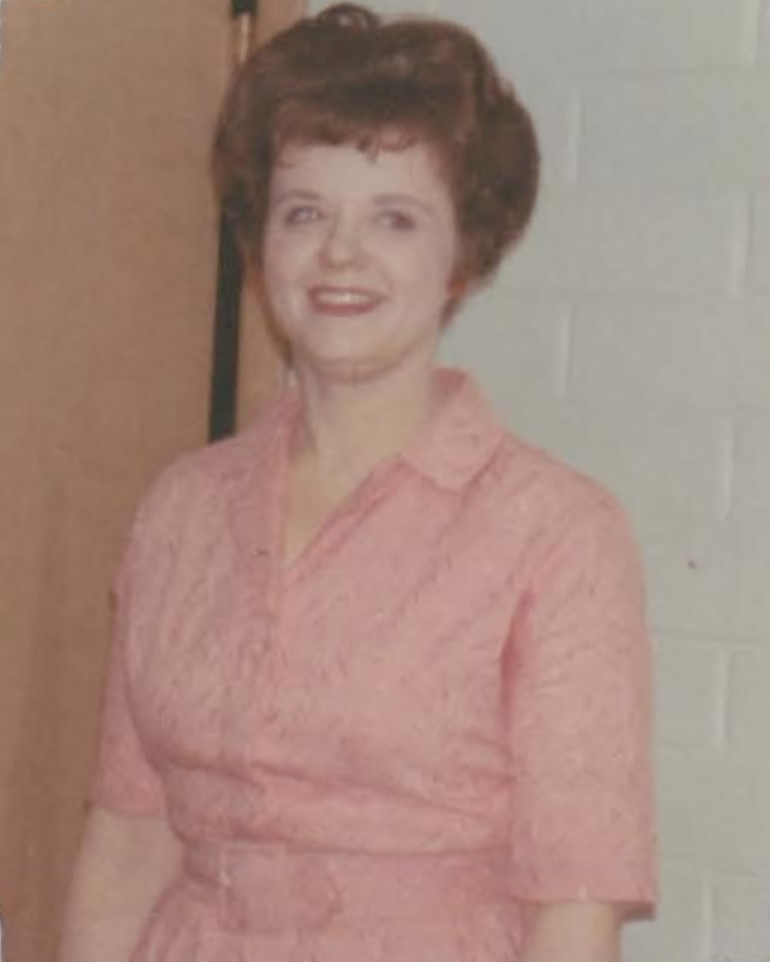
- Bernice Kentner in the 1960s
- Born: Wilma Bernice Tufford; May 23, 1929; Cheyenne, Wyoming
- Died: January 2, 2018 (aged 88); Ogden, Utah
- Spouse: Dean George Kentner
- Writing career
- Notable work: Color Me A Season

Bernice Kentner (1929–2018) was an American cosmetologist, color theorist, and author.

== Background ==
Bernice Kentner was born in Cheyenne, Wyoming and later moved to North Platte, Nebraska. In the 1980s, Kentner relocated to Concord, California.

Bernice Kentner was a leading proponent of seasonal color analysis in the 1970s and 1980s. By the 1990s, Jo Peddicord still considered Kentner's philosophy of color to be one of the most prominent color analysis systems in the United States, and Peddicord acknowledged that Kentner had an international following. In 2003, The Register-Guard stated that Kentner's book Color Me a Season "helped spur the 1980s boom in color analysis." In the 2010s, some authors argued that Kentner's system had become outdated, such as June McLeod, who wrote in 2016 that "today there are few people in the colour world who still follow her work by using the four season system."

== Seasonal color analysis ==
The color analysis system developed by Bernice Kentner differs from the other notable system that Carole Jackson developed in the 1980 publication Color Me Beautiful; Kentner's system focuses more specifically on skin color, while hair color is considered secondary.

In the book Going Gray, Anne Kreamer dedicates an entire chapter to apparel called "It's Not The Gray, It's the Clothes." Kreamer states that the seasonal metaphors of the cosmetologist Bernice Kentner's Color Me a Season system have allowed beauticians "to find the best tone and hue for clients' particular complexions and coloring and hair." Kreamer also discusses her surprise when she discovered that she herself is a Summer according to Kentner's system. In 2011, Jules Standish wrote that Pat Scott Vincent's color analysis system Colourflair was "based on Bernice Kentner's methods."

In their article "Color Analysis in the Marketplace," Jo Ann Hilliker and Jean Rogers also wrote that Bernice Kentner's system "classifies individuals similar to the Color Me Beautiful approach, but she also recommends examining the iris of the eye to determine the right season. The Summer eye has a 'cracked glass' pattern. The Winter eye has 'spokes' from the pupil to the edge of the iris. A 'sunburst' surrounds the pupil of the Spring eye and the Autumn eye is distinguished by a ring of gold or brown around the pupil and brown flecks in the iris."

== Personal life ==
Bernice Kentner was a member of the Church of Jesus Christ of Latter-day Saints. She married Dean Kentner in the Spring of 1948.

== In popular culture ==
Bernice Kentner is the subject of the eponymously named song by Canadian indie rock band Baby Jey. Mp3 blog comeherefloyd described the song as a "light ironic look at the 80s phenomenon of seasonal color analysis while at the same time taking Bernice Kentner’s ideas on fashion to another level."

== Works ==
As per OCLC WorldCat.

| Year | Title |
|---|---|
| 1978 | Color Me A Season |
| 1980 | Tie Me Up with Rainbows |
| 1980 | Fashion Line and Design |
| 1980 | Understanding Yourself and Your Family Through Season Analysis |
| 1980 | Contouring the Face with Seasons' Lights and Color Glow |
| 1980 | Color: Its Effect on You and Others |
| 1980 | Your Crowning Glory |
| 1981 | A Rainbow in Your Eyes |
| 1985 | The Magnificent Eye |
| 1988 | The Fit and Fun of Fashion |
| 1988 | Yin and Yang: The Inner Story |
| 1990 | Cosmetic Makeup Artist's Manual |
| 1990 | Face Typing and Cosmetic Application |
| 1994 | My Life in Living Color |
| 2014 | The Fan & Selector Thesis |
