= Odyssey Productions =

American photography and 3-D computer animation company

PhotoCulture
- Company type: Private
- Industry: Photography and 3-D Computer Animation
- Founded: San Diego California, United States (1983)
- Founder: Steven Churchill
- Headquarters: San Diego California, U.S.
- Key people: Steven Churchill
- Products: Mind's Eye (series)
- Website: AnimationTrip.com

Odyssey Productions (formerly Odyssey Visual Design) is the former name of a California-based photography and 3-D computer animation company founded in 1983 by Steven Churchill. It was the first San Diego company to produce 3D computer animation and its clients have included Coca-Cola, General Dynamics, Union Oil, Southwestern Cable, Metrocast, Honda, and a number of TV stations across the country.

While Odyssey focused primarily on 35mm back-lit motion graphics and special effects for the first 3 years of its existence, its production of the world's first computer animation film festival in 1986 brought about a shift in focus to 3D computer animation. That exhibition was held at the Museum of Contemporary Art in La Jolla, California, followed by a second CGI film festival at the same venue in 1987. In 1988 nation-wide distribution was arranged with Landmark Theatres, showcasing the best of those films. The purpose was to raise public awareness of computer animation as an art form.

In 1988 Steven Churchill produced the award-winning release of the world's first home entertainment video of computer animation, State Of the Art Of Computer Animation. The video won the "Best Video Art" award from the American Film Institute at their American Video Conference Awards Show that year. The accolades and sales successes achieved by State Of the Art Of Computer Animation prompted the 1990 release of The Mind's Eye: A Computer Animation Odyssey, a title that would become the first member of the successful The Mind's Eye series. The next decade (1990–2000) would be taken up almost entirely with the production of 19 feature-length 3D computer-animated package films for home release.

The company's name became Odyssey Productions in 1995 and the last 12 computer animation films were released under this name. In 2003 the company again changed its name to AnimationTrip and broadened its focus to encompass photography to a greater extent. Under this new corporate name, the company added a business enterprise in 2004 focused primarily on photographic art and has launched a series of international art exhibitions in San Diego, California called the Art of Photography Show and the Art of Digital Show. Since 2006, exhibiting photographic art and promoting photo artists has been the full focus of the business. In 2010 the company was named PhotoCulture, Inc. PhotoCulture.com

== The Mind's Eye series ==
The Mind's Eye series consists of several package art films rendered using computer-generated imagery of varying levels of sophistication. The main series consists of 4 titles that were released between 1990 and 1996. The series was released on VHS (by BMG) and LaserDisc (by Image Entertainment) and later re-released on DVD (by Simitar Entertainment).

A number of Odyssey's videos additionally contain oblique references to the Mind's Eye series in their titles. These references are found in the tagline portions of the title and take the form of either "From the Makers of the Mind's Eye" or "The Mind's Eye Presents."

The main series consists of:

- The Mind's Eye: A Computer Animation Odyssey (1990)
- Beyond the Mind's Eye (1992)
- The Gate to the Mind's Eye (1994)
- Odyssey Into The Mind's Eye (1996)

== The Computer Animation series ==
Like the Mind's Eye series, the Computer Animation series consists of a main series of 3 computer-generated package films. The main Computer Animation series was released between 1993 and 1996 and was distributed by Sony Music Video. The 1997 release of Computer Animation Classics - consisting of 27 shorts from early experimental years of CGI animation - was regarded by reviewers as a collector's item of historical significance.

As before, a number of Odyssey's videos contain oblique references to the Computer Animation series in their titles. If these titles are considered a part of the series, this puts the total number of Computer Animation series titles at 11. This includes both State Of the Art Of Computer Animation (1988) and The Mind's Eye: A Computer Animation Odyssey (1990) which were produced prior to Computer Animation Festival Volume 1.0, the first member of the Computer Animation main series.

The main series consists of:

- Computer Animation Festival Volume 1.0 (1993)
- Computer Animation Festival Volume 2.0 (1994)
- Computer Animation Festival (1996)

== Released Films ==
Odyssey has produced the following 28 titles since its founding in 1983.

=== Odyssey Visual Design ===
- 1988 - State Of the Art Of Computer Animation Volume 1
- 1990 - The Mind's Eye: A Computer Animation Odyssey
- 1991 - State Of the Art Of Computer Animation Volume 2
- 1991 - The Mind's Eye: A Computer Animation Odyssey (Radio Shack version)
- 1992 - Beyond the Mind's Eye
- 1993 - Virtual Nature: A Computer Generated Visual Odyssey
- 1993 - Beyond the Mind's Eye (Radio Shack version)
- 1993 - Computer Animation Festival Volume 1.0
- 1993 - Computer Animation Collection
- 1994 - The Gate to the Mind's Eye
- 1994 - Imaginaria (co-produced with BMG Video)
- 1994 - Computer Animation Festival Volume 2.0
- 1994 - Cybervisions
- 1994 - Future Visions

=== Odyssey Productions ===
- 1996 - Odyssey Into The Mind's Eye (distributed by Sony Music Video) - A series of CGI shorts exploring themes of space and alien life. The collection features a score composed by Kerry Livgren
- 1996 - Computer Animation Festival
- 1997 - Turbulence (distributed by SMV) - A series of CGI shorts designed to explore the concepts of perception and hallucination.
- 1997 - Cyberscape: A Computer Animation Vision 45 minutes entirely created and co-produced by award-winning computer animator Beny Tchaicovsky, a surrealistic, fantastical "recreation" of the milestones of human history, spanning from primordial proto-humans to the idiosyncrasies of modern living. Music score by Peter Bernstein.
- 1997 - Computer Animation Classics (distributed by SMV) - A collection of 27 shorts from the early experimental days of CGI.
- 1997 - Computer Animation Showcase (distributed by SMV)
- 1998 - Luminous Visions
- 1999 - Computer Animation Celebration (distributed by SMV)
- 1999 - Ancient Alien (distributed by SMV) - A series of CGI shorts dealing with the concept of the timeless nature of myth. The soundtrack is scored by indie label Waveform Records.
- 1999 - Computer Animation Marvels
- 2000 - Little Bytes
- 2000 - Computer Animation Extravaganza
- 2004 - Computer Animation Journeys
- 2005 - Computer Animation Fantasies
