= Sullivan County Courthouse (Pennsylvania) =

- U.S. National Register of Historic Places
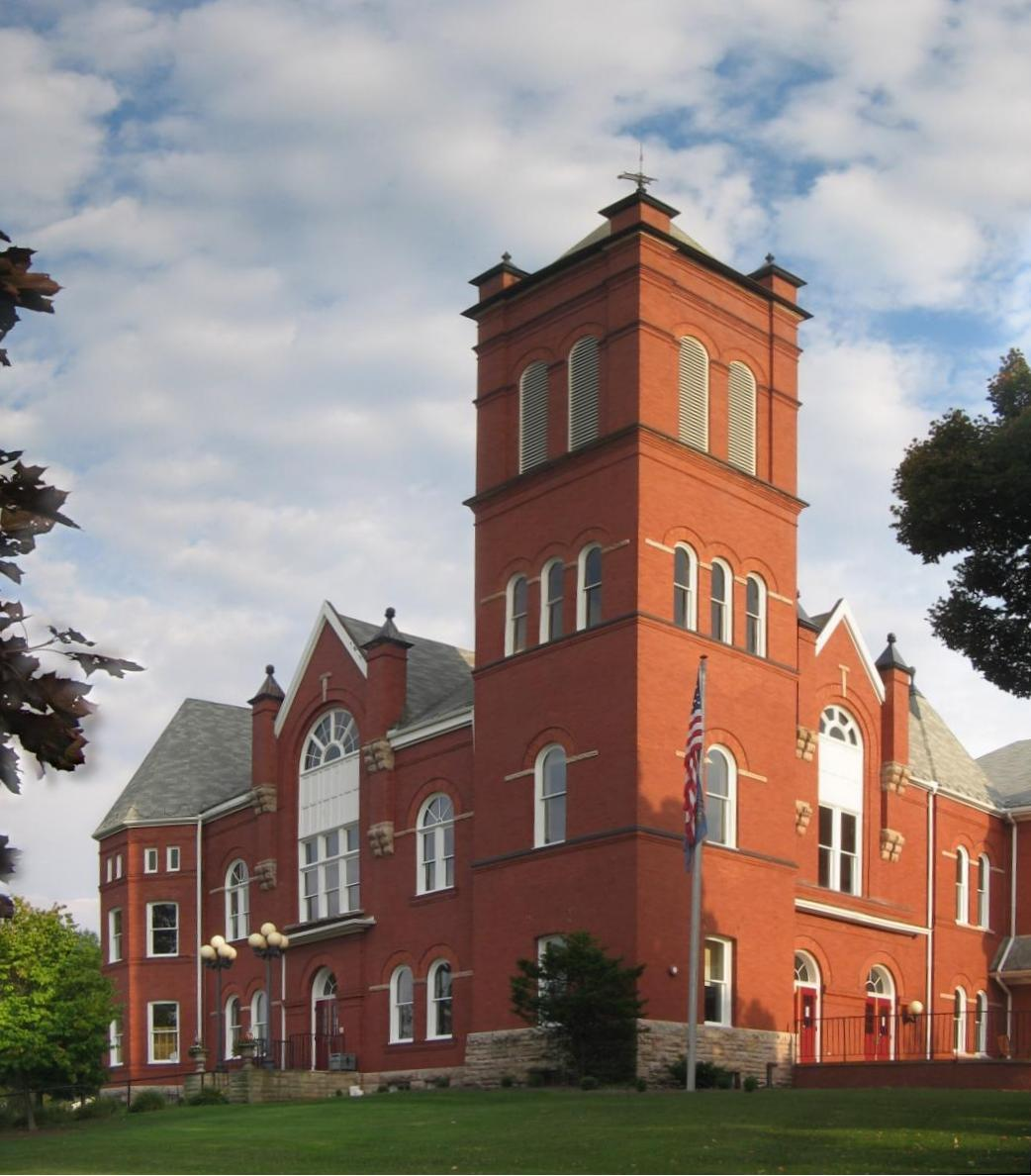
- Front of the courthouse

- Location within Pennsylvania Location within the United States
- Interactive map showing the location of Sullivan County Courthouse
- Location: Main and Muncy Sts., Laporte, Pennsylvania
- Coordinates: 41°25′25″N 76°29′39″W
- Area: 1.5 acres (0.61 ha)
- Built: 1894
- Architect: Wagner & Reitmeyer
- Architectural style: Romanesque
- NRHP reference No.: 78002472
- Added to NRHP: December 15, 1978

The Sullivan County Courthouse is a historic courthouse building in downtown Laporte, Pennsylvania, United States. Built in 1894, this Romanesque Revival courthouse is a rectangular building measuring approximately 92 feet by 60 feet, built of brick with a slate roof. Since its construction, it has been the most prominent building in Sullivan County.

It was listed on the National Register of Historic Places in 1978.

The building is located in the smallest and highest county seat in Pennsylvania, at an elevation of over 2,000 feet (610 m) above sea level.

== Background and history ==
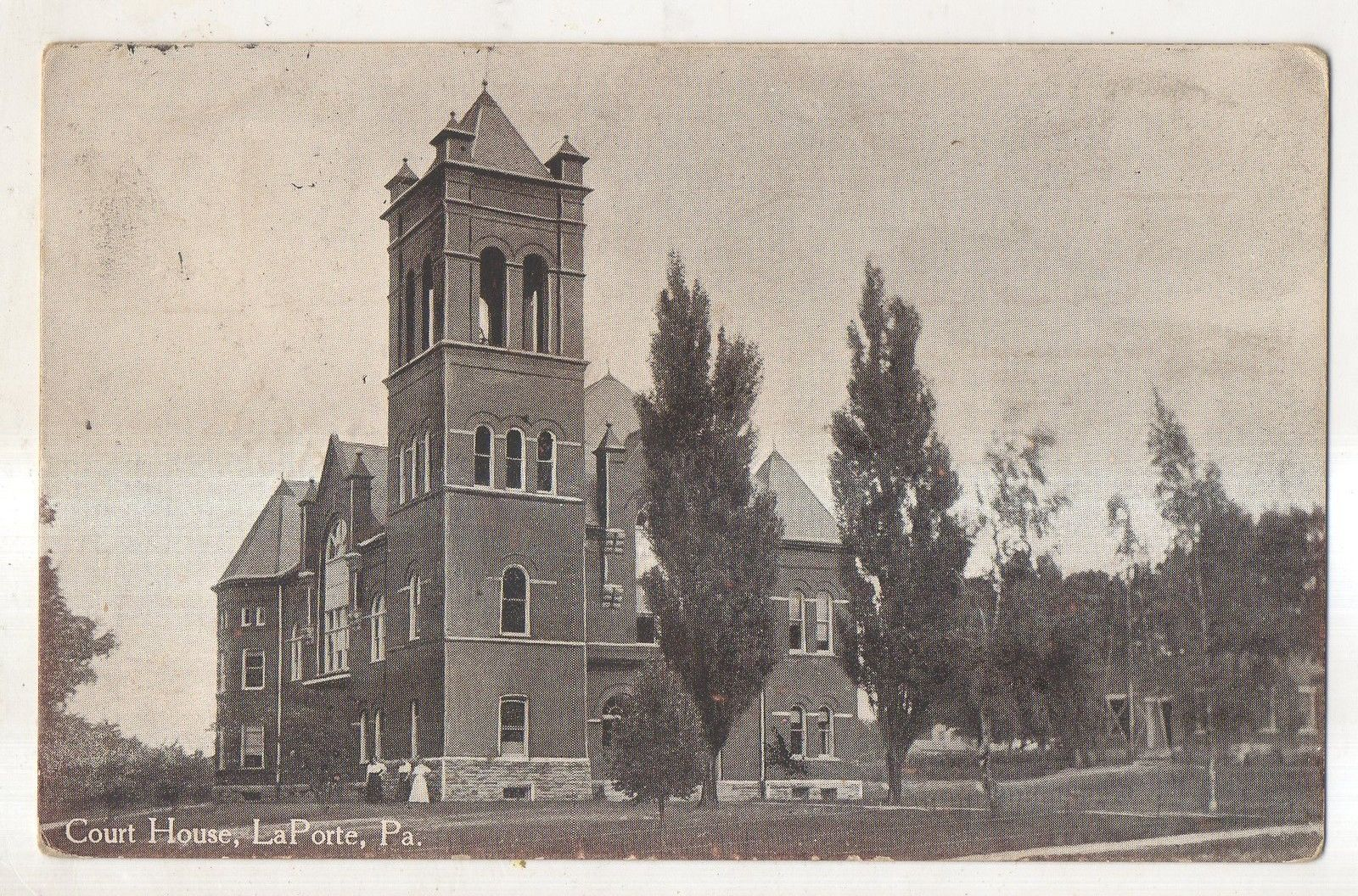
Courthouse on a 1918 postcard

Sullivan County was established in 1847. At this time, the county commissioners were informed by their council that they could use any building in the county, and the commissioners each had their own office. Initial plans to build a courthouse in Sullivan County were made as early as 1847. Despite some controversy about whether to place the courthouse in Forksville, Cherry Hill or Laporte, it was eventually decided that it would be located in Laporte. In 1851 Michael Meylert constructed the 44 foot square, three-story brick courthouse. By 1893, the old courthouse's walls were buckling and held together with iron rods. It was torn down in 15 days.

The architects Wagner & Reitmeyer of Williamsport designed the new courthouse. The Lawrence Brothers Builders were the contractors for the building, submitting a bid of $24,000. The bricks were laid by William Johnson and Thomas Edwards of Jamestown, New York, and James Gansel did the plastering. Construction began in June 1894 and the first court session in the new building was held in December.

Minor renovations were done in 1935. The slate roof was replaced with shingles in 1962, but these were replaced by slate in 2013. In 1969, an extension was built on the south side of the courthouse. Emergency lighting was installed in 1973 and the building's heating system was upgraded in 1977.

== Location and description ==
The main portion of the Sullivan County Courthouse has two floors, along with a basement, a chimney and a four-story bell tower. The building is made mostly of brick, but contains some cut stone and doors and windows are made of hardwood. The doors and windows have arched tops. The walls are 18 inches (46 cm) thick.

The main building is 92 by 60 feet (28 by 18 m), but the building also has a square-shaped area 28 feet (8.5 m) on a side. This area was used as a jail, and is now used for holding cells. The sheriff's residence was also in this part of the building, but he has long since moved out. The first floor of the building mainly consists of county offices, a sheriff's office, and the jail. A 50-by-60-foot (15 by 18 m) area of the second floor serves as a courtroom. The rest of the area mostly consists of small offices.

The Sullivan County Courthouse is located immediately southeast of the town square of the borough of Laporte. It is on the corner of Main Street and Muncy Street.

== See also ==
- List of state and county courthouses in Pennsylvania
