= You're Somebody Else =

Single by Flora Cash

from the album Nothing Lasts Forever (And It's Fine)
- Released: 20 April 2017
- Genre: indie pop; singer-songwriter
- Length: 3:39
- Label: RCA Records; Sony Music; Icons Creating Evil Art
- Songwriters: Shpresa Lleshaj; Cole Randall
- Producers: Cole Randall; Shpresa Lleshaj

Flora Cash singles chronology
"You're Somebody Else" (2017)	"They Own This Town" (2019)

Music video
- "You're Somebody Else" on YouTube

"You're Somebody Else" is a song by the Swedish-American indie pop duo Flora Cash. The song was initially included on the band's debut full-length album, Nothing Lasts Forever (And It's Fine), which was released on 20 April 2017 via Stockholm-based indie label Icons Creating Evil Art, before being licensed to Sony Music's RCA Records after achieving viral success. Upon the band's signing to RCA, the track was removed from the digital version of the album (worldwide, except in Scandinavia) while being allowed to remain on the vinyl version. The song achieved its initial viral success after being used in a Movistar commercial in Mexico promoting safety for young people meeting each other online. After debuting on Pandora Radio's Predictions chart in August 2018 and retaining the No. 4 spot there well into September, "You're Somebody Else", reached the Top 10 on both the Billboard Alternative Songs and Adult Alternative Songs airplay charts that November.

The song eventually reached the number one position on American radio on both the Mediabase Adult Alternative and Alternative radio formats.

To date, the track has garnered over 400 million streams on Spotify and the lyric video has been viewed over 200 million times on YouTube.

== Background ==
The song was written in less than 24 hours while songwriters Cole Randall and Shpresa Lleshaj were staying at Shpresa's sister's apartment in Stockholm. Shpresa's sister, Swedish actress Ariana Lleshaj and her fiancé had gone on a trip to New York, and asked if Cole and Shpresa would like to stay in their apartment for a change of scenery. The couple; Cole in particular, had been going through a period of anxiety leading up to the writing of the song.

== Song description ==
According to Cole and Shpresa, the main lyric in the song, you look like yourself but you're somebody else was "more a matter of one speaking to oneself than to another person." They went on to say, "sometimes when we’re dealing with psychological issues, we literally feel displaced internally; alien to ourselves. [The song] ended up taking on multiple meanings and perspectives but the root of it at the beginning was as a sort of self-talk, self-therapy."

== Critical reception ==
The song was given positive reviews. Steve Baltin, writing for Forbes Magazine wrote that "[Flora Cash's] brilliant "You're Somebody Else" is arguably the most intriguing song on radio this past year." Comeherefloyd wrote that the track "hounds and whispers that secret dark self doubt, deep within ourselves."

== Television ==
On 9 August 2018, Flora Cash performed "You're Somebody Else" on The Late Late Show with James Corden, marking their television debut.

On 28 February 2019, Flora Cash performed "You're Somebody Else" on Live with Kelly and Ryan, marking their first live television performance.

== Charts ==
=== Weekly charts ===
Chart (2018–2019)	Peak position
US Alternative (Mediabase)	1
Canada Modern Rock (Billboard)	1
US Hot Rock Songs (Billboard)	5
US Adult Top 40 (Billboard)	22

Chart (2020)	Peak position
Belgium (Ultratip Bubbling Under Flanders)	39

=== Year-end charts ===
Chart (2018)	Position
US Hot Rock Songs (Billboard)	62
Chart (2019)	Position
US Hot Rock Songs (Billboard)	27

== Certifications ==
Region	Certification	Certified units/sales
Australia (ARIA)	Platinum	70,000^{‡}
Canada (Music Canada)	2× Platinum	160,000^{‡}
France (SNEP)	Platinum	200,000^{‡}
Germany (BVMI)	Gold	200,000^{‡}
New Zealand (RMNZ)	Platinum	30,000^{‡}
Norway (IFPI Norway)	Gold	30,000^{‡}
Poland (ZPAV)	Platinum	50,000^{‡}
United Kingdom (BPI)	Gold	400,000^{‡}
United States (RIAA)	Platinum	1,000,000^{‡}
Streaming
Sweden (GLF)	Gold	4,000,000^{†}
^{‡} Sales+streaming figures based on certification alone.^{†} Streaming-only figures based on certification alone.
