= Someone Else =

Someone Else may refer to:

- Someone Else (film), a 2006 British film
- Someone Else, a 2004 album by Ira Losco

== Songs ==
- "Someone Else", by Duncan Laurence, 2020
- "Someone Else", by Astro from All Yours, 2021
- "Someone Else", by Grabbitz and Rezz, 2020
- "Someone Else", by Miley Cyrus from Bangerz, 2013
- "Someone Else", by Oliver Tree from Love You Madly Hate You Badly, 2026
- "Someone Else", by the Rasmus from Into, 2001
- "Someone Else", by Slushii from Out of Light, 2017
- "Someone Else", by Steve Angello from Wild Youth, 2016

== See also ==
- Somebody Else (disambiguation)
