= Bernice Goodman =

American social workers

- Bernice Goodman, from a 1979 publication
- Born: Bernice Evelyn Goodman; June 27, 1927; Hot Springs, Arkansas, U.S.
- Died: April 27, 2003 (aged 75)
- Occupations: Social worker, therapist, activist

Bernice Evelyn Goodman (June 27, 1927 – April 27, 2003) was an American social worker, therapist, and activist for women's rights, gay rights, child welfare, and civil rights. She was described as "one of the unsung heroes of the gay liberation movement."

== Early life and education ==
Goodman was born in Hot Springs, Arkansas, and raised in Long Beach, New York, the daughter of Bernard L. Goodman and Dorothy K. Neumann Goodman. Her family was Jewish. She graduated from the University of Wisconsin in 1948. She earned a master's degree in social work at Columbia University School of Social Work.

== Career ==
Goodman was a social worker and "one of New York's few openly lesbian therapists" in the early 1970s. In 1973, she and Charles Silverstein were prominent in the successful effort to removed homosexuality from the American Psychiatric Association's list of mental disorders. She and Silverstein co-founded Identity House, a peer counseling program in New York. Identity House developed into the Institute for Human Identity. In 1976 she started a lesbian writers' group with some of her patients, including Audre Lorde, Blanche Cook, Michelle Cliff, and Adrienne Rich. She also studied lesbian mothers and their children's lives, and created the first policies on the care of lesbian and gay clients at the National Association of Social Workers Delegate Assembly in 1978.

Goodman served on the board of the National Lesbian and Gay Health Foundation (NLGHF). She spoke to professional and community groups about gay rights and sexuality topics. She was a keynote speaker at the National Gay Health Conference in New York City in 1979.

== Publications ==
- The Lesbian Mother (1973, with Barbara Glickman)
- The Lesbian: A Celebration of Difference (1977, published by Joan Larkin's Out and Out Books)
- Confronting Homophobia (1978)
- "Some Mothers are Lesbians" (1980)
- "Where Will You Be?" The Professional Oppression of Gay People: A Lesbian/Feminist Perspective (1980)
- "How to Choose a Nonhomophobic Therapist" (1984)

== Personal life ==
Goodman died in 2003, at the age of 75.
