= Lake Mokoma =

Reservoir in Sullivan County, Pennsylvania, United States

Coordinates: 41.42164°N 76.48451°W

Lake Mokoma is a north-central Pennsylvania, United States, lake that was developed in the late 19th century. Ellery Ingham and W.C. Mason wanted to take advantage of the arrival of the trains to nearby Laporte, and so they incorporated the Lake Mokoma Land Company in 1887 and built an earthen dam. It was to be a rival to the resort at Eagles Mere, about 5 miles away. By 1894, the lake had a steam vessel, a pavilion, and bath houses. The Lake Mokoma Land Company was not successful and another company, the Lake Mokoma Company, took over the lake in 1908. That company also failed after creating a beachhouse and dance hall. The next company, the Lake Mokoma Development Corporation took over in 1939. In 1959 the owners of the properties got together and bought the lake from the Corporation and created the current Lake Mokoma Association.

The facilities of the Lake Mokoma Association are used by about 190 active and associate members and their guests. Goals of the Association are to manage the area "to preserve and develop without profit motive the beauty, natural resources, recreational opportunities and other attributes of the property which are conducive to the pleasurable pursuits of Association members."

== See also ==
- List of lakes in Pennsylvania
