= List of storms named Bernice =

The name Bernice has been used for five tropical cyclones in the Eastern Pacific Ocean.

- Tropical Storm Bernice (1962), made landfall in Baja California
- Tropical Storm Bernice (1965), formed south of Puerto Angel, Mexico, and moved parallel to the coast
- Hurricane Bernice (1969), Category 1 hurricane that remained in the open ocean
- Tropical Storm Bernice (1973), made landfall southwest of Zihuatanejo
- Tropical Storm Bernice (1977), formed in the open ocean
