= Beny Tchaicovsky =

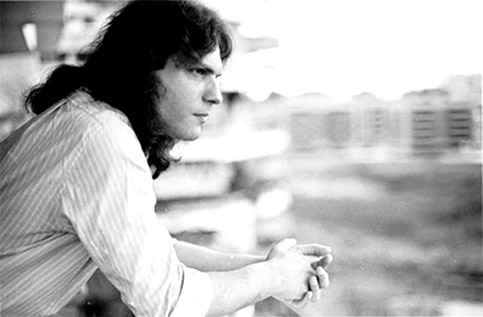
- Born: November 3, 1954; Rio de Janeiro
- Died: 2009; Gassin, Provence-Alpes-Côte d'Azur
- Known for: Drawing, Painting, Computer Art, 3D Animation, Music Composer.
- Movement: Esoteric Realism, Abstract Art, Surrealism, Fantastic Realism, Visionary Art.
- Website: Beny Tchaicovsky Website

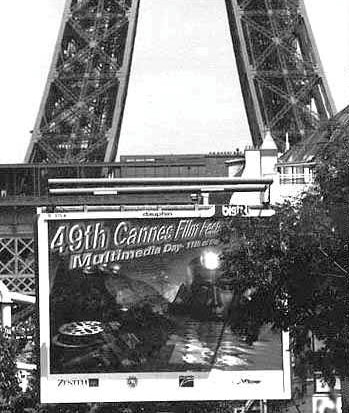
The Visionary displayed on billboards in the streets of Paris

Beny Tchaicovsky (1954–2009) was a painter, musician and a multimedia computer artist. Tchaicovsky's paintings have been exhibited internationally in museums such as the Luxembourg Museum in Paris with the 1989 show "Les Trois Amériques à Paris", as well as in exhibitions in Germany, Brazil and the United States. Tchaicovsky's numerous awards include The Visionary, awarded first place for the best cyberposter on International Multimedia Day at the 49th Cannes Film Festival in 1996.

== Career ==
In the early 1990s, after two decades of a career as a painter and musician living in Europe, Tchaicovsky moved to Marin County in California and began expanding his 2D art into 3D and 4D.

In 1989 Tchaicovsky won a gold medal for his paintings at the International Connection Brazil-Japan Exhibition in Rio de Janeiro and First Place award with his painting "The Last Crusade" in a competition at the Natzoula Naveles Gallery in Davis, California.

In 1993 he established "ZOE Productions" a 3D computer animation company based in his studio in Fairfax, California. In 1994, segments of Tchaicovsky's animation were included in the VHS compilation The Gate to the Mind’s Eye, It featured, among others, his 3D animation titled "Quantum Mechanics", which included segments of his short 3D animations titled "Modus Vivendi", "Delirium Tremendus" and "House of Mirrors". "Out of Step," "The Traveller" and "Intelligent Life", segments from Tchaicovsky's Cyberscape, were seen in the 1996 compilation Odyssey into the Mind's Eye, a 45-minute program and latest addition to the Mind’s Eye series distributed by Sony Music Video.

In 1997, after three years, Zoe Productions released its first full feature 3D computer animation project, Cyberscape: A Computer Animation Vision. The sound track was co-produced with Odyssey Productions and distributed by Sony Music Video. Cyberscape's original 3D animation was conceptualized and produced by Tchaicovsky.

Cyberscape opened a new dimension in computer generated animation. Its 3D animation is a dazzling and surreal journey through humanities evolution. Tchaicovsky used symbolism and mythology, compressed in a fast paced video, which in a wry humor plays out humanity's progress from the primordial garden of Eden to quantum mechanics.

— Gaby Frischlander, Tchaikovsky: Beyond the Realm of Duality

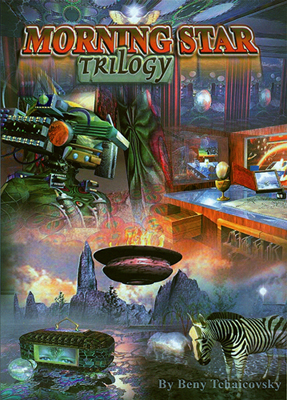
Poster for the Morning Star Trilogy

In 2001, Tchaicovsky released three more DVDs: the Morning Star Trilogy titled The Call (46:00 min), Caught Between Worlds (49:00 min) and Dimensional Connections (52:37 min). In 2005, Tchaicovsky completed two more 3D feature works, Memoirs of a Shadow (72 min) and Luz Oferenda (40 min). Tchaicovsky's last work, ZyconX1 was unfinished.

== Discography ==
Explorer (Album, 1983)

== Style & Exploration of 3D tools as an art form ==
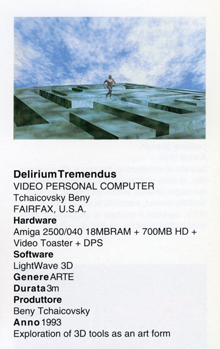

At an early age, Tchaicovsky started with black ink sketches before progressing to acrylic paintings. His canvases depict surrealistic visions. Tchaicovsky's style of expression has been described as surrealist art, fantastic art, metaphysical art and visionary art.

Tchaicovsky's 3D art expresses humanity's existentialist desolation and increased fragmentation. His digital animations are rich with images, symbols and personal mythology. They carry two clear messages: the perilous direction taken by modern technology oriented society and the need for self-exploration.

— Jacob Klintowitz, "Explorer of Reality", Tchaikovsky: Beyond the Realm of Duality

== Death ==
In 2005, he returned to Rio de Janeiro and in 2007, after spending some time in Israel, he moved to the south of France where he spent the last two years of his life painting abstract images and photographing nature. Tchaicovsky passed away in his studio in Gassin in November 2009.
