= Color analysis =

Process of determining the colors that best suit an individual's natural coloring

Color analysis (American English; colour analysis in Commonwealth English), also known as personal color analysis (PCA), seasonal color analysis, or skin-tone matching, is a term often used within the cosmetics and fashion industry to describe a method of determining the colors of clothing and cosmetics that harmonize with the appearance of a person's skin complexion, eye color, sclera color (although rarely) and hair color for use in wardrobe planning and style consulting.

== Background ==
In the 1920s, a color revolution occurred in the United States with the development of new color industries and the possibility of producing color swatch books used as a marketing tool. Personal color analysis reached a height in popularity in the early 1980s with a recent resurgence in the 2010s after further development and promotion of different versions of seasonal analysis by image and color consultants worldwide. Seasonal analysis is a technique that attempts to place individual coloring into the tonal groupings of Winter, Spring, Summer and Autumn, and their sub-variants. A 2026 study examining clothing colour preferences found that participants generally preferred cooler blue hues for fair skin and warmer orange and red hues for tanned skin. However, the study focused on White women's skin tones and did not establish the validity of traditional seasonal colour classifications. Therefore, the approach can vary greatly among different schools of thought; A 2007 study comparing three personal color analysis systems found inconsistencies in how their color palettes applied hue, saturation, and value. Although the systems claimed to use all three characteristics, many of their palette types relied on only two. Some color analysis systems classify an individual's personal combination of hair color, eye color and skin tone using labels that refer to a color's "temperature" (cool blue vs. warm yellow) and the degree to which the hair, skin and eye colors contrast. Cosmetic colors often have been determined by hair color, eye color, or the combination of hair and eye color.

The successful practical application of a color analysis will theoretically allow the individual to coordinate their clothing and accessories with greater ease and avoid costly mistakes by purchasing items that are not within their color palette. However, color analysis has continued to be controversial due to the lack of standard training or degree required to market oneself as a color analyst. This can become costly for the individual, both in regard to the fees of professional and less than professional analyses, and subsequent clothing and cosmetics purchases.

== History ==
=== Early history (1850s–early 1970s) ===
==== Chevreul ====
Michel Eugène Chevreul (1786–1889) was a French chemist whose career took a new direction in 1824 when he was appointed director of dyeing at the Gobelins Manufactory in Paris, where he worked for 28 years. After receiving several complaints about the lack of consistency in the dye colors, Chevreul determined that the issue was not chemical but optical and focused his attention on exploring optical color mixing. He published his groundbreaking findings in The Laws of Contrast of Colour (1839) where he discussed the concept of simultaneous contrast (the colors of two different objects affect each other), successive contrast (a negative afterimage effect), and mixed contrast.

Chevreul's studies in color became the most widely used and influential color manual of the 19th century with a significant and long-lasting impact on the fine and industrial arts. As well as being the first to create a hemispherical color model displaying 72 normal tone hue scales, his exploration of color harmonies is an underlying principle in personal color analysis. In the 1850s, Chevreul's ideas were prescribed for an American audience lacking any education in color harmony. Godey's Lady's Book (1855 and 1859) introduced "gaudy" American women to Chevreul's ideas of "becoming colors" for brunettes and blondes.

==== Munsell ====
Albert Henry Munsell (1858–1918) is famous for inventing the Munsell color system, one of the first color order systems created. An American painter and art teacher at the Massachusetts Normal Art School, he had visited the tapestry works of Chevreul and studied color in France. With the use of his own unique inventions, including the Photometer that measures object luminance, Munsell started to determine color spaces and standardize the way color was organized and defined.

In 1905, Munsell published his first of three books on color. A Color Notation where he discussed his color theory referencing three color dimensions: hue (the discernible shade on the wavelength spectrum), value (lightness to darkness scale), and chroma (softness through to brightness). Before the Munsell Color Theory, the intensity of color was defined as 'saturation' in the art and scientific community. Munsell determined that saturation encompassed two different dimensions, value and chroma, where chroma defines the difference between a pure hue and a pure grey.

Munsell paid close attention to the human visual system and human response to color, being sensitive to its inclusion in his mapping of three-dimensional color space. In 1917, Munsell founded the Munsell Color Company, to improve color communication and education. In the 1930s, the Munsell Color System was adopted by the USDA as the official color system for soil research and the system. The company is now owned by X-Rite who is known for color calibration. The Munsell Color System still remains the basis of color education today and is the foundation for modern color systems including CIELAB.

==== Itten ====
Johannes Itten (1888–1967) was a Swiss-born artist and art educator who expounded upon the principles of simultaneous contrast which Chevreul set forth in his 1839 treatise. He valued individual artistic expression and in 1928, while teaching a class assignment on color harmony, he noticed his students were choosing colors, lines and orientation that showed themselves "as they are", which led him to formulate the concept of "subjective color".

In his 1961 book The Art of Color, Itten examined two different approaches to understanding the art of color: Subjective feelings and objective color principles. Itten described "subjective color" as "the aura of the person. and provided examples or how subjective color might be expressed by an artist: A high contrast brunette will choose dark colors and high contrast, "suggesting a lively and concentrated personality and intense feeling." On the other hand, for a fair woman of low contrast the "fundamental contrast is hue". Furthermore, Itten linked these subjective colors to the four seasons of Spring, Summer, Autumn, and Winter, which became the foundation for seasonal color analysis. In his book, Itten noted that, "Every woman should know what colors are becoming to her; they will always be her subjective colors and their complements."

Itten believed that "subjective colors" were of a lower artistic value and significance than what he deemed "objective colors," which were color harmonies of a higher order. In his final chapter titled 'Composition', Itten spoke of bringing two or more colors together in such a way that they harmonize to give an expression unambiguous and full of character.

==== Dorr ====
Robert C. Dorr (1905–1979) was an American artist who, in 1928, observed the harmonious effects of paint colors when grouping those of either a green or yellow undertone. In 1934 Chicago, Dorr began working on furniture design using his own color theory of undertones and developed his ideas on color psychology. After working on a textile group for a manufacturer, he became a professional color consultant for cosmetic companies.

Dorr's Color Key System defined an individual's complexion as being either Key I (cool blue undertone) or Key II (warm yellow undertone). Each palette in The Color Key Program contains 170 colors per fan. Orange and magenta are the color indicants of yellow and blue undertones respectively. Dorr's Color Key Program took all races into consideration and no race was limited to any one Key palette.

After moving to California in the late 1950s, Dorr taught courses and gave lectures on his Color Key Program until his death in 1979. The color company Devoe Reynolds developed paint chips using their Key 1 & Key 2 color matching system from Robert Dorr.

=== Caygill ===
Suzanne Caygill (1911–1994) was an American fashion designer and color theorist who developed the Caygill Method of Color Analysis. A milliner, poet, dress designer and night club singer, as a young adult, Caygill turned her attention to color in 1945 and devoted the rest of her life to creating individual style guides and color palettes for clients and teaching design seminars. Caygill may have been influenced by her association with Edith Head, wardrobe designer and consultant to Hollywood studios and stars.

In the 1950s, Caygill starred in a self-improvement television program on fashion and relationships, Living With Suzanne, which aired on CBS in Los Angeles and began to teach seminars in which she described her work on style, personality, line, and color. Many devotees attended her classes, adapted and popularized her theories of personality style and color analysis in the late 1970s and 80s.

In 1980, she published Color: The Essence of You and established the Academy of Color. In this book, Caygill identified a wide range of sub-groups within each season, and gave them descriptive names such as "Early Spring", "Metallic Autumn", or "Dynamic Winter", each with its own set of special characteristics. Caygill believed in the fundamental link between style, color and a person's personality. The Suzanne Caygill Papers, circa 1950–1990, are held within the Division of Rare and Manuscript Collections, Cornell University Library, Cornell University.

=== Seasonal skin tone color matching for clothing and cosmetics ===
Starting in the 1970s, the availability of high-quality, accurate and inexpensive color printing made it possible for the first time to produce books for the mass market in which skin tones and clothing colors could be accurately reproduced. Color reproduction technology was still not perfect, causing Carole Jackson to warn her readers, "Because it is difficult to print the color swatches 100 percent accurately, ... verbal descriptions will help you understand the concept of your colors when you shop for clothes." The result was the near-simultaneous publication by a number of authors of books proposing systems of color analysis designed to allow the reader to "discover which shades of color in clothes complement your natural coloring to look healthier, sexier and more powerful."

The authors of these books all present roughly similar ideas. Most agree, for example, on the following basic points:

- Most rely upon a color system in which the colors are divided into four groups (and often further divided into sub-groups of the original four groups) of harmonious colors which are said to match with the four seasons of the year. The seasons are, to some degree, arbitrary, and it sometimes happens that someone will be on the cusp of two seasons. But, as Carole Jackson insists, "with testing, one palette will prove to be better [more harmonious] than the other." Jackson also acknowledges, however, that the reference to the four seasons is nothing more than a convenient artifice: "We could call your coloring 'Type A', 'Type B', and so on, but comparison with the seasons provides a more poetic way to describe your coloring and your best colors."
- An individual's basic color category, or season, remains the same over their lifetime, and is not affected by tanning, because "[w]e still have the same color skin, but in a darker hue."
- Skin color, rather than hair or eye color, determines a person's season. Bernice Kentner warns, "Remember, do not rely on hair coloring to find your Season!"

=== 2020s ===
In the 2020s the concept received renewed attention, becoming a viral phenomenon and drawing what the New York Times in 2024 called "views and exasperation on TikTok".

With the growing popularity of personal color analysis on social media, researchers have begun examining the consistency of its classification methods. A 2026 study of lipstick color classifications used by Japanese Instagram influencers found that warm and cool color categories were more consistent with measurable color characteristics than the traditional four-season classifications, suggesting that sorting into warm and cool may be more straightforward than sorting into the categories of Winter, Summer, Autumn, and Spring.

== Color psychology ==
Color psychology, an extension of color analysis, is a tool used in conjunction with the analysis of colors.

== Bibliography ==
- Deborah Chase, The Medically Based No Nonsense Beauty Book (1975)
- Bernice Kentner, Color Me a Season (1978)
- Carole Jackson, Color Me Beautiful (1980)
- Mary Spillane and Christine Sherlock, Color Me Beautiful's Looking Your Best (1995)
- Joanne Nicholson and Judy Lewis-Crum, Color Wonderful (1986)
- Alan Flusser, Dressing the Man (2002)

== Sources ==
- Jackson, Carole (1984). Color for Men. (See full citation for this book in the References section.)
- Kentner, Bernice (1978). Color Me a Season. (See full citation for this book in the References section.)
