= Bernice Neugarten =

American psychologist

- Born: Bernice Levin; February 11, 1916; Norfolk, Nebraska, United States
- Died: July 22, 2001 (aged 85); Chicago, Illinois, United States
- Education: University of Chicago
- Known for: Life course Aging; Menopause
- Awards: Gold Medal Award for Life Achievement in Psychology (1996) from the American Psychological Association
- Scientific career
- Fields: Psychology, Human Development
- Workplaces: University of Chicago; Northwestern University

Bernice Neugarten (born Bernice Levin; February 11, 1916 – July 22, 2001) was an American psychologist who specialized in adult development and the psychology of aging.

== Biography ==
Neugarten was born to a Jewish family in Norfolk, Nebraska, where she spent her childhood and early teenage years. Neugarten started as an early undergraduate at the University of Chicago at the age of 16, obtaining her bachelor's degree in English and French Literature in 1936. She also obtained a master's degree in educational psychology (1937) and a Ph.D. in human development (1943). In 1960, Neugarten was the first person at the University of Chicago to gain tenure in the field of human development and began many studies on the lifespan and human aging.

Neugarten was one of the first to look deep within the field of aging. Neugarten was the first to teach “Adult Development and Aging” and she continued to teach it for 30 years. For years, it was the only course of its kind offered. This course was a model for other universities. She also broke many stereotypes about aging, such as the midlife crisis, menopause being a necessarily traumatic experience, and the empty nest syndrome. Her research dispelled the notion of a midlife crisis and showed that there was no single successful route into aging. She also critiqued stage and stepwise models of adult development and emphasized the role of chance in determining adult careers. In her work on successful aging, she argued for a more complex and heterogeneous view of older person. In particular, the "young old" (in their 60s) were often quite active and socially involved, sometimes moving back into cities or otherwise making new lives for themselves once their children were grown and on their own.

Following her retirement from the University of Chicago, Bernice was invited to found a doctoral program in human development and social policy at Northwestern University's School of Education and Social Policy. She later returned to the University of Chicago as a Rothschild Distinguished Scholar at the Center on Aging, Health, and Society.

Neugarten was recognized by numerous professional organizations and government agencies. She was president of the American Gerontological Society, and a member of the National Advisory Council of the National Institute on Aging. She was named a member of the Technical Committee on Research and Demonstration for the 1971 White House Conference on Aging and was an organizer of the follow-up White House conference in 1982. The coauthor or editor of eight books and the author of more than 150 journal articles, Neugarten was well recognized in the research community. She died in her apartment in Hyde Park, Chicago on Sunday, July 22, 2001 at the age of 85. Her husband, Fritz Neugarten, predeceased her in 1990.

== Awards and distinctions ==
Bernice Neugarten was president of the Gerontological Society of America starting in 1969. She was elected a Fellow of the American Academy of Arts and Sciences in 1980. She also served a term on the United States Federal Council on Aging twelve years later in 1981. Neugarten was also a key contributor in the 1971 and 1982 White House Conferences on Aging.

Neugarten received the Gold Medal Award for Life Achievement in Psychology in 1996 from the American Psychological Association. This award was one of her biggest achievements. The award recognizes an individual's distinguished career and long-lasting contributions to the use of psychology in the public interest. In 1972 Neugarten received the “Robert W. Kleemeier Award” for her excellence in the field of gerontology and in 1975 Neugarten received the “Distinguished Contribution to Education in Psychology Award.” The University of Chicago also named an award after Neugarten to honor her contributions in the field of aging.

== Selected publications ==
=== Research papers ===
- Neugarten, B. L. (1996). The Meanings of Age: selected papers of Bernice L. Neugarten. Chicago: The University of Chicago Press.
- Neugarten, B. L. (1986). Our Aging Society: paradox and promise. (pp. 33–53). New York: Carnegie Corporation.
- Neugarten, B. L. (1979). Time, age, and the life cycle. The American Journal of Psychiatry.
- Neugarten, B. L. (1976). Adaptation and the life cycle. The counseling psychologist, 6(1), 16-20.
- Neugarten, B. L. (1974). Age groups in American society and the rise of the young-old. The annals of the American academy of political and social science, 415(1), 187-198.
- Neugarten, B. L., Moore, J. W., & Lowe, J. C. (1965). Age norms, age constraints, and adult socialization. American journal of Sociology, 70(6), 710-717.
- Neugarten, B. L., & Weinstein, K. K. (1964). The changing American grandparent. Journal of Marriage and the Family, 199-204.
- Neugarten, B. L., Havighurst, R. J., & Tobin, S. S. (1961). The measurement of life satisfaction. Journal of gerontology.

=== Books ===
- Neugarten, B. L. (Ed.). (1968). Middle age and aging (Vol. 10). University of Chicago press.
