= Berenice Panchrysos =

Berenice Panchrysos Βερενίκη Πάνχρυσος
- Town
- Interactive map of Berenice Panchrysos
- Country: Ancient Egypt

Berenice Panchrysos (Ancient Greek: Βερενίκη Πάνχρυσος, Steph. B., s. v.; Strabo xvi. 771), was an ancient town of ancient Egypt, near Sabae in the Regio Troglodytica, on the west coast of the Red Sea, between the 20th and 21st degrees of North latitude, in modern-day Sudan.

It obtained the appellation of all-golden (Panchrysos) from its vicinity to the gold mines of Jebel Allaqi (Jebel Ollaki), from which the ancient Egyptians drew their principal supplies of that metal, and in the working of which they employed criminals and prisoners of war. (Plin. vi. 34.)
