= Flora Cash =

Swedish–American musical duo

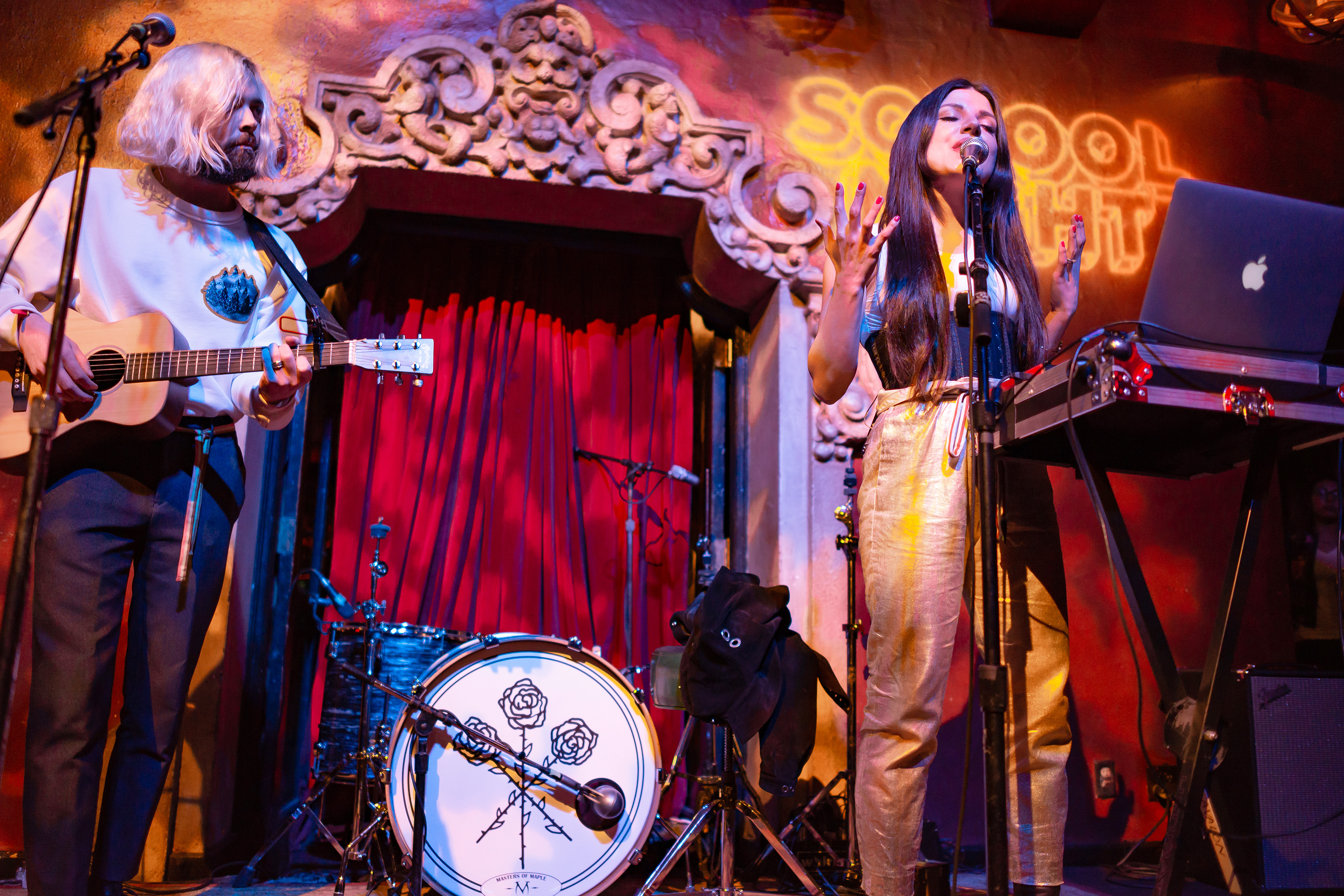
- Flora Cash performing in 2018

Background information
- Origin: Stockholm, Sweden
- Genres: Indie pop; indie folk; dark pop; singer-songwriter; classical
- Years active: 2012–present
- Labels: RCA; Sony; Legacy; Icons Creating Evil Art; Flower Money
- Members: Shpresa Lleshaj; Cole Randall
- Website: floracash.com

Flora Cash is a Swedish–American duo formed by Kosovo-born Shpresa Lleshaj and American musician Cole Randall. The two met on SoundCloud in 2012 and became musical partners. Their music, blending melancholic melodies and a mix of genres, reflects their diverse backgrounds and has garnered mainstream recognition, most notably with the single "You're Somebody Else", from their 2017 album, Nothing Lasts Forever (And It's Fine). This track achieved the number-one position on American alternative radio and received Platinum and Gold certifications in various countries, including the United States. With the 2023 release of the EP Vår Pil (Piano Quintet Suite för Rocker Peggy), Flora Cash expanded their musical oeuvre to include classical music. As of 2026, the duo has published four studio albums and ten EPs, as well as numerous singles.

== History ==
=== Formation and early releases: 2012–2016 ===
Lleshaj, an Albanian originally from Kosovo, whose family fled to Sweden while she was a child to escape war and conflict in the region, was living in Stockholm when she met Randall, from Minneapolis, on SoundCloud in 2012. Lleshaj began commenting on the tracks Randall had posted and the two discovered they appreciated each other's music. After meeting in person in Minneapolis, they began working together in Sweden as Flora Cash. The duo has said that they've never revealed the origin or meaning of their band name to anyone.

They released their debut EP, Mighty Fine, on December 12, 2012. Their second EP, Made It for You, came out on June 13, 2013. That year, Lleshaj and Randall also married. A third EP, I Will Be There, followed on September 20, 2014.

After signing with Swedish label Icons Creating Evil Art in 2015, they released Can Summer Love Last Forever? in March 2016. The seven-song mini-LP earned them nominations for two GAFFA awards, as Swedish Artist of the Year and Swedish Newcomer of the Year.

=== Debut album and breakthrough: 2017–2018 ===
Flora Cash released their debut full-length album, Nothing Lasts Forever (And It's Fine), in April 2017. Earmilk gave it nine out of ten stars and called it "as delicate and fragile as the core values the two write for, truth, beauty and living for the moment in a modern world where everything is taken for granted".

The duo broke into the mainstream with their song "You're Somebody Else", a track from Nothing Lasts Forever (And It's Fine), which achieved its initial success after being used in a viral Movistar commercial in Mexico promoting safety for young people meeting each other online.

In July 2018, they signed to Sony Music's RCA Records.

After debuting on Pandora Radio's Predictions chart in August 2018 and retaining the #4 spot into September, "You're Somebody Else" reached the Top 10 on both Billboard's Alternative Songs and Adult Alternative Songs airplay charts that November. The song reached the number one position on American radio on both the Mediabase Adult Alternative and alternative radio formats.

On August 9, 2018, Flora Cash made their American television debut, performing "You're Somebody Else" on The Late Late Show with James Corden. They followed that a year later when they performed the track on Live with Kelly and Ryan, marking their first live television performance. To date, the song has garnered over 500 million streams on Spotify and the lyric video has been viewed over 200 million times on YouTube. The track was certified Platinum in the US by the RIAA in 2021. It was also certified Gold in Australia, Norway, and Sweden, and Silver in the UK.

=== Subsequent releases: 2018–present ===
In late 2019, Flora Cash announced their first U.S. headlining tour for early 2020, called the Baby, It's Okay tour. It sold out within several days but was subsequently cancelled due to the outbreak of the COVID-19 pandemic.

In March 2020, Flora Cash released Baby, It's Okay, their second full-length album, on RCA Records.

Cole and Shpresa's first child was born in November 2020.

On October 22, 2021, Flora Cash released their third full-length album, Our Generation, to popular and critical acclaim. Regarding the record, The Spill Magazine wrote, "Musically gifted and true poets of the 21st century, Flora Cash brings connection to the connectionless and inspires the heartbroken to keep looking for love. A cutting-edge band that doesn't confine itself to one sound, Our Generation is a wonderful example of what strongwriting and production can look like." Loud Magazine listed the record as one of the best of 2021, writing, "'our generation' is [Flora Cash's] best experience so far." The release of the album landed the pair on the cover of the popular arts and culture magazine Gaffa for the November 2021 edition, along with an accompanying interview. The breakout single from Our Generation, "Soul Mate", has garnered more than 25 million streams on Spotify, and the accompanying video has received over two million views.

On November 10, 2023, coinciding with their daughter Rocker Peggy's third birthday, Flora Cash unexpectedly released a classical suite titled Vår Pil (Piano Quintet Suite för Rocker Peggy). This piece, composed of four piano quintets, was dedicated to their daughter and received acclaim from music critics. SoundVille commenting on the release, remarked, "...in today's era of TikTok and fast streaming services, it's very challenging to engage the younger generation with classical music. flora cash, as representatives of the modern generation and movement, took the risk to do so..." Additionally, SoundVille praised the emotional depth of the music, stating, "such magnificent music as found in the [suite], can only be created with boundless love for family, music, and art. Indie Boulevard also reviewed the album positively, describing it as a "timeless instrumental masterpiece...", going on to conclude that "experimenting with different genres and sounds is flora cash's true creed, and their latest EP confirms that [their] talent knows no boundaries or genre limitations." Tunitemusic noted the suite's emotional resonance and melodic focus, suggesting a stylistic affinity with the contemporary stylings of composers such as Ólafur Arnalds, Nils Frahm, and Ludovico Einaudi, stating, "...the [suite] takes a sentimental journey through emotions. The music in the album is mostly driven by melody, rather than rhythm, weaving a delicate tapestry..."

On October 24, 2024, Flora Cash released their fourth studio album, behind every beautiful thing. It has been praised as their most emotionally potent work to date, with Chris Buxton of Banger of the Day calling it "their magnum opus". Ben McCoy of UNXIGNED described it as "a masterclass in emotional storytelling", while Helena Lynch of Voxwave magazine highlighted its intimate and confessional nature, stating, "It blends honest revelations and bitter irony, hope, often deceptive, and subtle doubts. Each track balances contrasts, almost as if heaven and hell walk hand in hand."

The album explores themes of love, vulnerability, and the complexities of life, with Joey Yusician of APPPPC noting, "Life is complicated. Relationships are complicated. And so are people... even in the face of tremendous uncertainty, there is hope." Tracks like "Just Wanna Feel You", "Like No One Could", and "My Ex Would've Left by Now" were particularly praised for their emotional resonance and dual-vocal interplay. Graeme Smith of York Calling commended the album's unpredictability, saying, "Their dual vocals work beautifully throughout the album, giving us plenty of variation in a collection that always keeps us guessing."

Featuring contributions from Djordje Miljanovic (violin, viola) and Yoed Nir (cello), behind every beautiful thing was also praised for its lush arrangements and melancholic yet hopeful soundscapes. Eduard Banulescu of Alt77 summed it up, stating, "Flora Cash is not a band that lacks the guts... Nothing lasts forever. Things fall apart. But, maybe in all of that turmoil lies beauty."

== Artistry ==
Before the pair met, Randall was creating what the duo described as "unpolished and raw Americana folkie music", while Lleshaj was "writing more atmospheric electronic songs." Lleshaj stated, "There was a definite overlap, and the sound that we have created as Flora Cash is a combination of how we have changed in terms of our individual tastes and how our synergy has grown over the years." Randall conveyed a similar sentiment, stating, "The things we write about is our lives and our experience. We don't write music to appeal to a certain audience. We don't write music because we think it's going to sound good, that it's going to sell, or this or that. Everything that we've ever done is an honest expression of what we experience. There's aspects of it that sound different, but that's because our lives changed between releases, so then we just wrote about what was honest, and we rolled with it."

Flora Cash's musical style has been variously described as melancholic and bittersweet as well as somber and uplifting.

Lyrically, the pair have often drawn upon their own relationship for inspiration, and they often touch upon themes such as coping with mental health issues, government and social corruption, and coming to terms with oneself.

== Television ==
On August 9, 2018, Flora Cash performed "You're Somebody Else" on The Late Late Show with James Corden, marking their television debut.

On February 28, 2019, Flora Cash performed "You're Somebody Else" on Live with Kelly and Ryan, marking their first live television performance.

Their composition "Save Me" was also featured as the closing track on the final episode of series 3 of the Australian drama series Janet King.

Season 3, episode 2 of the series The Good Doctor features "You're Somebody Else" at the end of the episode montage sequence.

Hulu's miniseries adaptation of Four Weddings and a Funeral, season 1, episode 6, "Lights, Cameras, Wedding", features "And Ever" from the album Can Summer Love Last Forever?.

On January 5, 2020, the duo performed and was interviewed live on Sweden's morning TV program Nyhetsmorgon. They performed "You're Somebody Else" and "You Love Me."

The German teen drama web series Druck features "You're Somebody Else" in the final scene of season 3, episode 7.

Season 1, episode 7 of the series Locke & Key features "You're Somebody Else" at the end of the episode montage sequence.

On May 2, 2021, Flora Cash performed and was interviewed on Nyhetsmorgon live for the second time. They performed "The Bright Lights" and "Soul Mate", from their latest record, Our Generation.

== Touring ==
In 2018, Flora Cash toured the U.S., sharing the stage with Amen Dunes, Aquilo, SYML, and Superorganism.

Between late 2018 and late 2019, the duo toured with Sir Sly, Joywave, lovelytheband, Judah & the Lion, and AJR .

They announced their first U.S. headlining tour in late 2019 for early 2020, called the Baby, It's Okay tour. It sold out within several days but was subsequently cancelled due to the outbreak of the COVID-19 pandemic.

== Pompeys Pillar ==
In late 2013, after cutting their honeymoon short due to the discovery by Lleshaj of a suspicious lump on her breast, the pair made the drive back from California to Minnesota so that she could receive an examination there. En route, on October 10, Randall inscribed his and Lleshaj's name on Pompeys Pillar, a 150 ft.-tall sedimentary rock formation best known for bearing the signature of Captain William Clark. Before the site was designated a national monument in 2001 and placed under the jurisdiction of the Bureau of Land Management, Pompeys Pillar was visited by hundreds of people who, over many generations, had left their marks upon the rock. The inscription made by Randall was on a small section of unmarked limestone about three feet from the glass-encased signature of William Clark.

Randall publicly apologized shortly after the incident, stating that Lleshaj was undergoing a breast cancer scare at the time and that he saw the carving as a way to memorialize her in the event that the worst-case scenario came to pass. He is quoted as saying, "I read the sign that explained why this place was significant and was utterly inspired by the last part of the description, which read, 'for generations, Americans passing by this place have left their marks upon the rocks.'" He added, "I was motivated by the fact that maybe if something were to happen to my wife, I could come back to this place years from now and see hers and my name together". Randall was charged with misdemeanor vandalism and agreed to pay restitution and a fine, though whether his inscription could be successfully hidden was unclear. The etching was not deep enough to use a composite material to fill in, so it was instead masked using paint materials. Randall wrote in an email to the BLM and media outlets the following November, "...to the people of Montana and to every American who was affected by my foolishness, I hope you can find it in your heart to forgive me for this and realize that I understand the gravity of my mistake."

== Discography ==
=== Studio albums ===
- Nothing Lasts Forever (And It's Fine) (2017)
- Baby, It's Okay (2020)
- Our Generation (2021)
- behind every beautiful thing (2024)

=== Mini-albums ===
- Can Summer Love Last Forever? (2016)

=== EPs ===
- Mighty Fine (2012)
- Made It for You (2013)
- I Will Be There (2014)
- Nightmare + Remixes (2016)
- Press (2019)
- Don't You Look at Me That Way (2021)
- Chronically Beautiful (2021)
- Vår Pil (Piano Quintet för Rocker Peggy) (2023)
- Baby I Love You (2024)
- Like No One Could (2024)
- Morning Comes (2024)
- My Ex Would've Left by Now (2024)
- Just Wanna Feel You (2024)
- Is It Real? (2025)
- Heaven Will Have to Wait (2025)
- Complicated (2025)
- I'll Pray for You (2025)
- Moments of Glory (2026)
- The Power (2026)

=== Singles ===
- "Summerset" (2013)
- "Freakin' Love" (2013)
- "In the Winter" (2015)
- "For Someone" (2016)
- "Pharaoh" (2016)
- "Sadness Is Taking Over" (2016)
- "Nothing Lasts Forever (And It's Fine)" (2017)
- "California" (2017)
- "Roses on Your Dress" (2017)
- "18 Dollars" (2018)
- "You're Somebody Else" (2018)
- "They Own This Town" (2019)
- "Missing Home" (2019)
- "Born in the Slumber" (2019)
- "You Love Me" (2020)
- "Honey Go Home" (2020)
- "Feeling So Down" (2021)
- "The Bright Lights" (2021)
- "Soul Mate" (2021)
- "Don't You Look at Me That Way" (2021)
- "Chronically Beautiful" (2021)
- "We Used to Laugh / 9 to 9" (2021)
- "A Good Childhood" (2021)
- "Over" (2022)
- "I'm Tired" (2023)
- "Holy Water" (2023)
- "Dragon" (2024)
