= Bernice, Nevada =

- Ghost town
- Location within Nevada Location within the United States
- Coordinates: 39°45′30″N 117°46′53″W
- Country: United States
- State: Nevada
- County: Churchill
- Elevation: 4,944 ft (1,507 m)
- GNIS feature ID: 0854857

Bernice is a ghost town in Churchill County, in the U.S. state of Nevada. It was approximately 20 miles (32 km) northeast of Dixie Valley.

== History ==
Variant names were "Casket" and "Caskett". A post office called Casket was established in 1882, the name was changed to Bernice in 1883, and the post office closed in 1894. Different dates are given in Gamett & Paher, as cited by the GNIS, which states that the post office was called Casket from June 1882 until January 1883 and then Bernice from July 1883 to June 1884. According to tradition, "Bernice" was the name of a miner's love interest.
