= Laporte, Pennsylvania =

Borough in Pennsylvania, US

- Borough
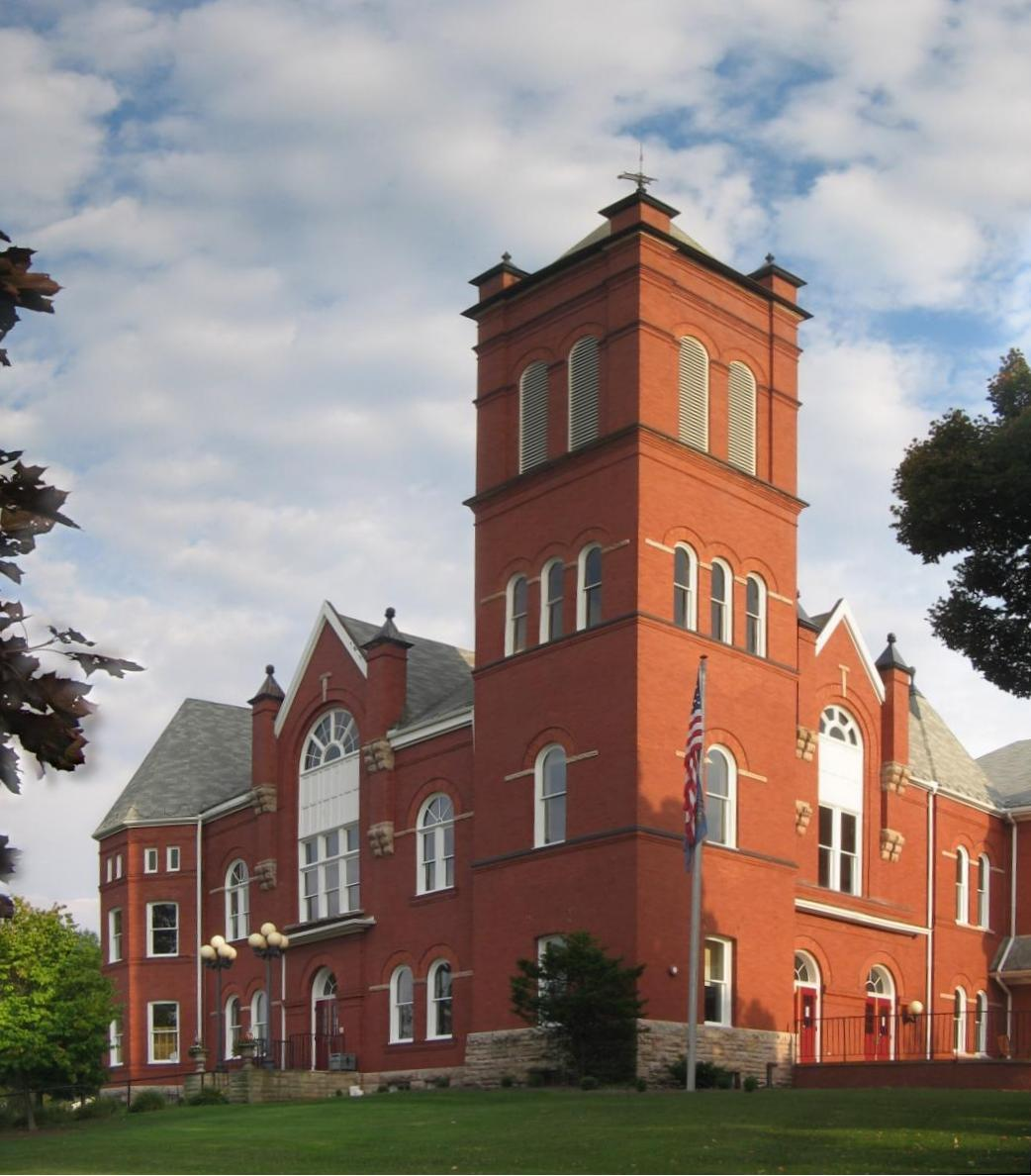
- The Sullivan County Courthouse, built 1894, in Laporte

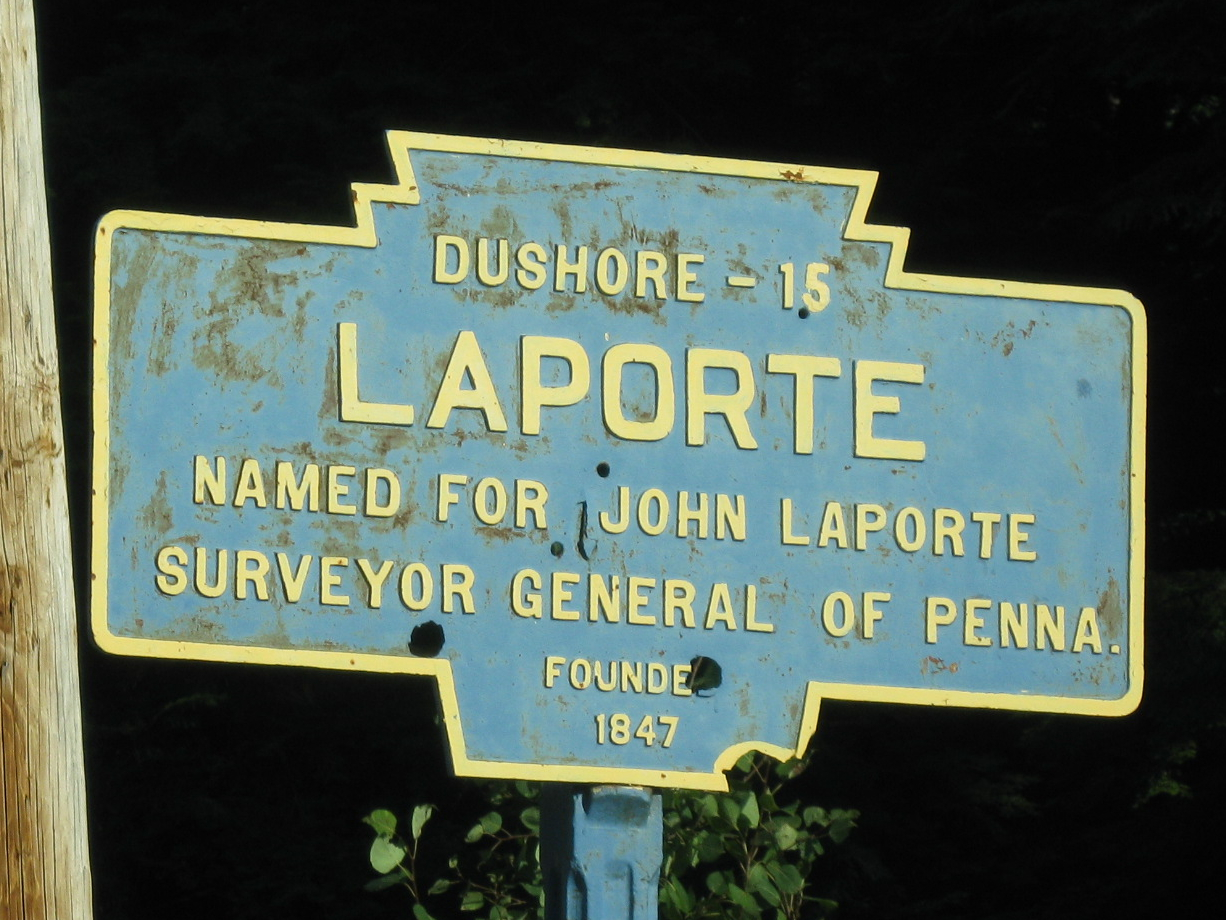
- Keystone Marker

- Location of Laporte in Sullivan County, Pennsylvania.

- Location within the U.S. state of Pennsylvania Laporte (the United States)
- Coordinates: 41°25′24″N 76°29′27″W
- Country: United States
- State: Pennsylvania
- County: Sullivan
- Settled: 1850
- Incorporated (borough): 1853

Area
  - Total: 1.23 sq mi (3.19 km^{2})
  - Land: 1.07 sq mi (2.76 km^{2})
  - Water: 0.16 sq mi (0.42 km^{2})
- Elevation: 1,972 ft (601 m)

Population (2020)
  - Total: 314
  - Density: 294.1/sq mi (113.56/km^{2})
- Time zone: Eastern (EST)
  - Summer (DST): EDT
- ZIP code: 18626
- Area code: 570 Exchange: 946
- FIPS code: 42-41512
- Website: www.laportepa.com

Laporte is a borough and the county seat of Sullivan County, Pennsylvania, United States. The population was 320 at the 2020 census. It is the county seat of Sullivan County. Laporte is surrounded by Laporte Township. It was named for John Laporte. It is the smallest county seat in Pennsylvania by population (as of the 2000 Census), and in 1969 was one of the two smallest in the United States.

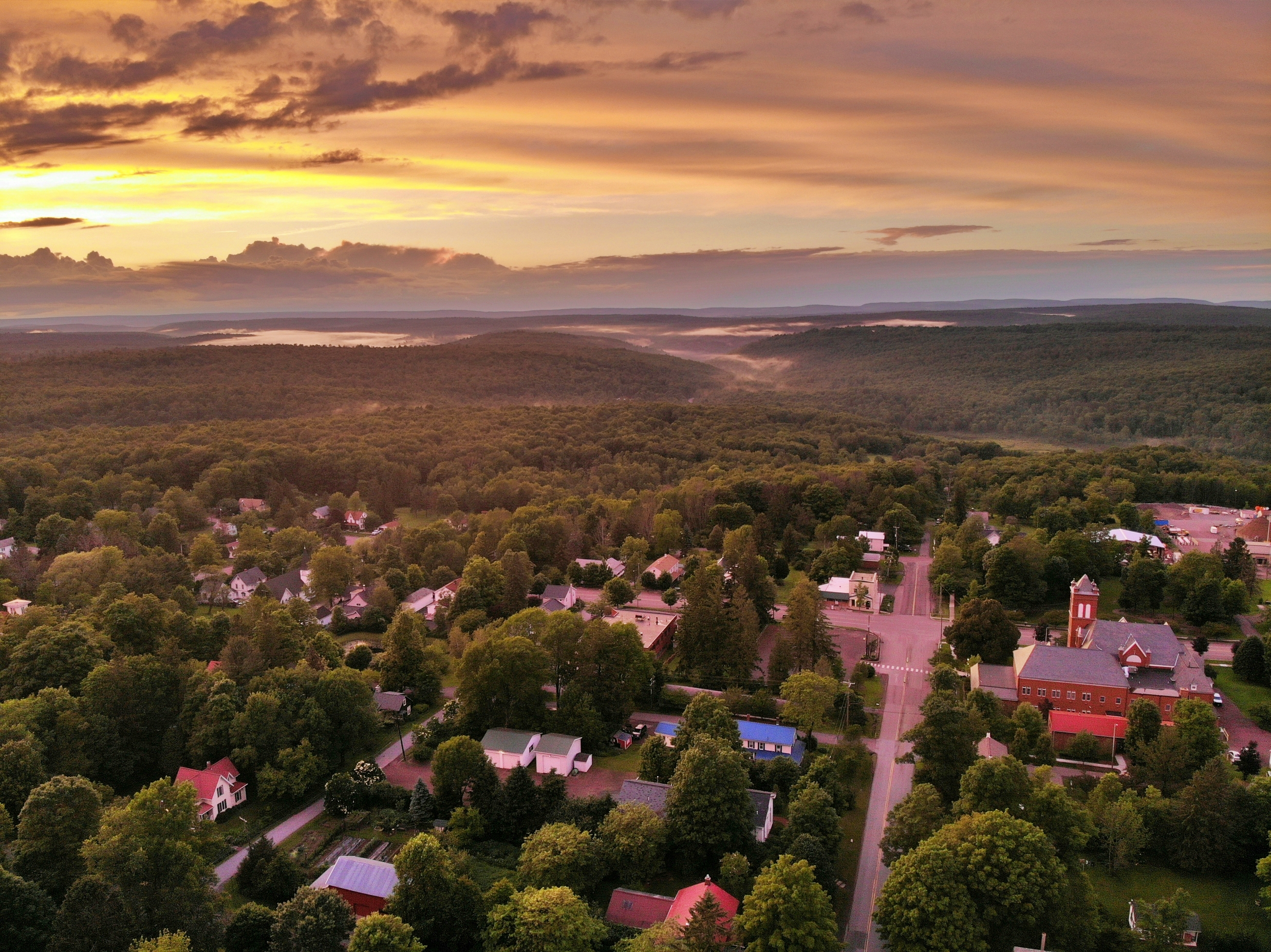
Overlooking Laporte at Sunset in June 2019

== History ==
The Pennsylvania Guide, compiled by the Writers' Program of the Works Progress Administration, described Laporte in 1940 as:

a mountain resort founded in 1847 and named for John Laporte, Surveyor General of Pennsylvania, [and] formerly a lumbering and tannery center. Wide verandas front many of the houses. Among the deeds preserved in the courthouse here is one recorded in 1864, which transfers the ownership of a large tract of land on a mountain plateau four miles west of Laporte to 'Almighty God.' The plateau was once the site of the Celestia Community of Adventists, founded in 1853 by Peter Armstrong and his wife. A small group of Adventists, interested in Armstrong's plan for communalism in preparation for the expected coming of the Lord, maintained the experiment for several years. Forced by hardships and the dissatisfactions of other members to abandon it, Armstrong returned to Philadelphia, after deeding the property to the Lord. Eventually the land was taken over by the county for unpaid taxes.

— Federal Writers' Project, "Part III: Tours", Pennsylvania: A Guide to the Keystone State (1940)

The Sullivan County Courthouse was added to the National Register of Historic Places in 1978.

== Geography ==
According to the United States Census Bureau, the borough has a total area of 1.3 square miles (3.4 km^{2}), of which 1.1 square miles (2.8 km^{2}) is land and 0.2 square miles (0.52 km^{2}) (12.50%) is water. Within the borough lies Lake Mokoma.

== Climate ==
Laporte has a humid continental climate (Köppen Dfb), with warm summers and cold, snowy winters.

Climate data for Laporte, Pennsylvania, 1991–2020 normals, extremes 1991–present
Month	Jan	Feb	Mar	Apr	May	Jun	Jul	Aug	Sep	Oct	Nov	Dec	Year
Record high °F (°C)	61 (16)	69 (21)	80 (27)	86 (30)	89 (32)	91 (33)	94 (34)	91 (33)	89 (32)	81 (27)	71 (22)	64 (18)	94 (34)
Mean maximum °F (°C)	52.8 (11.6)	51.3 (10.7)	62.2 (16.8)	75.4 (24.1)	82.3 (27.9)	85.4 (29.7)	86.8 (30.4)	84.6 (29.2)	81.7 (27.6)	73.0 (22.8)	63.3 (17.4)	54.0 (12.2)	88.4 (31.3)
Mean daily maximum °F (°C)	29.2 (−1.6)	31.7 (−0.2)	39.9 (4.4)	53.7 (12.1)	65.1 (18.4)	73.0 (22.8)	77.6 (25.3)	75.4 (24.1)	68.3 (20.2)	56.2 (13.4)	44.1 (6.7)	33.9 (1.1)	54.0 (12.2)
Daily mean °F (°C)	21.5 (−5.8)	23.2 (−4.9)	31.1 (−0.5)	43.4 (6.3)	54.7 (12.6)	63.3 (17.4)	67.7 (19.8)	65.8 (18.8)	58.6 (14.8)	47.2 (8.4)	36.5 (2.5)	27.1 (−2.7)	45.0 (7.2)
Mean daily minimum °F (°C)	13.9 (−10.1)	14.7 (−9.6)	22.2 (−5.4)	33.2 (0.7)	44.4 (6.9)	53.5 (11.9)	57.6 (14.2)	56.2 (13.4)	48.9 (9.4)	38.3 (3.5)	28.9 (−1.7)	20.2 (−6.6)	36.0 (2.2)
Mean minimum °F (°C)	−2.9 (−19.4)	−1.4 (−18.6)	5.5 (−14.7)	20.9 (−6.2)	31.9 (−0.1)	41.8 (5.4)	48.6 (9.2)	46.9 (8.3)	37.2 (2.9)	26.9 (−2.8)	15.2 (−9.3)	5.6 (−14.7)	−5.5 (−20.8)
Record low °F (°C)	−12 (−24)	−12 (−24)	−7 (−22)	11 (−12)	12 (−11)	36 (2)	44 (7)	41 (5)	27 (−3)	19 (−7)	2 (−17)	−9 (−23)	−12 (−24)
Average precipitation inches (mm)	4.49 (114)	3.08 (78)	3.77 (96)	4.21 (107)	4.61 (117)	4.67 (119)	5.28 (134)	5.05 (128)	5.25 (133)	4.63 (118)	3.82 (97)	4.41 (112)	53.27 (1,353)
Average snowfall inches (cm)	19.9 (51)	17.1 (43)	11.2 (28)	3.1 (7.9)	0.0 (0.0)	0.0 (0.0)	0.0 (0.0)	0.0 (0.0)	0.0 (0.0)	0.9 (2.3)	5.0 (13)	12.5 (32)	69.7 (177.2)
Average extreme snow depth inches (cm)	11.3 (29)	12.1 (31)	8.8 (22)	2.1 (5.3)	0.1 (0.25)	0.0 (0.0)	0.0 (0.0)	0.0 (0.0)	0.0 (0.0)	0.6 (1.5)	3.0 (7.6)	7.0 (18)	17.8 (45)
Average precipitation days (≥ 0.01 in)	16.4	14.2	13.7	13.8	14.4	14.6	12.5	12.0	11.2	12.4	12.3	15.5	163.0
Average snowy days (≥ 0.1 in)	9.0	7.8	6.0	1.5	0.1	0.0	0.0	0.0	0.0	0.4	2.7	6.5	34.0
Source 1: NOAA
Source 2: National Weather Service

== Demographics ==
Historical population
Census	Pop.	Note	%±
1860	208		—
1870	145		−30.3%
1880	192		32.4%
1890	443		130.7%
1900	465		5.0%
1910	245		−47.3%
1920	175		−28.6%
1930	163		−6.9%
1940	206		26.4%
1950	199		−3.4%
1960	195		−2.0%
1970	207		6.2%
1980	230		11.1%
1990	328		42.6%
2000	290		−11.6%
2010	316		9.0%
2020	314		−0.6%
2021 (est.)	321	▲	2.2%

At the 2010 census, there were 316 people, 109 households, and 67 families residing in the borough. The population density was 287.3 inhabitants per square mile (110.9/km^{2}). There were 251 housing units at an average density of 228.2 per square mile (88.1/km^{2}). The racial makeup of the borough was 98.1% White, 0.6% African American, 0.9% Native American, and 0.3% Asian. Hispanics or Latinos of any race makes up 0.9% of the borough population.

Of the 109 households, 14.7% had children under the age of 18 living with them, 54.1% were married couples living together, 3.7% had a female householder with no husband present, and 38.5% were non-families. 34.9% of households were one person, and 22% were one person aged 65 or older. The average household size was 2.01 and the average family size was 2.54.

In the borough the population was spread out, with 8.5% under the age of 18, 49.1% from 18 to 64, and 42.4% 65 or older. The median age was 61.7 years.

The median household income was $43,750 and the median family income was $52,500. Males had a median income of $30,625 versus $25,500 for females. The per capita income for the borough was $18,762. About 3.6% of families and 7.4% of the population were below the poverty line, including 10.9% of those under the age of eighteen and none of those 65 or over.
