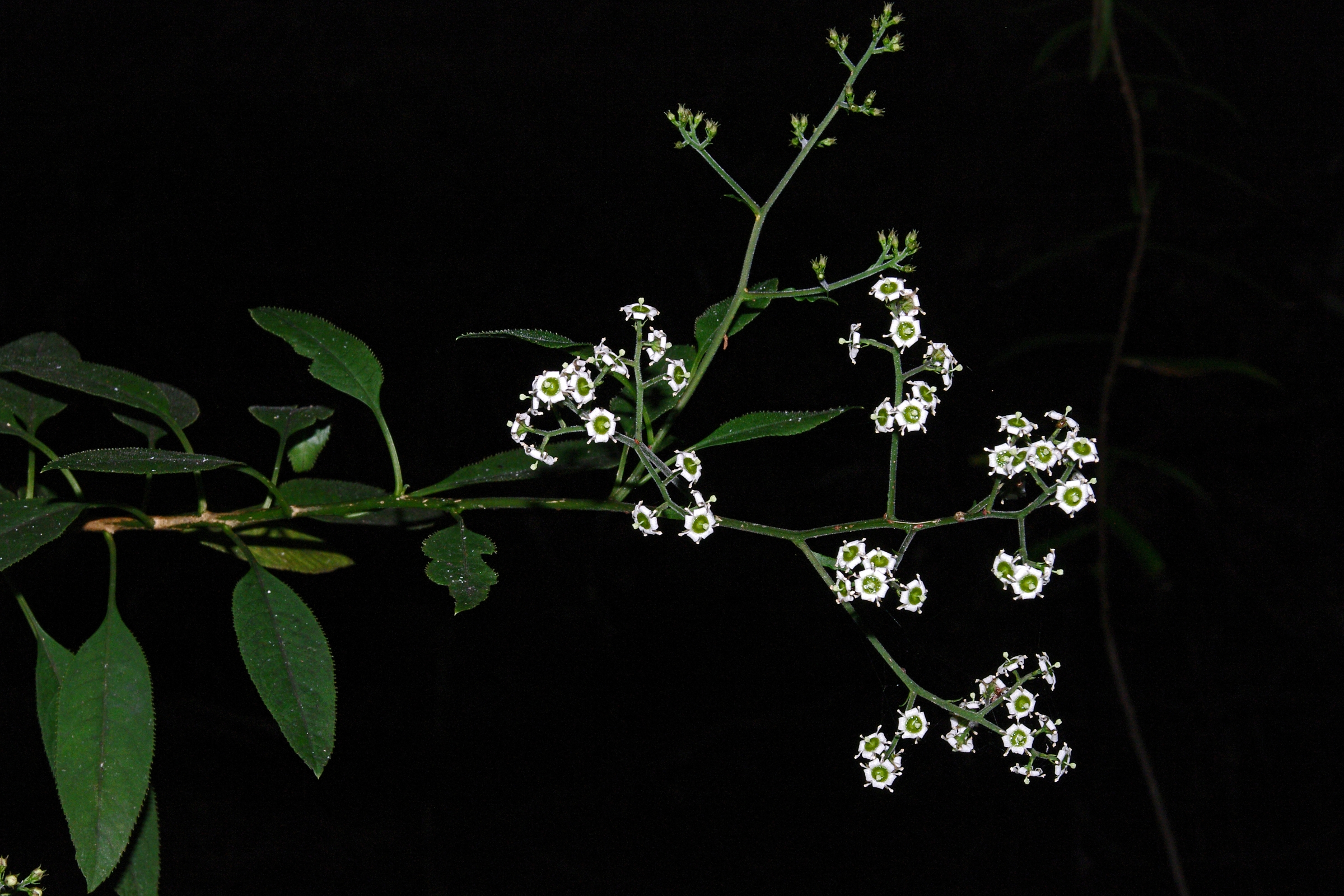

Scientific classification
- Kingdom: Plantae
- Clade: Tracheophytes
- Clade: Angiosperms
- Clade: Eudicots
- Clade: Asterids
- Order: Asterales
- Family: Campanulaceae
- Subfamily: Campanuloideae
- Genus: Berenice; Tul.
- Species: B. arguta

Binomial name
- Berenice arguta Tul.

= Berenice arguta =

Species of flowering plant

Berenice is a genus of plants in the Campanulaceae family. There is only one described species, Berenice arguta, endemic to the island of Réunion in the Indian Ocean.

== Description ==
Berenice arguta is a subshrub or shrub that grows primarily in wet, tropical locations.
