= Bernice Coalfield =

Coalfield in Sullivan County, Pennsylvania, United States

Coordinates: 41°30′N 76°20′W

The Bernice Coalfield is located in Cherry and Colley Townships in Sullivan County, Pennsylvania.

== Geography ==
The villages of Mildred, Lopez, Murraytown and Bernice surround the Bernice Coalfield.

"The Bernice coal basin points out eastward on the plateau, east of Pigeon creek," according to Andrew Sherwood, and "occupies the summit of the dividing ridge between Birch creek and the Loyalsock." "The Bernice synclinal axis passes through the southern part" of Forks Township, "south of Forksville, where a small area of the lowest coal bed has been preserved," while the "Bernice coal trough passes through the northern end of" Shrewsbury Township.

== History ==
Semi-anthracite coal was the primary type of coal that was extracted from the Bernice Coalfield. Both strip mining and deep mining operations were conducted here.

According to Sherwood, the anthracite coal extracted from the Bernice fields in 1880 differed significantly from anthracite coal extracted elsewhere in Pennsylvania. It had "a dull lustre, instead of the well-known shining lustre of the other anthracites, and it entirely lack[ed] the conchoidal fracture which [was] possessed by every other Pennsylvania anthracite." It could not "be passed through an ordinary anthracite breaker. Such a breaker would so crush it as to leave little beside slack and pea coal."

The Bernice breaker consisted of "a massive plate, fitted with iron teeth," which replaced the crushers that were standard in other anthracite breakers. The "plate, in descending, [struck] the coal lumps ...easily [splitting] the lumps into pieces of varying size, and practically turn[ed] out about the same portion of the various sizes of coal (and with no more wastage) as the average at collieries in the anthracite regions" in 1880, according to Sherwood.
