= Comeherefloyd =

Mp3 blog

comeherefloyd
- The comeherefloyd logo
- Formation: 2017
- Type: MP3 blog
- Location: New Jersey, U.S.
- Official language: English
- Website: http://comeherefloyd.com

comeherefloyd is an mp3 blog based in New Jersey founded in 2017.

== History ==
New Jersey–based mp3 blog comeherefloyd has premiered songs and music videos for a variety of artists. The company has stated that "most of the time our attention concentrates on Indie-Pop, Indie-Rock, [and] Korean Indie-Pop."

In 2019, Earmilk shared details of comeherefloyd's exclusive interview with American songwriter Waldo Witt.

== Contributors ==
In 2018, New Jersey music critic Tris McCall began writing for comeherefloyd.
