= List of covered bridges on the National Register of Historic Places in Pennsylvania =

Pine Valley Covered Bridge

This is a list of covered bridges on the National Register of Historic Places in the U.S. state of Pennsylvania. Other bridges and tunnels on the National Register of Historic Places in Pennsylvania are listed elsewhere.

In the early 1800s, the first covered bridge in the United States was constructed by Timothy Palmer crossing the Schuylkill River at 30th Street in Philadelphia. This new bridge type, wooden with a covered span, was developed because traditional European methods, typically stone bridges, were not appropriate for the harsh Pennsylvania winters. Many of the bridges were named for pioneer families residing near the bridges.

Some people call Pennsylvania the "Covered Bridge Capital of the Nation".

== Current listings ==
Name	Image	Built	Listed	Location	County	Type
Academia Pomeroy Covered Bridge	Academia Pomeroy Covered Bridge	1902	August 10, 1979	Spruce Hill; 40°29′37″N 77°28′21″W	Juniata	Covered Burr truss
Adairs Covered Bridge	Adairs Bridge	1864, 1919	August 25, 1980	Kistler; 40°20′29″N 77°25′27″W	Perry	Covered Burr truss
Aline Covered Bridge	Aline Covered Bridge	1884	August 10, 1979	Meiserville; 40°40′35″N 76°58′46″W	Snyder	Covered Burr truss arch
Bailey Covered Bridge	Bailey Covered Bridge	1889	June 22, 1979	Prosperity; 40°1′14″N 80°11′45″W	Washington	Covered Burr arch
Banks Covered Bridge	Banks Covered Bridge	1889	June 27, 1980	New Wilmington; 41°5′26″N 80°17′10″W	Lawrence	Covered Burr arch truss
Barronvale Bridge		1902	December 11, 1980	Somerset; 39°57′10″N 79°16′14″W	Somerset	Covered Burr arch
Bartram's Covered Bridge		1860	December 10, 1980	Newtown Square; 39°59′23″N 75°26′15″W	Chester, Delaware	Covered Burr truss
Baumgardner's Mill Covered Bridge		1860	December 11, 1980	Willow Street; 39°55′50″N 76°17′44″W	Lancaster	Covered Burr arch
Beechdale Bridge		1870	December 10, 1980	Berlin; 39°52′54″N 79°2′5″W	Somerset	Covered Burr arch
Bells Mills Covered Bridge	Bells Mills Covered Bridge	1850	June 27, 1980	Yukon; 40°13′9″N 79°42′37″W	Westmoreland	
Bistline Covered Bridge		1871	August 25, 1980	Blain; 40°20′2″N 77°28′14″W	Perry	Covered Burr truss
Bitzer's Mill Covered Bridge		1846	December 11, 1980	Ephrata; 40°8′25″N 76°9′8″W	Lancaster	Covered Burr arch
Bogert Covered Bridge		1841	December 1, 1980	Allentown; 40°34′8″N 75°30′17″W	Lehigh	Covered Burr truss
Book's Covered Bridge	Book's Covered Bridge	1884	August 25, 1980	Blain; 40°19′28″N 77°31′29″W	Perry	Covered Burr truss
Gottlieb Brown Covered Bridge		1881	August 8, 1979	Mooresburg, Potts Grove; 41°0′6″N 76°46′26″W	Montour, Northumberland	Covered Burr arch
Scott Brownlee Covered Bridge			June 22, 1979	West Finley; 40°2′38″N 80°23′53″W	Washington	Covered kingpost truss
Buck Hill Farm Covered Bridge		1844	December 10, 1980	Lititz; 40°7′55″N 76°18′3″W	Lancaster	Covered Burr arch
Bucher's Mill Covered Bridge		1881	December 11, 1980	Denver; 40°12′28″N 76°8′5″W	Lancaster	Covered Burr arch
Buttonwood Covered Bridge		1898	July 24, 1980	Liberty; 41°30′35″N 77°7′50″W	Lycoming	Covered Burr arch
Cabin Run Covered Bridge	Cabin Run Covered Bridge	1874	December 1, 1980	Point Pleasant; 40°14′33″N 75°6′45″W	Bucks	Covered Town truss
Carmichaels Covered Bridge	Carmichaels Covered Bridge	1889	June 22, 1979	Carmichael; 39°53′46″N 79°57′33″W	Greene	Covered queenpost truss
Cogan House Covered Bridge		1877	July 24, 1980	Cogan House; 41°23′53″N 77°12′4″W	Lycoming	Covered Burr arch
Colemanville Covered Bridge		1856	December 11, 1980	Pequea; 39°53′55″N 76°20′32″W	Lancaster	Covered Burr arch
Crawford Covered Bridge			June 22, 1979	West Finley; 40°0′8″N 80°28′20″W	Washington	Covered queenpost truss
Creasyville Covered Bridge		1881	November 29, 1979	Millville; 41°12′43″N 76°27′42″W	Columbia	Covered queen post truss
Danley Covered Bridge			June 22, 1979	West Finley; 40°3′18″N 80°26′22″W	Washington	Covered queenpost truss
Davis Covered Bridge		1850	November 29, 1979	Catawissa; 40°54′40″N 76°26′24″W	Columbia	Covered Burr truss-arch
Horn Davis Overholtzer Bridge		1889	June 22, 1979	Fairfield, North Fredericktown; 40°0′29″N 80°3′45″W	Greene, Washington	Covered Burr arch
Day Covered Bridge	Day Covered Bridge	ca. 1875	June 22, 1979	Prosperity; 40°1′46″N 80°17′35″W	Washington	Covered queenpost truss
Dellville Covered Bridge	Dellville Covered Bridge	1889	August 25, 1980	Dellville; 40°21′49″N 77°7′0″W	Perry	Covered Burr truss
Devil's Den, McClurg Covered Bridge		1880	June 22, 1979	Hanover Township park in Hanover Township; 40°25′28.52″N 80°26′47.51″W	Washington	Covered kingpost truss
Diehls Covered Bridge	Diels Covered Bridge	1892	April 10, 1980	New Buena Vista; 40°0′34″N 78°38′55″W	Bedford	Covered
Dimmsville Covered Bridge	Dimmsville Covered Bridge	1902	August 10, 1979	Dimmsville; 40°36′23″N 77°8′20″W	Juniata	Covered Burr truss
Dreese's Covered Bridge	Dreese's Covered Bridge	ca. 1870	August 10, 1979	Beavertown; 40°46′31″N 77°8′42″W	Snyder	Covered Burr arch
Dreibelbis Station Bridge	Dreibelbis Station Bridge	1869	February 23, 1981	Lenhartsville; 40°33′17″N 75°52′48″W	Berks	Covered Burr arch truss
East Oriental Covered Bridge		1907	August 10, 1979	Meiserville, Oriental; 40°38′20″N 77°0′5″W	Juniata, Snyder	Covered Burr truss
Ebenezer Covered Bridge		Unknown	June 22, 1979	Ginger Hill; 40°11′28″N 80°2′28″W	Washington	Covered queenpost truss
Sam Eckman Covered Bridge No. 92		1876	November 29, 1979	Millville; 41°10′39″N 76°29′26″W	Columbia	Covered Warren truss
Erb's Covered Bridge		1887	December 10, 1980	Rothsville; 40°10′3″N 76°14′39″W	Lancaster	Covered Burr arch
Erskine Covered Bridge		1845	June 22, 1979	West Alexander; 40°3′59″N 80°30′59″W	Washington	Covered queenpost truss
Erwinna Covered Bridge	Erwinna Covered Bridge	1871	December 1, 1980	Erwinna; 40°30′9″N 75°4′29″W	Bucks	Covered Town truss
Factory Bridge		1880	February 8, 1980	White Deer; 41°4′25″N 76°54′12″W	Union	Covered king & queen trusses
Feltons Mill Covered Bridge	Feltons Mill Covered Bridge	1892	April 10, 1980	Bedford; 39°58′22″N 78°17′20″W	Bedford	Covered
Fischtner Covered Bridge		1880	April 10, 1980	Stringtown; 39°45′49″N 78°45′6″W	Bedford	Covered
Fleisher Covered Bridge	Fleisher Covered Bridge	1887	August 25, 1980	Newport; 40°29′22″N 77°9′31″W	Perry	Covered Burr truss
Forksville Covered Bridge		1850	July 24, 1980	Forksville; 41°29′18″N 76°36′0″W	Sullivan	Covered Burr arch
Forry's Mill Covered Bridge		1869	December 11, 1980	Columbia; 40°3′59″N 76°28′42″W	Lancaster	Covered Burr arch
Fowlersville Covered Bridge		1886	November 29, 1979	Fowlersville; 41°3′19″N 76°19′39″W	Columbia	Covered queen post truss
Frankenfield Covered Bridge	Frankenfield Covered Bridge	1832	December 1, 1980	Point Pleasant; 40°28′32″N 75°5′59″W	Bucks	Covered Town truss
Furnace Covered Bridge No. 11		1882	November 29, 1979	Esther; 40°54′24″N 76°27′37″W	Columbia	Covered queen post truss
Geiger Covered Bridge	Geiger's Bridge	1860	December 1, 1980	Orefield; 40°38′46″N 75°37′0″W	Lehigh	Covered Burr truss
Gibson's Covered Bridge		1872	December 10, 1980	Downingtown; 39°58′34″N 75°41′0″W	Chester	Covered Burr truss
Glen Hope Covered Bridge		1889	December 10, 1980	West Grove; 39°43′37″N 75°54′28″W	Chester	Covered Burr truss
Glessner Bridge	Glessner Covered Bridge	1881	December 10, 1980	Shanksville; 40°1′33″N 78°55′16″W	Somerset	Covered multiple kingpost truss
Griesemer's Mill Bridge	Griesemer's Mill Bridge	1832	February 23, 1981	Oley; 40°21′46″N 75°44′18″W	Berks	Covered Burr truss
Grimes Covered Bridge		1888	June 22, 1979	Waynesburg; 39°57′16″N 80°9′35″W	Greene	Covered kingpost truss
Gross Bridge		ca. 1878	August 29, 1977	Beavertown; 40°45′6″N 77°13′24″W	Snyder	Covered Burr arch
Gudgeonville Covered Bridge		1868	September 17, 1980	Girard; 41°58′54″N 80°15′58″W	Erie	Covered multiple kingpost truss
Hall's Bridge		ca. 1850	April 23, 1973	Chester Springs; 40°8′51″N 75°37′15″W	Chester	Covered Burr truss
Halls Mill Covered Bridge	Halls Mill Covered Bridge	1872	April 10, 1980	Hopewell; 40°7′27″N 78°19′2″W	Bedford	Covered
Harmon's Covered Bridge		1910	August 3, 1979	Willet; 40°42′48″N 79°4′53″W	Indiana	Covered Town truss
Harrington Covered Bridge		ca. 1870	September 17, 1980	Albion; 41°52′8″N 80°25′45″W	Erie	Covered kingpost truss
Hassenplug Bridge	Hassenplug Covered Bridge	1825	February 8, 1980	Mifflinburg; 40°55′25″N 77°3′0″W	Union	Covered Burr truss
Hayes Bridge	Hayes Covered Bridge	1882	February 8, 1980	Mifflinburg; 40°55′34″N 77°5′32″W	Union	Covered king truss
Hays Bridge Historic District	Hays Bridge Historic District	1883	July 31, 1978	Mercersburg; 39°47′19″N 77°51′15″W	Franklin	Covered Burr truss
Heikes Covered Bridge		1892	August 25, 1980	Heidlersburg; 39°58′41″N 77°8′47″W	Adams	Covered Burr truss
Heirline Covered Bridge	Heirline Covered Bridge	1902	April 10, 1980	Manns Choice; 40°1′0″N 78°35′37″W	Bedford	Covered
Henniger Farm Covered Bridge		ca. 1850	December 18, 1978	Elizabethville; 40°34′38″N 76°47′3″W	Dauphin	Burr & double-arch truss
Henry Covered Bridge		ca. 1881	June 22, 1979	Monongahela; 40°12′8″N 80°1′1″W	Washington	Covered queenpost truss
Herr's Mill Covered Bridge		1885	December 10, 1980	Soundersbury; 40°0′35″N 76°9′44″W	Lancaster	Covered Burr arch
Hewitt Covered Bridge	Hewitt Covered Bridge	1879	April 10, 1980	Hewitt; 39°45′16″N 78°30′40″W	Bedford	Covered
Hillsgrove Covered Bridge		ca. 1850	July 2, 1973	Hillsgrove; 41°27′39″N 76°40′17″W	Sullivan	Covered arch truss
Himmel's Church Covered Bridge		1874	August 8, 1979	Rebuck; 40°43′23″N 76°43′12″W	Northumberland	Covered multiple kingpost truss
Hollingshead Covered Bridge No. 40		1850	November 29, 1979	Catawissa; 40°57′6″N 76°26′52″W	Columbia	Covered Burr arch
Hughes Covered Bridge		1889	June 22, 1979	Prosperity; 40°1′59″N 80°9′37″W	Washington	Covered queenpost truss
Jacks Mountain Covered Bridge	Jacks Mountain Covered Bridge	1890	August 25, 1980	Iron Springs; 39°46′1″N 77°23′13″W	Adams	Covered Burr truss
Jacksons Mill Covered Bridge	Jackson's Mill Covered Bridge	1889	April 10, 1980	Bedford; 39°58′16″N 78°16′19″W	Bedford	Covered
Jackson's Mill Covered Bridge			June 22, 1979	Kings Creek Road spanning Kings Creek in Hanover Township, northwest of Burgettstown; 40°25′26.08″N 80°29′21.3″W	Washington	Covered queenpost truss
Johnson Covered Bridge No. 28		1882	November 29, 1979	Catawissa; 40°52′40″N 76°29′2″W	Columbia	Covered Warren truss
Josiah Hess Covered Bridge No. 122		1875	November 29, 1979	Forks; 41°6′53″N 76°20′23″W	Columbia	Covered Burr truss-arch
Jud Christie Covered Bridge No. 95		1876	November 29, 1979	Millville; 41°11′45″N 76°28′24″W	Columbia	Covered queen post truss
Kaufman's Distillery Covered Bridge		1874	December 11, 1980	Manheim; 40°8′53″N 76°24′37″W	Lancaster	Covered Burr arch
Keefer Covered Bridge No. 7		1853	November 29, 1979	Washingtonville; 41°1′59″N 76°41′31″W	Montour	Covered Burr arch
Keefer Station Covered Bridge		1888	August 8, 1979	Sunbury; 40°52′14″N 76°43′25″W	Northumberland	Covered Burr arch
Keller's Covered Bridge		1873	December 10, 1980	Ephrata Township; 40°9′51″N 76°13′57″W	Lancaster	Covered Burr arch
Kennedy Bridge		1856	January 21, 1974	Kimberton; 40°8′25″N 75°34′36″W	Chester	Covered Burr truss
Kidd's Mills Covered Bridge Historic District	Kidd's Mills Covered Bridge	1868	December 2, 1974	Greenville	Mercer	Covered Smith cross truss
King Covered Bridge		1890	June 22, 1979	Kuhntown; 39°45′25″N 80°16′21″W	Greene	Covered queenpost truss
King's Bridge	King's Bridge	1857, 1906	December 11, 1980	Somerset; 39°56′15″N 79°16′17″W	Somerset	Covered kingpost truss
Kintersburg Covered Bridge	Kintersburg Covered Bridge	1877	August 3, 1979	Kintersburg; 40°42′48.7″N 79°4′52.3″W	Indiana	Covered Howe truss
Knapp's Covered Bridge	Knapp's Covered Bridge	1853	July 24, 1980	Burlington; 41°47′9″N 76°33′13″W	Bradford	Covered Burr truss
Knecht's Mill Covered Bridge	Knecht's Mill Covered Bridge	1873	December 1, 1980	Springtown; 40°34′11″N 75°15′4″W	Bucks	Covered Town truss
Knox Covered Bridge in Valley Forge National Historical Park		1865	October 15, 1966	Valley Forge State Park; 40°5′14″N 75°27′22″W	Chester	Covered Burr truss
Dr. Knisley Covered Bridge		1867	April 10, 1980	Alum Bank; 40°9′36″N 78°36′8″W	Bedford	Covered
Lawrence L. Knoebel Covered Bridge	Lawrence L. Knoebel Covered Bridge	1875, 1935, 1937	August 8, 1979	Knoebels Amusement Resort; 40°52′38″N 76°30′21″W	Northumberland	Covered modified queenpost truss
Kochendefer Covered Bridge	Kochendefer Covered Bridge	1919	August 25, 1980	Saville; 40°25′27″N 77°23′15″W	Perry	Covered modified king, queen
Kramer Covered Bridge No. 113		1881	November 29, 1979	Rohrsburg; 41°7′16″N 76°25′56″W	Columbia	Covered queen post truss
Kreidersville Covered Bridge	Kreidersville Covered Bridge	1840	December 1, 1980	Kreidersville; 40°43′25″N 75°29′35″W	Northampton	Covered Burr arch truss
Kreigbaum Covered Bridge		1876	August 8, 1979	Elysburg, Numidia; 40°50′51″N 76°30′29″W	Columbia, Northumberland	Covered queenpost truss
Krepps Covered Bridge			June 22, 1979	Midway; 40°20′26″N 80°19′53″W	Washington	Covered kingpost truss
Kutz's Mill Bridge		1854	February 23, 1981	Kutztown; 40°32′4″N 75°48′21″W	Berks	Covered Burr truss
Lairdsville Covered Bridge		1888	July 24, 1980	Hughesville; 41°12′26″N 76°38′10″W	Lycoming	Covered Burr arch
Landis Mill Covered Bridge		1878	December 10, 1980	Lancaster; 40°4′6″N 76°20′43″W	Lancaster	Covered king post truss
Larkin Covered Bridge		1881	December 10, 1980	Downingtown; 40°4′15″N 75°43′15″W	Chester	Covered Burr truss
Leaman Place Covered Bridge		1893	December 11, 1980	Intercourse; 40°0′44″N 76°6′30″W	Lancaster	Covered Burr arch
Leatherman Covered Bridge			June 22, 1979	Cokeburg; 40°20′26″N 80°19′53″W	Washington	Covered queenpost truss
Lehman's, Port Royal Covered Bridge		1888	August 10, 1979	Port Royal; 40°31′45″N 77°23′45″W	Juniata	Covered double Burr arch
Lime Valley Covered Bridge		1871	December 10, 1980	Refton; 39°57′38″N 76°14′6″W	Lancaster	Covered Burr arch
Lippincott Covered Bridge		1943	June 22, 1979	Waynesburg; 39°56′36″N 80°7′35″W	Greene	Covered kingpost truss
Little Gap Covered Bridge		ca. 1860	December 1, 1980	Little Gap; 40°49′52″N 75°31′22″W	Carbon	Covered Burr truss
Logan Mills Covered Bridge		1874	August 6, 1979	Loganton; 41°0′20″N 77°23′11″W	Clinton	Covered Queen post truss
Loux Covered Bridge	Loux Covered Bridge	1874	December 1, 1980	Pipersville; 40°25′21″N 75°7′41″W	Bucks	Covered Town truss
Lower Humbert Covered Bridge	Lower Humbert Bridge	1891	December 10, 1980	Ursina; 39°50′25″N 79°19′24″W	Somerset	Covered Burr arch
Lyle Covered Bridge		1887	June 22, 1979	Kramer Road spanning Brush Run in Hanover Township, north of Raccoon; 40°27′15.26″N 80°22′31.85″W	Washington	Covered queenpost truss
Manasses Guth Covered Bridge	Manasses Guth Covered Bridge	1858, 1882	December 1, 1980	Orefield; 40°37′42″N 75°33′13″W	Lehigh	Covered Burr arch truss
Martin's Mill Covered Bridge	Martin's Mill Covered Bridge	1849	February 15, 1974	Greencastle; 39°45′53″N 77°46′33″W	Franklin	Covered Town lattice truss
Martin's Mill Covered Bridge	Martin's Mill Covered Bridge	1888	June 22, 1979	Marianna; 40°0′49″N 80°7′54″W	Washington	Covered queenpost truss
Blaney Mays Covered Bridge		1882	June 22, 1979	Claysville; 40°5′17″N 80°29′15″W	Washington	Covered queenpost truss
McConnell's Mill Covered Bridge		1874	June 27, 1980	Slippery Rock Township; 40°57′10″N 80°10′14″W	Lawrence	Covered Howe truss
McGees Mills Covered Bridge	McGees Mills Covered Bridge	1873	April 17, 1980	Mahaffey; 40°52′48″N 78°45′55″W	Clearfield	Covered Burr truss
Mercer's Mill Covered Bridge		1880	December 11, 1980	Atglen, Christiana; 39°55′53″N 75°58′54″W	Chester, Lancaster	Covered Burr arch
Longdon L. Miller Covered Bridge			June 22, 1979	West Finley; 39°58′41″N 80°26′47″W	Washington	Covered queenpost truss
Millmont Red Bridge		1855	February 8, 1980	Millmont; 40°52′41″N 77°9′21″W	Union	Covered Burr truss
Mt. Pleasant Covered Bridge		1918	August 25, 1980	New Germantown; 40°18′54″N 77°32′44″W	Perry	Covered modified king, queen
Neff's Mill Covered Bridge		1875	December 11, 1980	Strasburg; 39°58′43″N 76°13′33″W	Lancaster	Covered Burr arch
New Baltimore Bridge		1879	December 10, 1980	New Baltimore; 39°59′13″N 78°46′21″W	Somerset	Covered queenpost truss
New Germantown Covered Bridge		1891	August 25, 1980	New Germantown; 40°18′24″N 77°34′6″W	Perry	Covered modified king, queen
New Paris Covered Bridge		1882	April 10, 1980	New Paris; 40°7′42″N 78°38′21″W	Bedford	Covered
North Oriental Covered Bridge		1908	August 10, 1979	Meiserville, Oriental; 40°39′42″N 77°0′41″W	Juniata, Snyder	Covered multiple kingpost truss
Osterburg Covered Bridge		1890	April 10, 1980	Osterburg; 40°10′37″N 78°32′30″W	Bedford	Covered
Packsaddle Bridge		1870	December 10, 1980	Glen Savage; 39°52′4″N 78°49′3″W	Somerset	Covered kingpost truss
Parr's Mill Covered Bridge No. 10		1865	November 29, 1979	Parr's Mill; 40°54′23″N 76°28′23″W	Columbia	Covered Burr truss-arch
Patterson Covered Bridge No. 112		1875	November 29, 1979	Orangeville; 41°6′34″N 76°25′3″W	Columbia	Covered Burr truss-arch
Pine Bank Covered Bridge		1871	June 22, 1979	Studa; 40°17′20″N 80°29′27″W	Washington	Covered kingpost truss
Pine Grove Covered Bridge		1884	December 11, 1980	Kirkwood, Oxford; 39°47′37″N 76°2′41″W	Chester, Lancaster	Covered Burr arch
Pine Valley Covered Bridge	Pine Valley Covered Bridge	1842	December 1, 1980	New Britain; 40°18′19″N 75°11′16″W	Bucks	Covered Town truss
Pinetown Covered Bridge		1867	December 11, 1980	Lancaster; 40°6′20″N 76°14′55″W	Lancaster	Covered Burr arch
Plant's Covered Bridge		1876	June 22, 1979	West Finley; 40°1′16″N 80°24′58″W	Washington	Covered kingpost truss
Pleasantville Bridge	Pleasantville Bridge	1852	February 23, 1981	Oley; 40°22′44″N 75°44′21″W	Berks	Covered Burr truss
Pool Forge Covered Bridge		1859	December 11, 1980	Churchtown; 40°8′27″N 76°0′0″W	Lancaster	Covered Burr arch
Ralston Freeman Covered Bridge		1915	June 22, 1979	North of Paris crossing Aunt Clara's Fork of King's Creek in Hanover Township; 40°26′49.19″N 80°30′25.64″W	Washington	Covered kingpost truss
Ramp Covered Bridge		1870	August 25, 1980	Newburg; 40°8′10″N 77°31′26″W	Cumberland	Covered Burr arch truss
Rapps Bridge		1866	June 18, 1973	Phoenixville; 40°8′17.7″N 75°33′10.3″W	Chester	Covered Burr truss
Red Covered Bridge		1886	August 25, 1980	Liverpool; 40°34′5″N 77°0′14″W	Perry	Covered modified king, queen
Red Run Covered Bridge		1866	December 11, 1980	Terre Hill; 40°10′32″N 76°4′55″W	Lancaster	Covered Burr arch
Rex Covered Bridge		1858	December 1, 1980	Orefield; 40°38′5″N 75°36′47″W	Lehigh	Covered Burr arch truss
Rice Covered Bridge		1869	August 25, 1980	Landisburg; 40°20′9″N 77°18′34″W	Perry	Covered Burr, queen post truss
Richards Covered Bridge		1840	August 8, 1979	Elysburg; 40°50′51″N 76°30′29″W	Northumberland	Covered multiple kingpost, queenpost
Riegel Covered Bridge No. 6		1870	November 29, 1979	Catawissa; 40°54′44″N 76°30′49″W	Columbia	Covered Burr arch
Rishel Covered Bridge		1830	August 8, 1979	Montandon; 40°57′37″N 76°48′58″W	Northumberland	Covered Burr arch
Rohrbach Covered Bridge No. 24	Rohrbach Covered Bridge	1846	November 29, 1979	Catawissa; 40°54′0″N 76°30′43″W	Columbia	Covered queen post truss
Rudolph and Arthur Covered Bridge		1880	December 10, 1980	West Grove; 39°44′45″N 75°52′57″W	Chester	Covered Burr truss
Rupert Covered Bridge No. 56		1847	November 29, 1979	Rupert; 40°58′53″N 76°28′23″W	Columbia	Covered Burr truss-arch
Ryot Covered Bridge		1868	April 10, 1980	Fishertown; 40°8′32″N 78°37′30″W	Bedford	Covered
Sauck's Covered Bridge		1854	August 25, 1980	Cumberland / Freedom Townships; 39°47′50.5″N 77°16′34″W	Adams	Covered Town truss
Saville Covered Bridge		1903	August 25, 1980	Saville; 40°26′17″N 77°23′47″W	Perry	Covered Burr
Sawhill Covered Bridge		1915	June 22, 1979	Taylorstown; 40°10′48″N 80°24′59″W	Washington	Covered queenpost truss
Schlicher Covered Bridge		1882	December 1, 1980	Allentown; 40°39′42″N 75°37′38″W	Lehigh	Covered Burr truss
Schuylkill County Bridge No. 113		ca. 1875	January 3, 1978	Rock; 40°32′42″N 76°17′43″W	Schuylkill	Burr arch
Schuylkill County Bridge No. 114		ca. 1875	January 3, 1978	Rock; 40°32′39″N 76°19′33″W	Schuylkill	Burr arch
Scott Covered Bridge		1885	June 22, 1979	Rogersville; 39°53′15″N 80°19′33″W	Greene	Covered queenpost truss
Seigrist's Mill Covered Bridge		1885	December 10, 1980	Columbia; 40°4′33″N 76°28′17″W	Lancaster	Covered Burr arch
Shaffer's Bridge		1877	December 10, 1980	Tire Hill; 40°16′52″N 78°57′52″W	Somerset	Covered Burr arch
Sheard's Mill Covered Bridge		ca. 1873	December 1, 1980	Richardtown; 40°27′17″N 75°16′44″W	Bucks	Covered Town truss
Shearer's Covered Bridge		1856	December 10, 1980	Manheim; 40°10′19″N 76°23′25″W	Lancaster	Covered Burr arch
Shenk's Mill Covered Bridge		1855	December 10, 1980	Manheim; 40°6′56″N 76°25′32″W	Lancaster	Covered Burr arch
Shoemaker Covered Bridge		1881	November 29, 1979	Iola; 41°9′5″N 76°32′11″W	Columbia	Covered queen post truss
Shriver Covered Bridge		1900	June 22, 1979	Rogersville; 39°51′9″N 80°16′46″W	Greene	Covered queenpost truss
Snooks Covered Bridge		1880	April 10, 1980	Alum Bank; 40°10′9″N 78°34′48″W	Bedford	Covered
Snyder Covered Bridge No. 17		ca. 1860	November 29, 1979	Slabtown; 40°54′5″N 76°23′41″W	Columbia	Covered queen post truss
Sonestown Covered Bridge		ca. 1850	July 24, 1980	Sonestown; 41°20′47″N 76°33′19″W	Sullivan	Covered Burr arch
South Perkasie Covered Bridge		1832	December 1, 1980	Perkasie; 40°22′3″N 75°17′43″W	Bucks	Covered Town truss
Speakman No. 1		1881	December 10, 1980	Modena; 39°55′46″N 75°49′21″W	Chester	Covered Burr truss
Speakman No. 2, Mary Ann Pyle Bridge		1881	December 10, 1980	Modena; 39°55′19″N 75°48′1″W	Chester	Covered Burr truss
Sprowl's Covered Bridge		1875	June 22, 1979	West Finley; 40°0′39″N 80°24′25″W	Washington	Covered kingpost truss
St. Mary's Covered Bridge		1889	March 20, 1980	Orbisonia; 40°12′21″N 77°52′42″W	Huntingdon	Covered Howe truss
Linton Stephens Covered Bridge		1886	December 10, 1980	New London; 39°45′23″N 75°54′46″W	Chester	Covered Burr truss
Stillwater Covered Bridge No. 134		1849	November 29, 1979	Stillwater; 41°9′7″N 76°21′39″W	Columbia	Covered Burr arch
Thomas Covered Bridge		1879	August 3, 1979	Creekside; 40°39′50″N 79°14′13″W	Indiana	Covered Town truss
Thomas Mill Covered Bridge	Thomas Mill Covered Bridge	1855	December 1, 1980	Philadelphia; 40°4′18″N 75°13′33″W	Philadelphia	Covered Howe truss
Trostletown Bridge	Trostleton Bridge	1845	December 11, 1980	Stoystown; 40°5′45″N 78°56′44″W	Somerset	Covered kingpost truss
Trusal Covered Bridge		1870	August 3, 1979	Willet; 40°43′49″N 79°11′5″W	Indiana	Covered Town truss
Twin Bridges-East Paden Covered Bridge No. 120	Twin Bridges-East Paden Covered Bridge No. 120	1850	November 29, 1979	Forks; 41°6′25″N 76°21′25″W	Columbia	Covered queen post truss
Twin Bridges-West Paden Covered Bridge No. 121	Twin Bridges-West Paden Covered Bridge No. 121	1850	November 29, 1979	Forks; 41°6′25″N 76°21′25″W	Columbia	Covered Burr truss-arch
Uhlerstown Covered Bridge	Uhlerstown Covered Bridge	1856	October 29, 1974	Uhlerstown; 40°31′31.6″N 75°4′23.2″W	Bucks	Covered Town lattice truss
Van Sandt Covered Bridge	Van Sandt Covered Bridge	1875	December 1, 1980	Solebury Township; 40°19′37″N 74°57′29″W	Bucks	Covered Town truss
Waggoner Covered Bridge	Waggoner Covered Bridge	1889	August 25, 1980	Loysville; 40°21′34″N 77°22′23″W	Perry	Covered Burr truss
Wagner Covered Bridge No. 19		1856	November 29, 1979	Newlin; 40°53′32″N 76°22′28″W	Columbia	Covered queen post truss
Walter's Mill Bridge		1830	December 10, 1980	Somerset; 40°3′56″N 79°4′40″W	Somerset	Covered Burr arch
Wanich Covered Bridge No. 69		1884	November 29, 1979	Fernville; 41°2′23″N 76°29′1″W	Columbia	Covered Burr truss-arch
Waterford Covered Bridge		1875	September 17, 1980	Waterford; 41°56′29″N 79°57′52″W	Erie	Covered Town truss
Weaver's Mill Covered Bridge		1878	December 11, 1980	Churchtown; 40°7′47″N 75°58′35″W	Lancaster	Covered Burr arch
Wehr Covered Bridge		1841	December 1, 1980	Orefield; 40°34′8″N 75°30′17″W	Lehigh	Covered Burr truss
Wertz's Covered Bridge		1867	November 17, 1978	Reading; 40°22′7″N 75°58′44″W	Berks	Covered Burr arch truss
White Covered Bridge		1919	June 22, 1979	Garards Fort; 39°48′24″N 80°03′39″W	Greene	Covered queenpost truss
White Rock Forge Covered Bridge		1847	December 10, 1980	Kirkwood; 39°49′29″N 76°5′25″W	Lancaster	Covered Burr arch
Wilson's Mill Covered Bridge		1889	June 22, 1979	Avella; 40°15′15″N 80°23′55″W	Washington	Covered kingpost truss
Woods Covered Bridge		1899	June 22, 1979	Oak Forest; 39°51′46″N 80°4′50″W	Greene	Covered queenpost truss
Cerl Wright Covered Bridge			June 22, 1979	Bentleyville; 40°9′32″N 80°2′56″W	Washington	Covered kingpost truss
Wyit Sprowls Covered Bridge		1915	June 22, 1979	East Finley; 40°02′22″N 80°24′06″W	Washington	Covered queenpost truss
Y Covered Bridge No. 156		1887	November 29, 1979	Central; 41°17′23″N 76°21′52″W	Columbia	Covered queen post truss
Zook's Mill Covered Bridge		1849	December 11, 1980	Brownstown; 40°7′50″N 76°13′54″W	Lancaster	Covered Burr arch

== Former listings ==
Name	Image	Built	Listed	Location	County	Type
Bittenbender Covered Bridge		1888	Removed June 28, 2006	Huntington Mills; 41°10′51″N 76°13′30″W	Luzerne	Covered queenpost truss
Carman Covered Bridge		1870	Removed November 29, 1996	West Springfield	Erie	Covered multiple kingpost truss
Conewago Chapel Covered Bridge		1899	Removed June 27, 1986	McSherrystown	Adams	Covered Burr truss
Haupt's Mill Covered Bridge		1872	Removed June 27, 1986	Springtown	Bucks	Covered Town truss
Jackson's Mill Covered Bridge		1878	Removed June 27, 1986	Kirkwood	Lancaster	Covered Burr arch
McDaniels Covered Bridge		1873	Removed October 13, 1988	Bedford	Bedford	Covered
Mood's Covered Bridge	Mood's Covered Bridge	1874	Removed August 19, 2004	Perkasie	Bucks	Covered Town truss
Neils Red Covered Bridge		1900	Removed 2018	Garards Fort; 39°48′43″N 80°0′50″W	Greene	Covered Burr arch
Risser's Mill Covered Bridge		1849	Removed December 5, 2003	Manheim	Lancaster	Covered Burr arch
Twining Ford Covered Bridge		1874	Removed June 1, 1994	Newtown	Bucks	Covered Town truss
Welle Hess Covered Bridge No. S1		1871	Removed June 27, 1986	Grassmere Park	Columbia	Covered Burr arch truss
