= Hall's Bridge =

- U.S. National Register of Historic Places
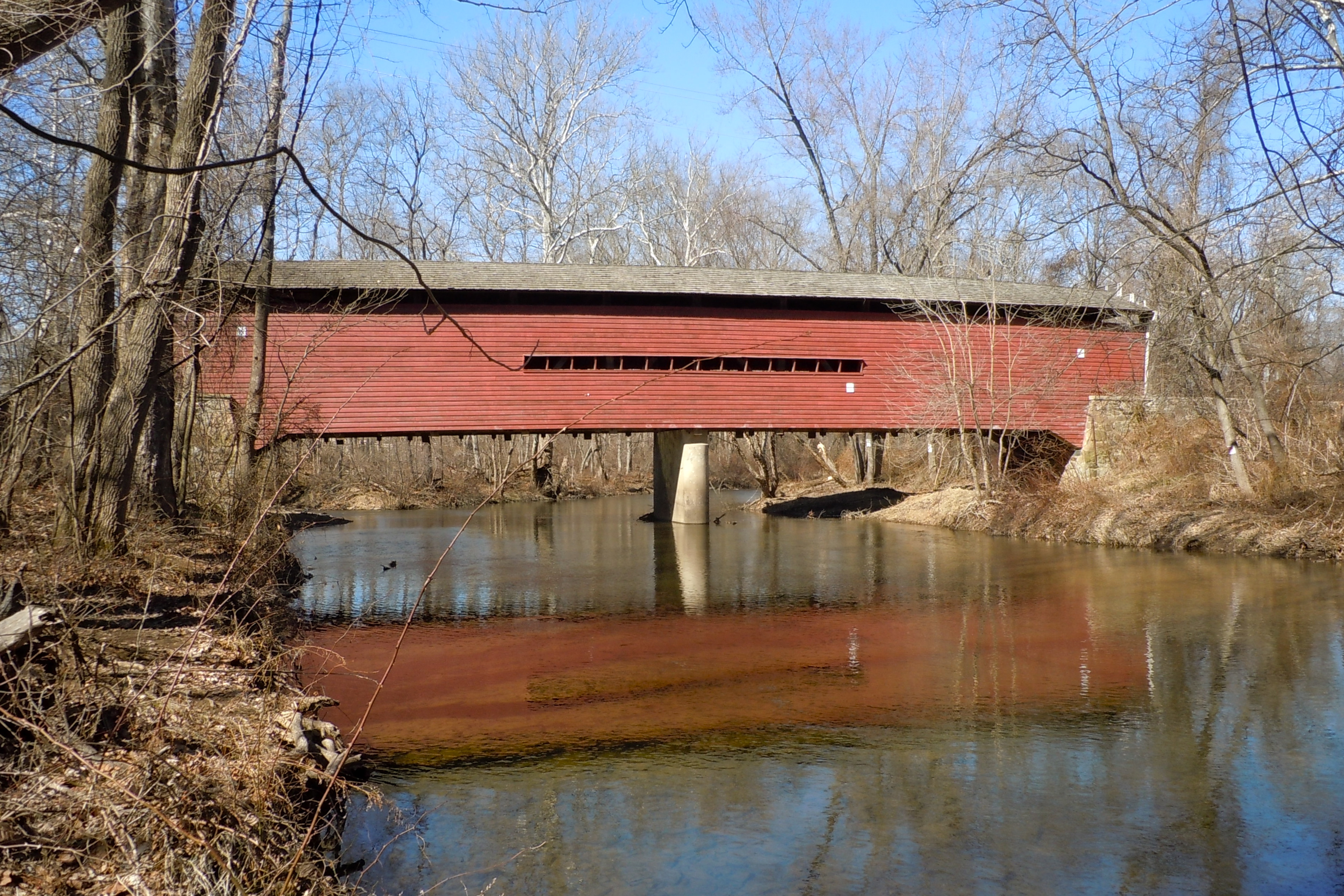
- Hall's Bridge, March 2011

- Location within Pennsylvania Location within the United States
- Location: About 3 miles (4.8 km) north of Chester Springs at Sheeder Road and Birch Run, East Vincent Township and West Vincent Township, Pennsylvania
- Coordinates: 40°8′51″N 75°37′15″W
- Area: 2 acres (0.81 ha)
- Built: 1850
- Architectural style: Burr truss
- MPS: Covered Bridges of Chester County TR (AD)
- NRHP reference No.: 73001600
- Added to NRHP: April 23, 1973

Hall's Bridge, also known as Sheeder-Hall Bridge, is an historic, wooden covered bridge which is located in East Vincent Township and West Vincent Township, Chester County, Pennsylvania.

It was listed on the National Register of Historic Places in 1973.

== History and architectural features ==
This structure has two spans and is a 100-foot-long (30 m), Burr truss bridge, which was built in 1850. It is the oldest covered bridge in Chester County, and crosses French Creek, just downstream of its confluence with Birch Run.

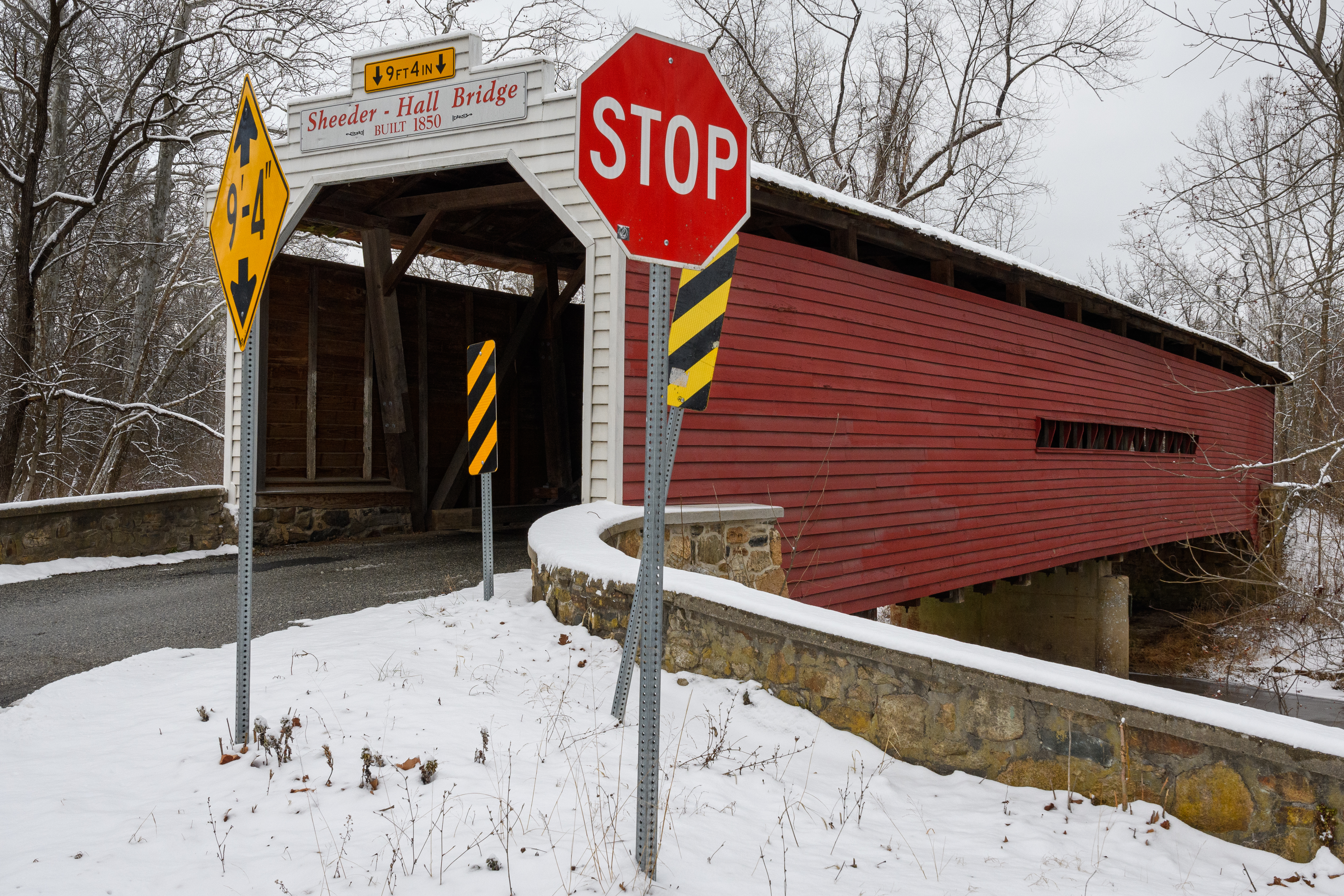
Southeastern Entrance
