= McDaniels Covered Bridge =

- Formerly listed on the U.S. National Register of Historic Places
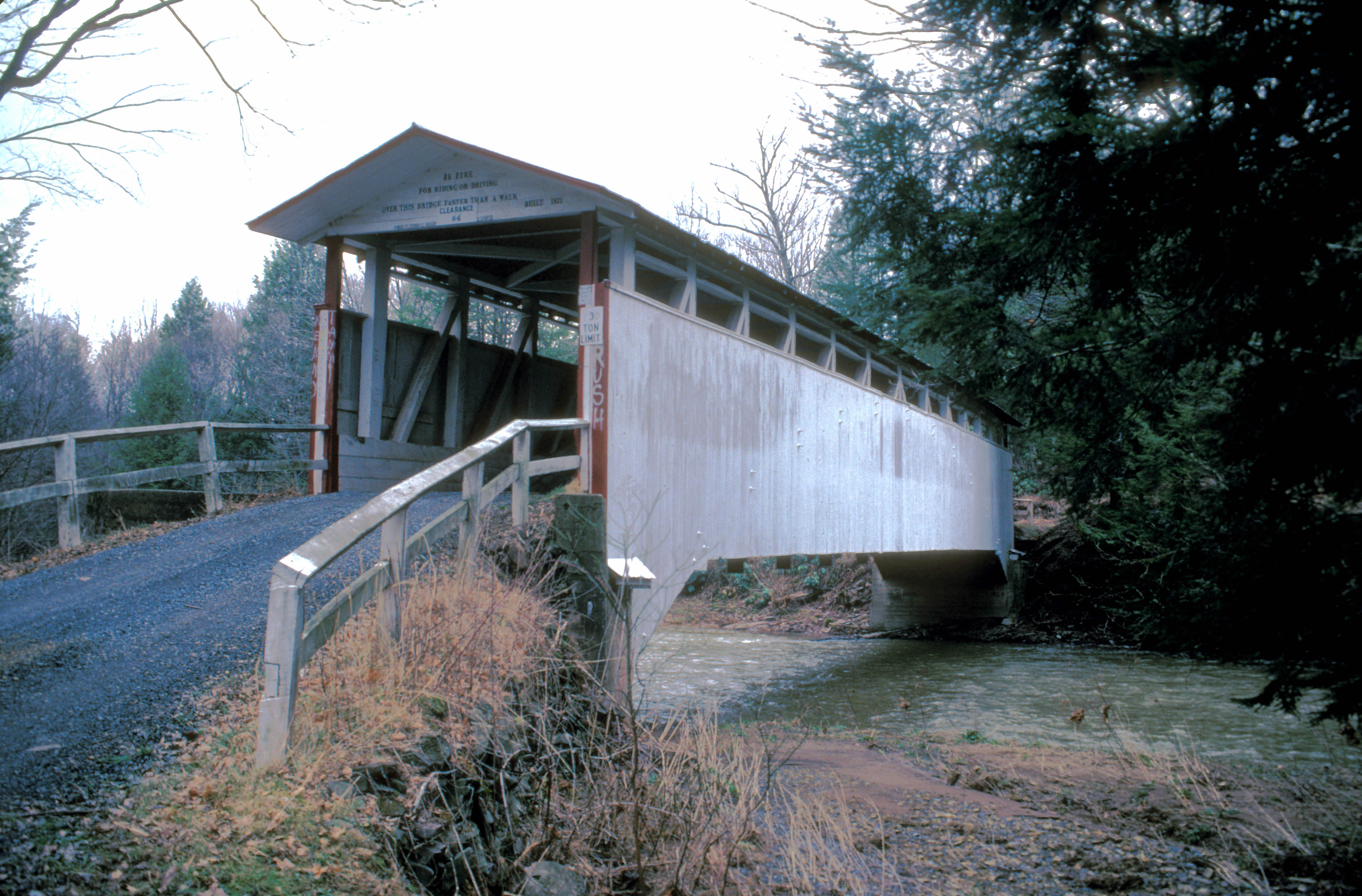
- McDaniels Covered Bridge, May 1980
- Nearest city: Bedford, Pennsylvania
- Area: less than one acre
- MPS: Bedford County Covered Bridges TR
- NRHP reference No.: 80003415

Significant dates
- Added to NRHP: April 10, 1980
- Removed from NRHP: October 13, 1988

The McDaniels Covered Bridge was a historic covered bridge located in East Providence Township and West Providence Township, Bedford County, Pennsylvania. It was built in 1873, and was a 110-foot long Burr truss bridge. it was similar in style to the Ryot Covered Bridge

It was listed on the National Register of Historic Places and delisted in 1988, after being destroyed by fire.
