= Knapp's Covered Bridge =

- U.S. National Register of Historic Places
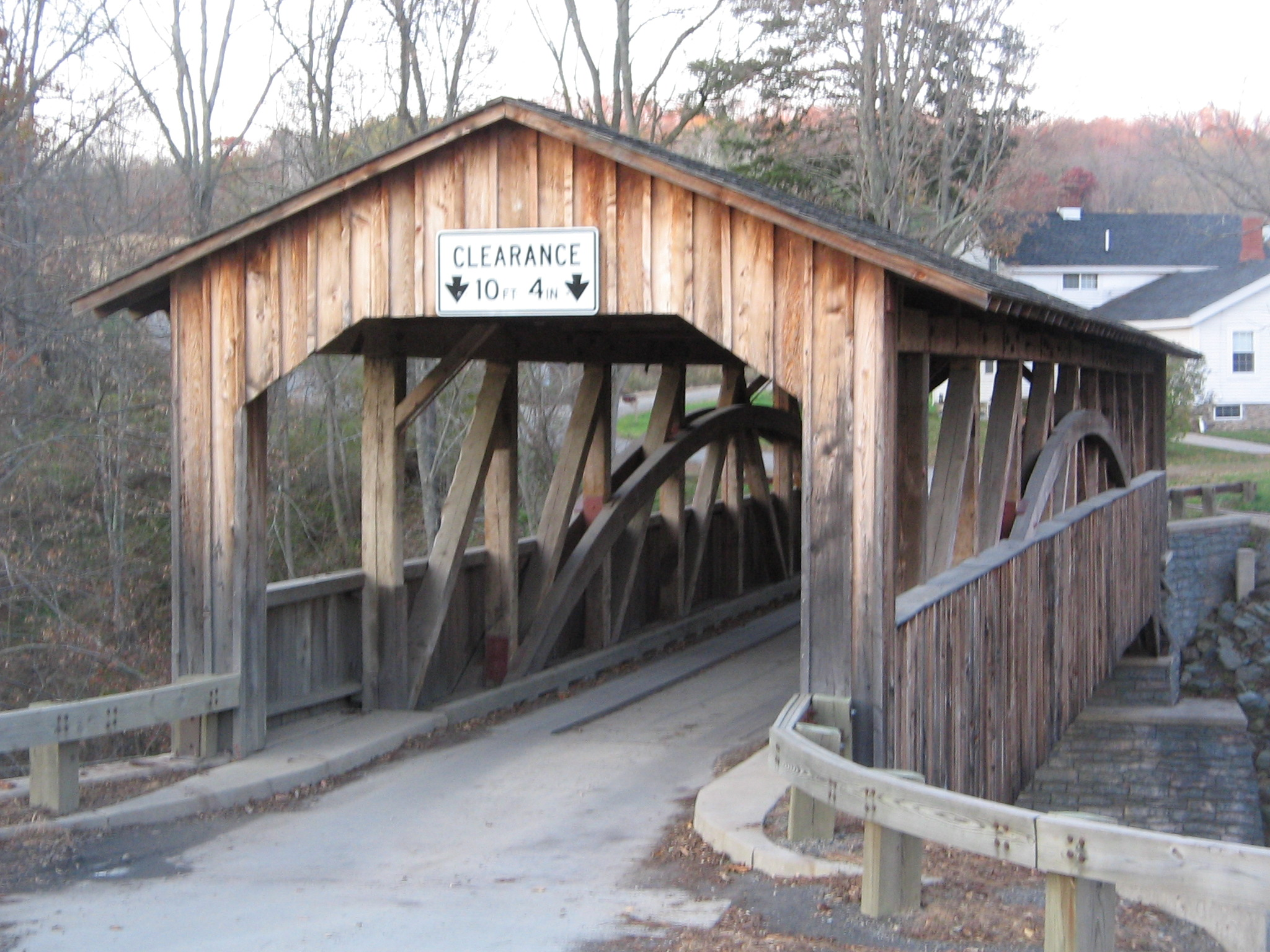

- Location within Pennsylvania Location within the United States
- Nearest city: Burlington, Pennsylvania
- Coordinates: 41°47′9″N 76°33′13″W
- Area: 0.1 acres (0.040 ha)
- Built: 1853
- Architectural style: Burr truss
- MPS: Covered Bridges of Bradford, Sullivan and Lycoming Counties TR
- NRHP reference No.: 80003428
- Added to NRHP: July 24, 1980

Knapp's Covered Bridge is a Burr arch truss covered bridge that was erected over Brown's Creek in Burlington Township, Bradford County in the U.S. state of Pennsylvania.

== History and architectural features ==
It was built in 1853 and is 95 feet (29.0 m) long. The bridge was placed on the National Register of Historic Places in 1980, and had a major restoration starting in 2000. Named for a local family, it is also known as the Luther's Mills Covered Bridge (for the nearby village of Luther's Mills) and as the Brown's Creek Covered Bridge.
