= Heikes Covered Bridge =

- U.S. National Register of Historic Places
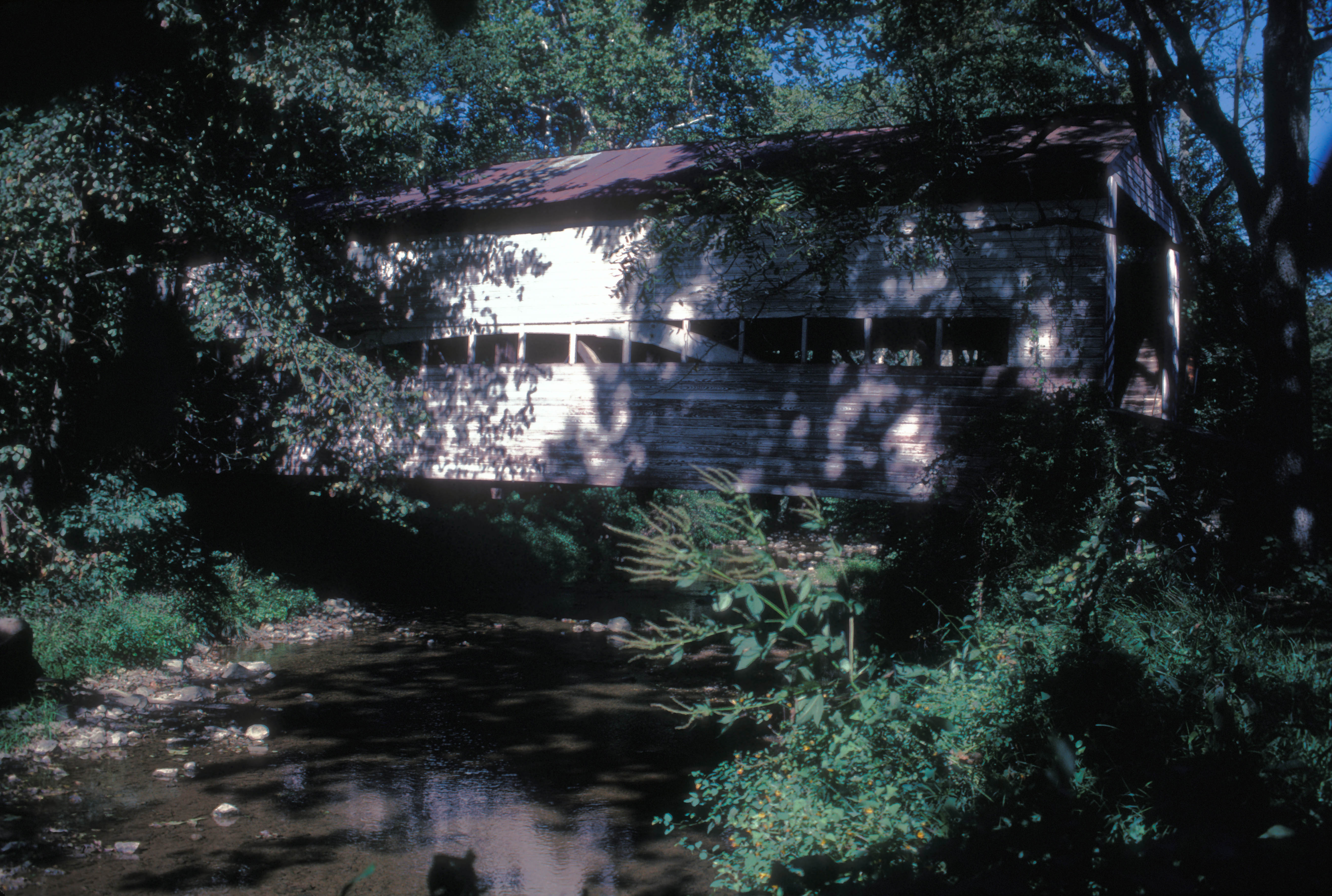

- Location within Pennsylvania Location within the United States
- Location: North of Heidlersburg on Township 5857, Huntington Township, Pennsylvania
- Coordinates: 39°58′49″N 77°9′6″W
- Area: 0 acres (0 ha)
- Architectural style: Burr truss
- MPS: Covered Bridges of Adams, Cumberland, and Perry Counties TR
- NRHP reference No.: 80003396
- Added to NRHP: August 25, 1980

The Heikes Covered Bridge is a historic covered bridge in Huntington Township, Adams County, Pennsylvania, United States. It was built in 1892, and is a 67-foot-long (20 m), Burr truss bridge. The bridge crosses Bermudian Creek. It is one of 17 covered bridges in Adams, Cumberland, and Perry Counties.

It was added to the National Register of Historic Places in 1980.
