= Jacks Mountain Covered Bridge =

- U.S. National Register of Historic Places
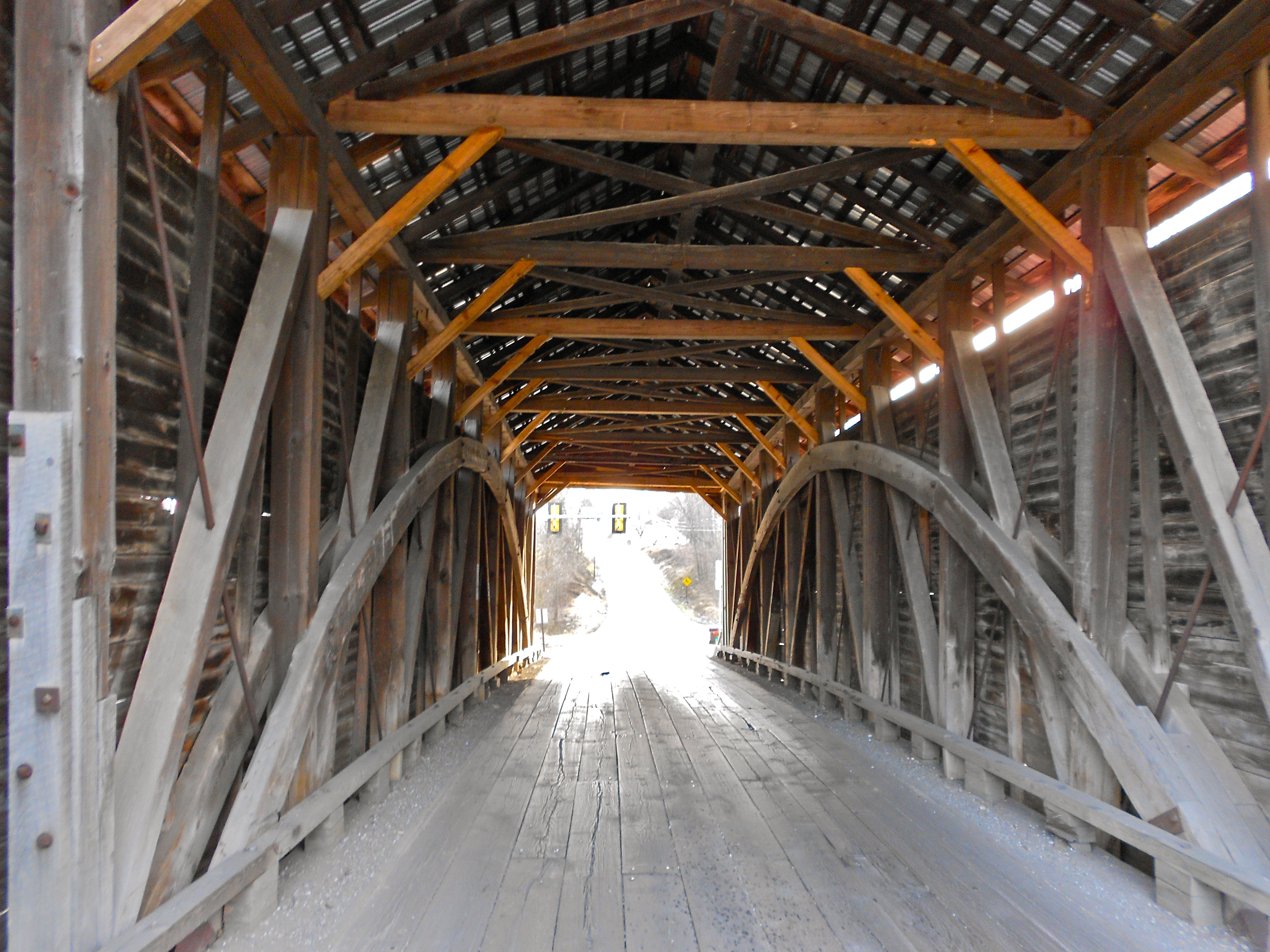
- Interior

- Location within Pennsylvania Location within the United States
- Location: Southwest of Fairfield on Legislative Route 01053, near Iron Springs, Hamiltonban Township, Pennsylvania
- Coordinates: 39°46′1″N 77°23′13″W
- Area: 0.1 acres (0.040 ha)
- Architect: Joseph Smith
- Architectural style: Burr truss
- MPS: Covered Bridges of Adams, Cumberland, and Perry Counties TR
- NRHP reference No.: 80003397
- Added to NRHP: August 25, 1980

The Jacks Mountain Covered Bridge (officially known as the G. Donald McLaughlin Memorial Covered Bridge) is an historic covered bridge which is located in Hamiltonban Township, Adams County, Pennsylvania, United States.

It was added to the National Register of Historic Places in 1980.

== History and architectural features ==
Built in 1890, this historic structure is a 75-foot-long (23 m), Burr truss bridge with narrow horizontal siding and a tin covered gable roof. The bridge crosses Tom's Creek. It is one of seventeen covered bridges in Adams, Cumberland, and Perry Counties.

It was added to the National Register of Historic Places in 1980.

== Gallery ==
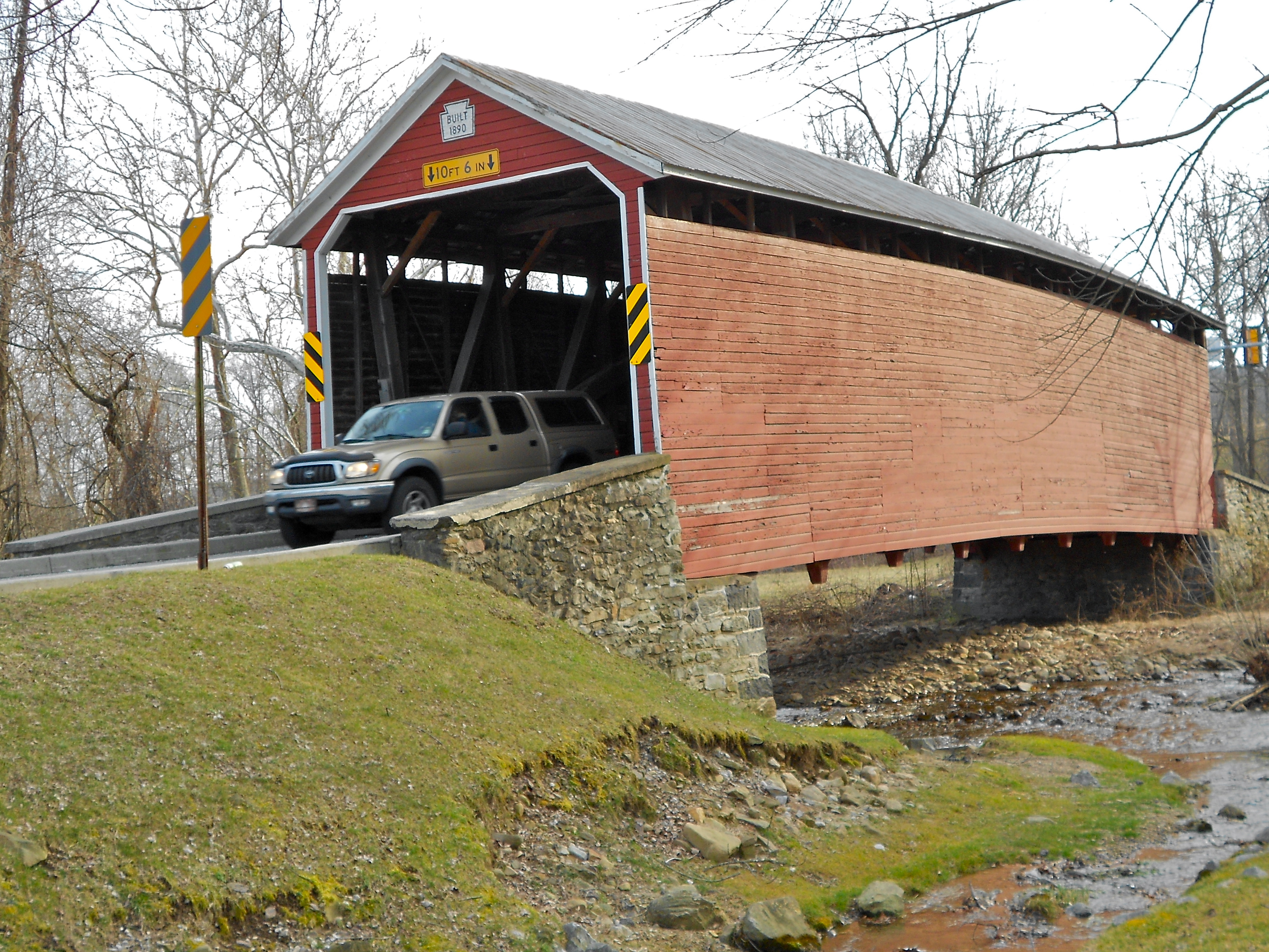
View from the north
