= Geiger Covered Bridge =

- U.S. National Register of Historic Places
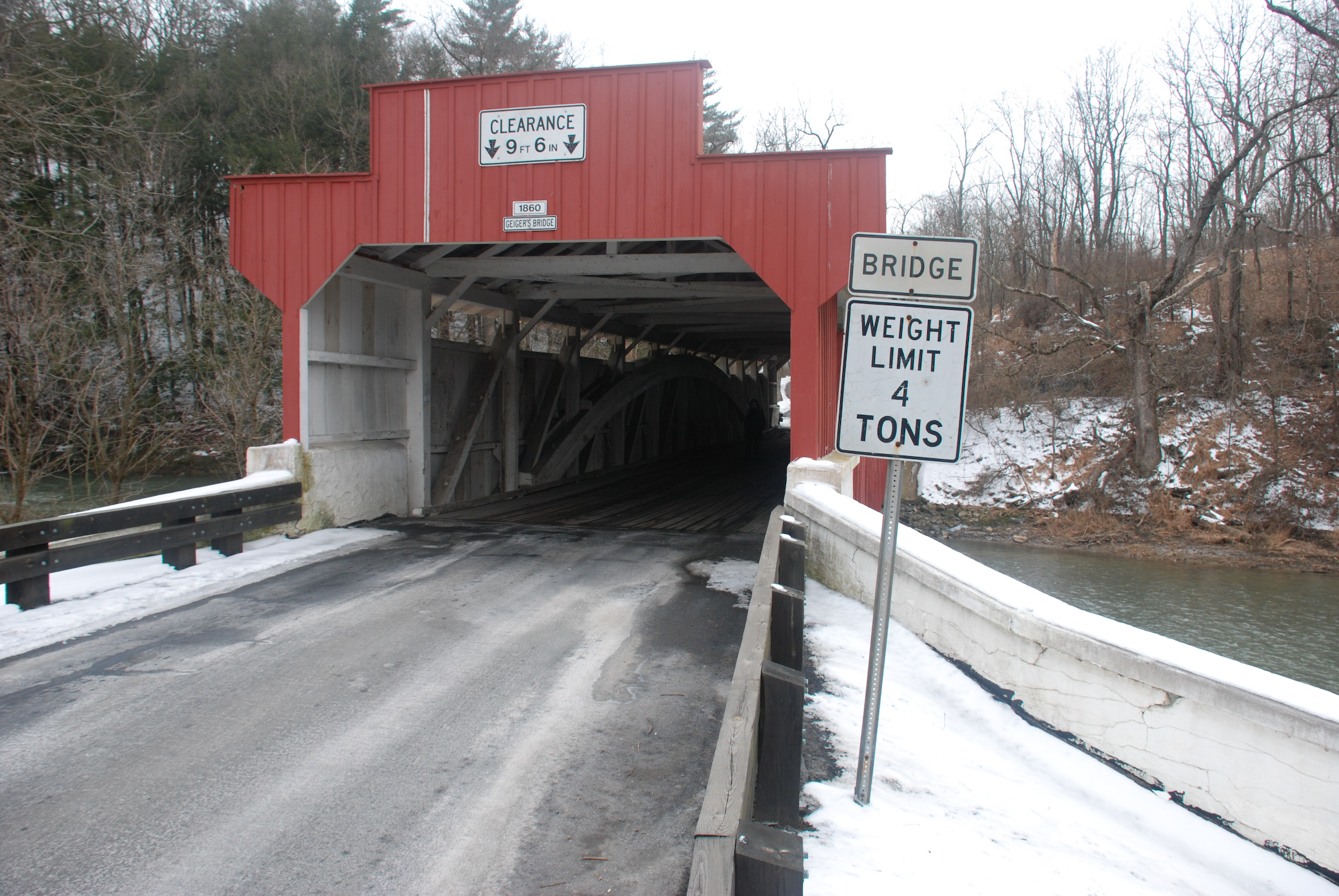
- Geiger Covered Bridge in February 2008

- Location within Pennsylvania Location within the United States
- Location: Southeast of Schnecksville on Township 681, North Whitehall Township, Pennsylvania
- Coordinates: 40.64645°N 75.62351°W
- Area: 0.1 acres (0.040 ha)
- Built: 1860
- Architectural style: Burr truss
- MPS: Covered Bridges of the Delaware River Watershed TR
- NRHP reference No.: 80003558
- Added to NRHP: December 1, 1980

Geiger Covered Bridge is a historic wooden covered bridge located at North Whitehall Township, Lehigh County, Pennsylvania. It is a 112-foot-long (34 m), Burr Truss bridge, constructed in 1860. It has vertical plank siding and an entry portal of stepped square planks. It crosses Jordan Creek.

It was listed on the National Register of Historic Places in 1980.
