= Bogert Covered Bridge =

- U.S. National Register of Historic Places
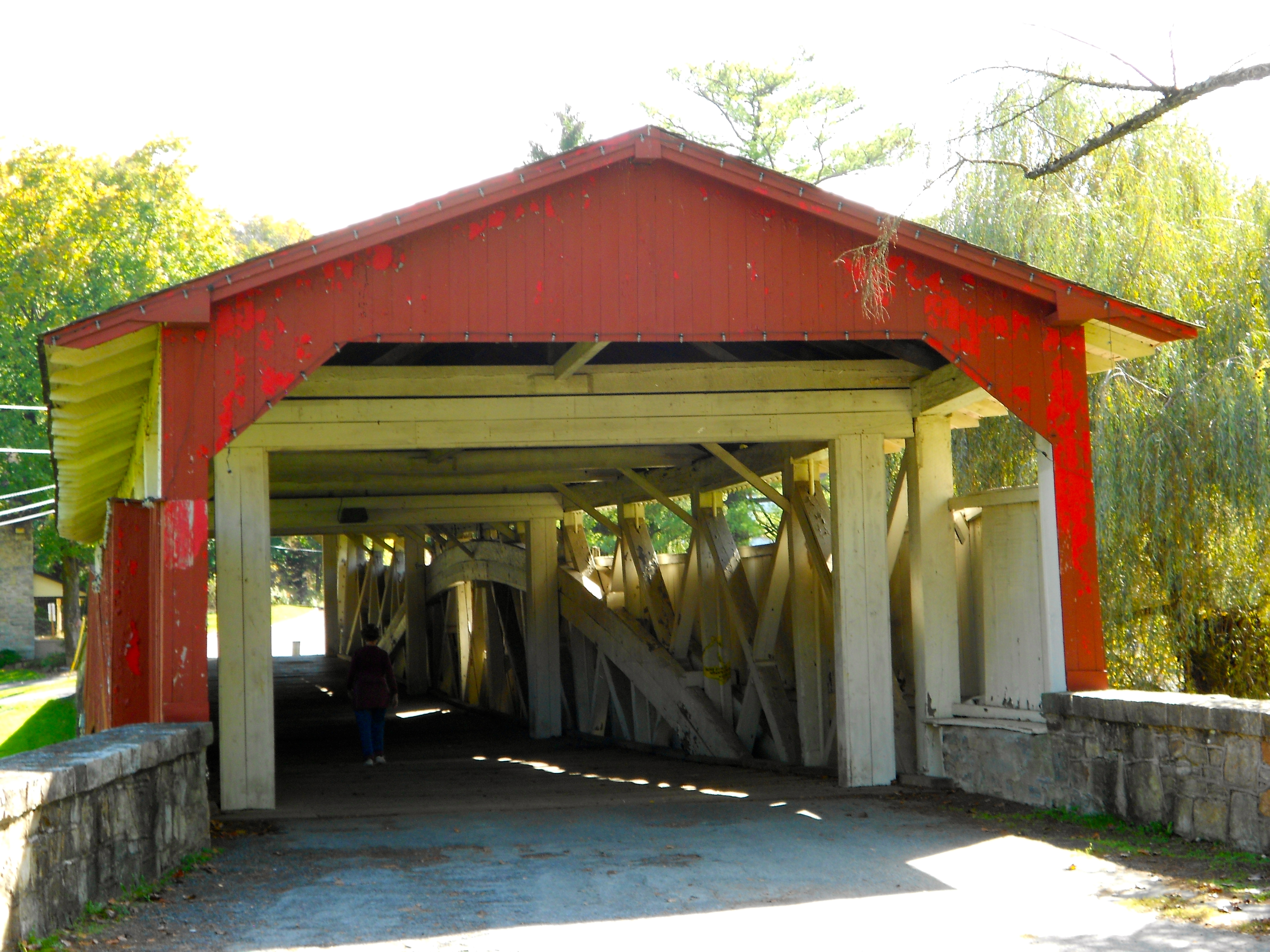
- Bogert Covered Bridge in Allentown, Pennsylvania, October 2012

- Location within Pennsylvania Location within the United States
- Location: S of Allentown on LR 39016, Little Lehigh Park, Allentown, Pennsylvania, U.S.
- Coordinates: 40°34′9″N 75°29′55″W
- Area: 0.1 acres (0.040 ha)
- Built: 1841; 185 years ago
- Architectural style: Burr Truss
- MPS: Covered Bridges of the Delaware River Watershed TR
- NRHP reference No.: 80003552
- Added to NRHP: December 1, 1980

Bogert Covered Bridge is a historic wooden covered bridge located at Allentown, Pennsylvania. It is a 145-foot-long (44 m), Burr Truss bridge, constructed in 1841. It has vertical plank siding and a gable roof. It was restored by the Allentown Parks Department.

== History ==
=== 19th century ===
Bogert's Bridge was built between 1841 and 1842. It takes its name from the Bogert family. Peter Bogert purchased the land on which the bridge is located in 1744 as part of his farm. Settlers are said to have put stones in the Little Lehigh River at the location of the bridge, which were used as a crossing prior to its construction. In the 1760s, a crude log bridge, later replaced by a wooden plank bridge, was built on the site.

When Indian tribes complained that the bridge blocked their canoes, Bogert was called on to settle the dispute. The Indians believed he treated them fairly, and called Bogert "the Peacemaker."

Bogert's Bridge is a Burr Truss, named after a design created by Theodore Burr of Connecticut in the early 19th century. Its most distinctive feature is two long arch trusses resting on abutments at either end. It was built by local men. John Waltman of Allentown worked on the bridge as a carpenter's apprentice at the age of 16.

=== 20th century ===
In 1945, management of the bridge was transferred from Lehigh County to the Pennsylvania Department of Highways since it carried South 24th Street, which linked state routes Hamilton Street and Lehigh Street.

On February 19, 1956 at 3:15 a.m., a speeding truck pulling a trailer smashed into the bridge, splintering seven of the bridge's twelve-by-twelve-inch crossbeams. Its roof sagged in the middle. Lehigh County officials initially wanted to tear down the bridge, believing it had become a traffic hazard. The following year, on May 30, 1957, a second accident involving a truck carrying an earthmover crashed into the bridge, smashing the roof and causing extensive damage.

In 1957, a letter writing campaign by the Save the Bogert's Bridge Committee obtained state approval to redirect South 24th Street to a new bridge located a few hundred feet away from the structure.

In 1964, the covered bridge was reconstructed by the Commonwealth of Pennsylvania, and its management was then transferred to Allentown.

Bogert's is the oldest covered bridge in Lehigh County, and among the oldest in the country. It is open to pedestrian and bicycle traffic only. In 1980, it was listed on the National Register of Historic Places in 1980.

September 4, 2025, the City of Allentown announced the start of major rehabilitation work on the Historic Bogert’s Covered Bridge beginning September 15.

== Gallery ==
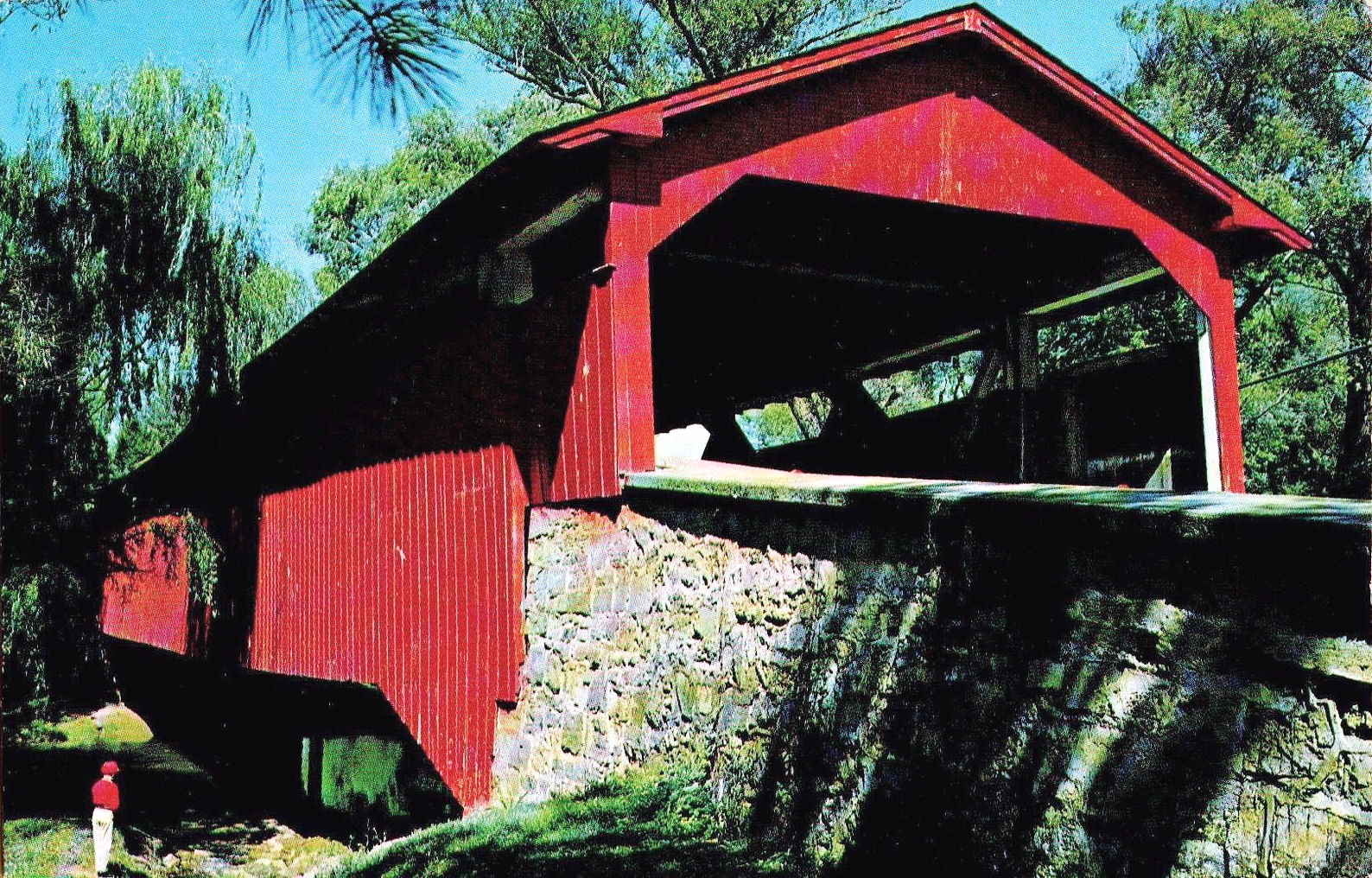
Bogert Covered Bridge in 1965

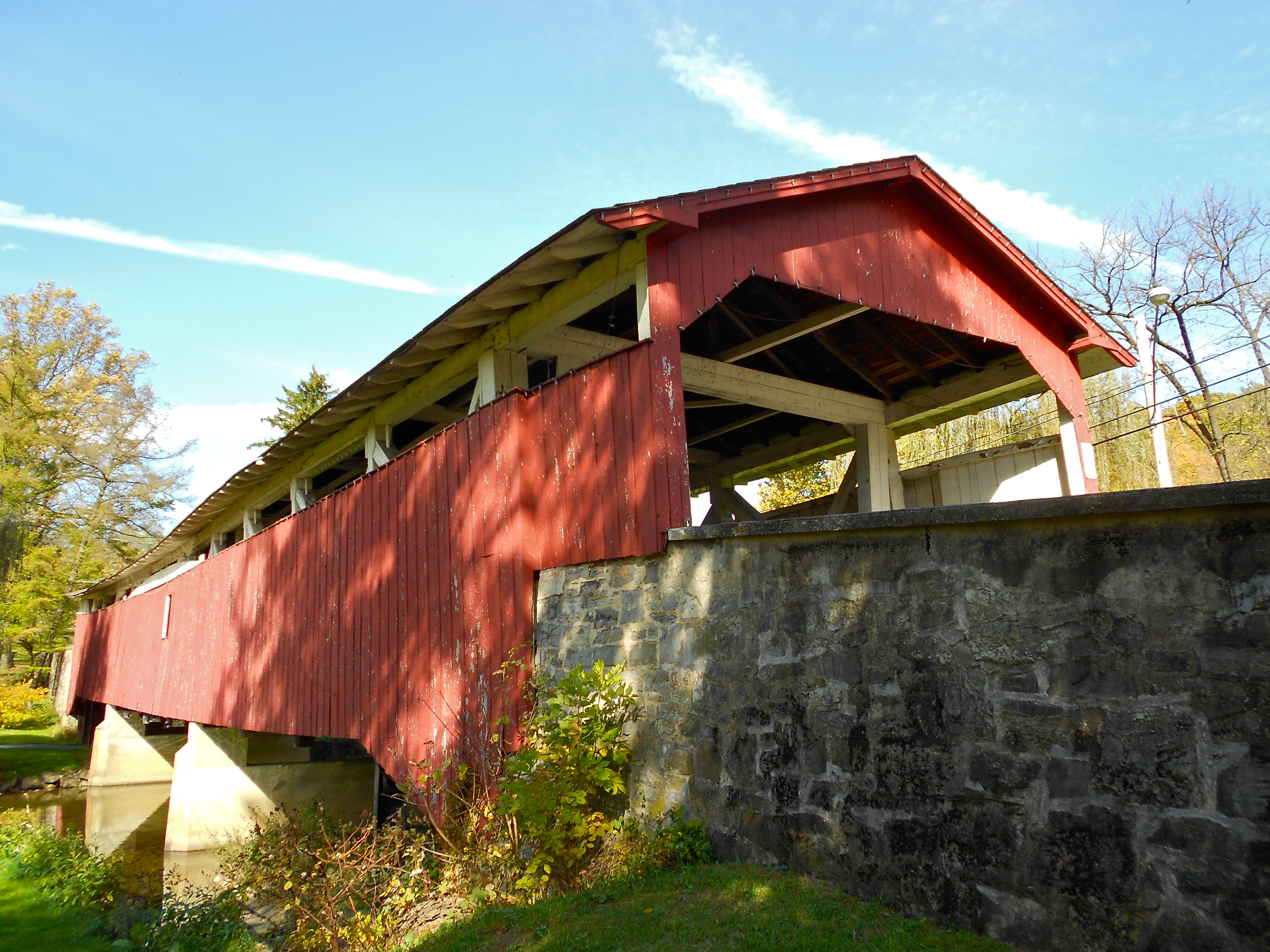
Bogert Covered Bridge in 2012

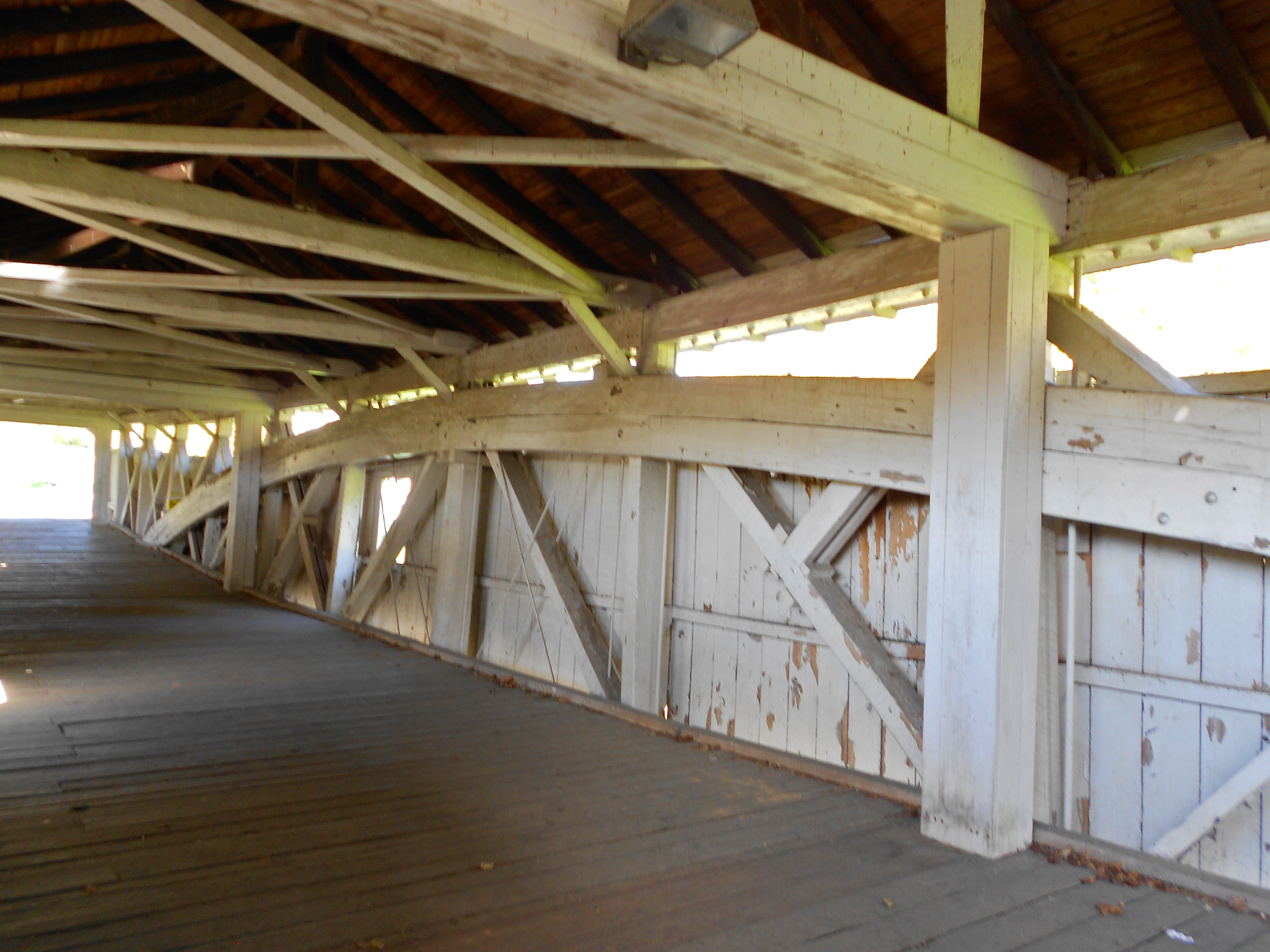
The interior of the bridge

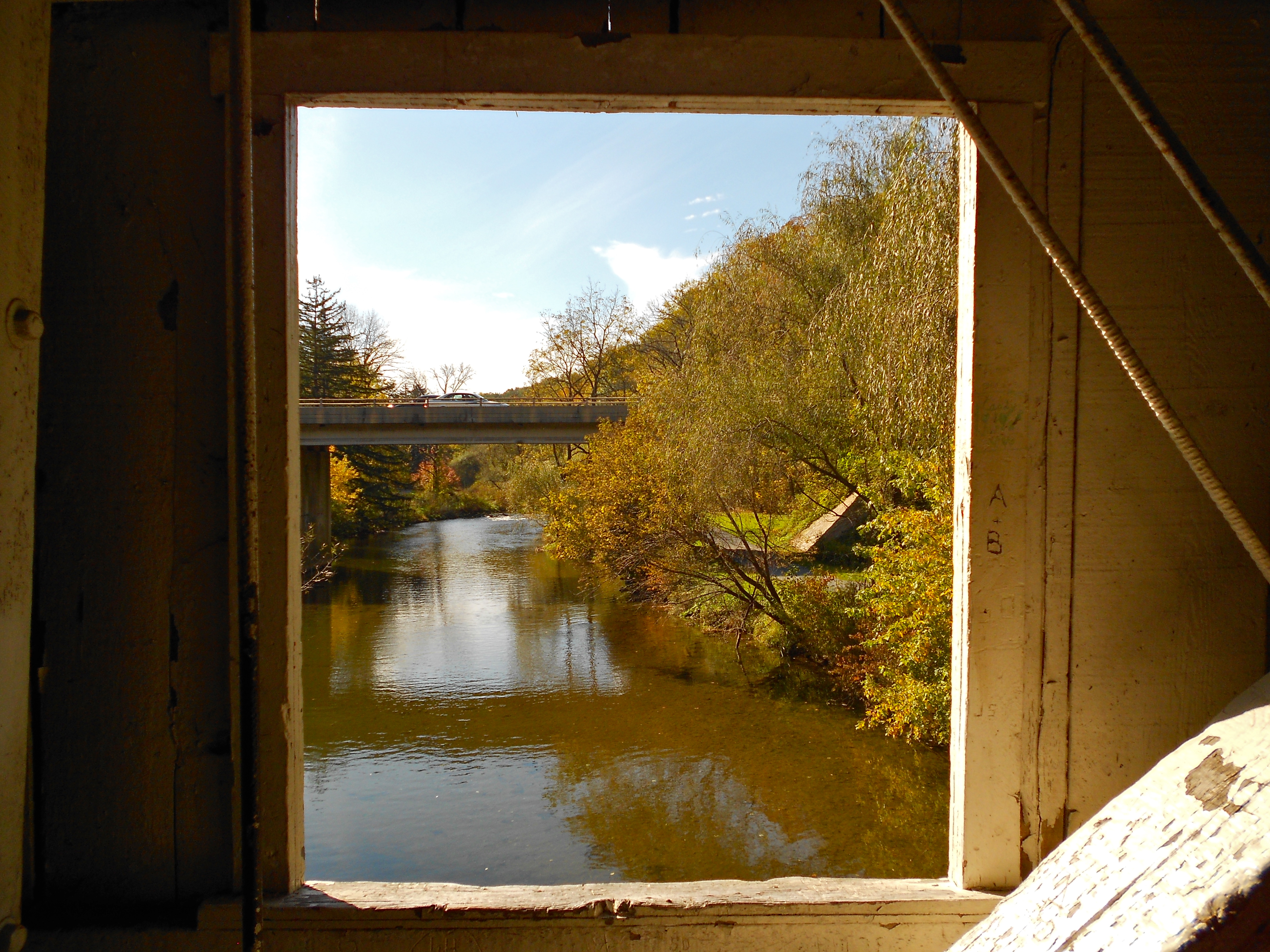
Looking south from the bridge

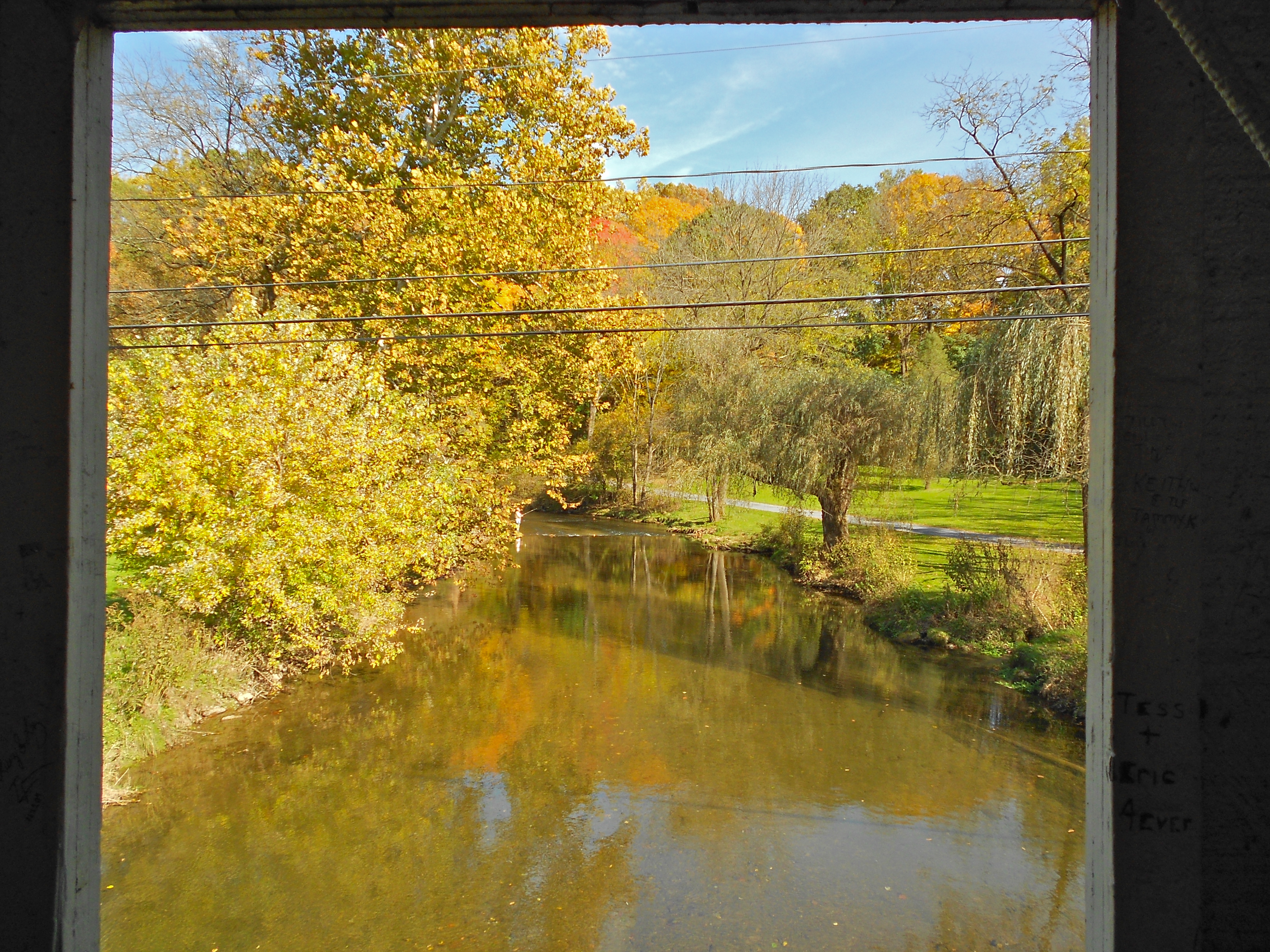
Looking north from the bridge

== See also ==
- List of historic places in Allentown, Pennsylvania
