= Conewago Chapel Covered Bridge =

- Formerly listed on the U.S. National Register of Historic Places
- Location within Pennsylvania Location within the United States
- Nearest city: McSherrystown, Pennsylvania
- Coordinates: 39°49′13.4″N 77°2′35.95″W
- Area: 0.1 acres (0.040 ha)
- Architect: J.F. Socks
- Architectural style: Burr truss
- MPS: Covered Bridges of Adams, Cumberland, and Perry Counties TR
- NRHP reference No.: 80003398

Significant dates
- Added to NRHP: August 25, 1980
- Removed from NRHP: June 27, 1986

Conewago Chapel Covered Bridge, also known as the Blue Spring Covered Bridge, was a historic wooden covered bridge located in Conewago and Mount Pleasant Townships in Adams County, Pennsylvania. It was a 98-foot-long (30 m), Burr Truss arch bridge with a metal roof constructed in 1899 by J.F. Socks. It crossed the South Branch of Conewago Creek and was one of 17 historic covered bridges in Adams, Cumberland, and Perry Counties when it was listed on the National Register of Historic Places (NRHP).

It was listed on the National Register of Historic Places (NRHP) in 1980, but was destroyed in an arson fire on June 14, 1985. The bridge was removed from the NRHP in 1986.
