= Schlicher Covered Bridge =

- U.S. National Register of Historic Places
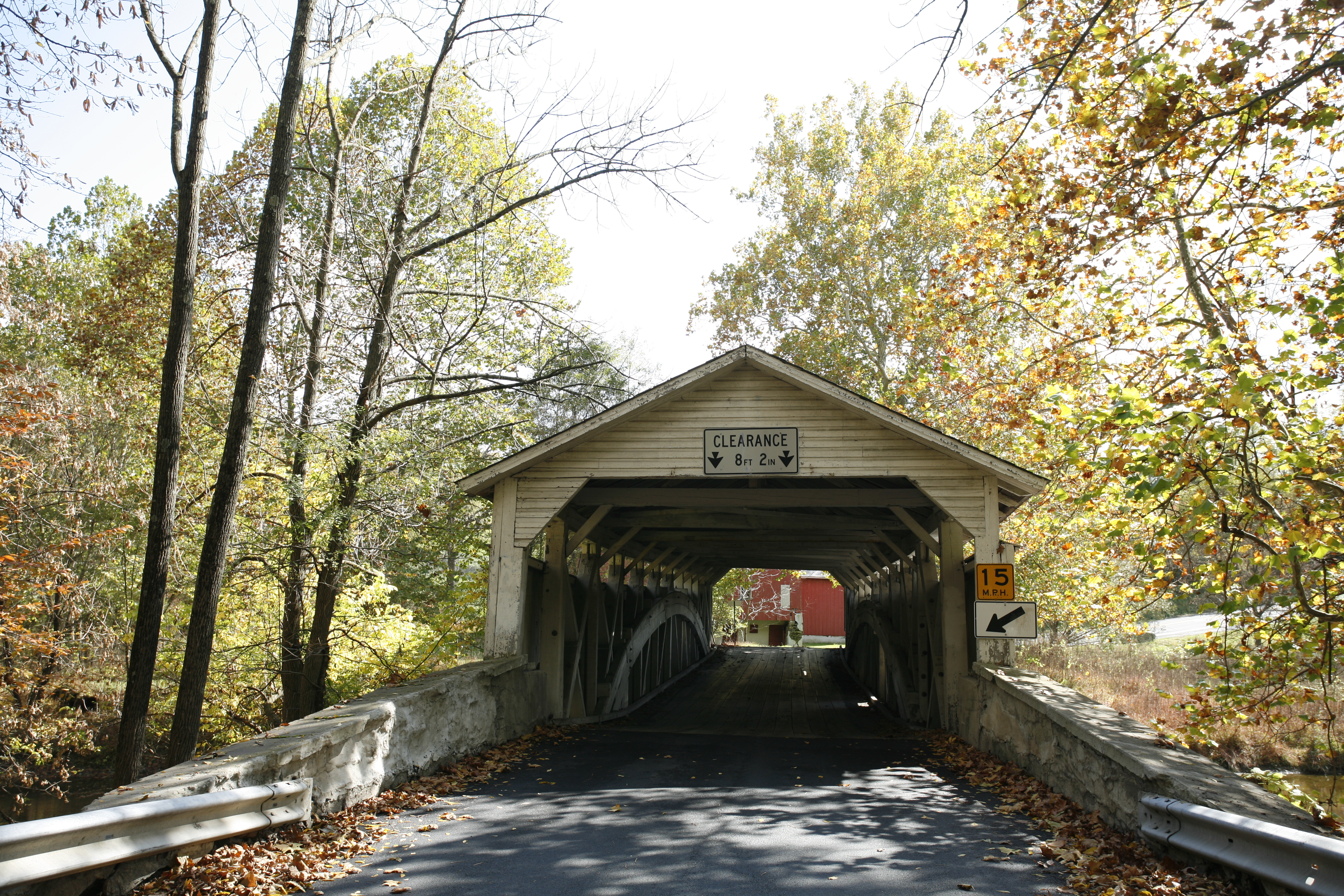
- The bridge in October 2006

- Location within Pennsylvania Location within the United States
- Location: Legislative Route 39058 in North Whitehall Township, Pennsylvania
- Coordinates: 40°39′42″N 75°37′38″W
- Area: 0.1 acres (0.040 ha)
- Built: 1882
- Architectural style: Burr truss
- MPS: Covered Bridges of the Delaware River Watershed TR
- NRHP reference No.: 80003555
- Added to NRHP: December 1, 1980

Schlicher Covered Bridge is a historic wooden covered bridge located at North Whitehall Township, Lehigh County, Pennsylvania. It is a 108-foot-long (33 m), Burr Truss bridge, constructed in 1882. It has vertical plank siding and a gable roof. It crosses Jordan Creek.

It was listed on the National Register of Historic Places in 1980.

== History ==
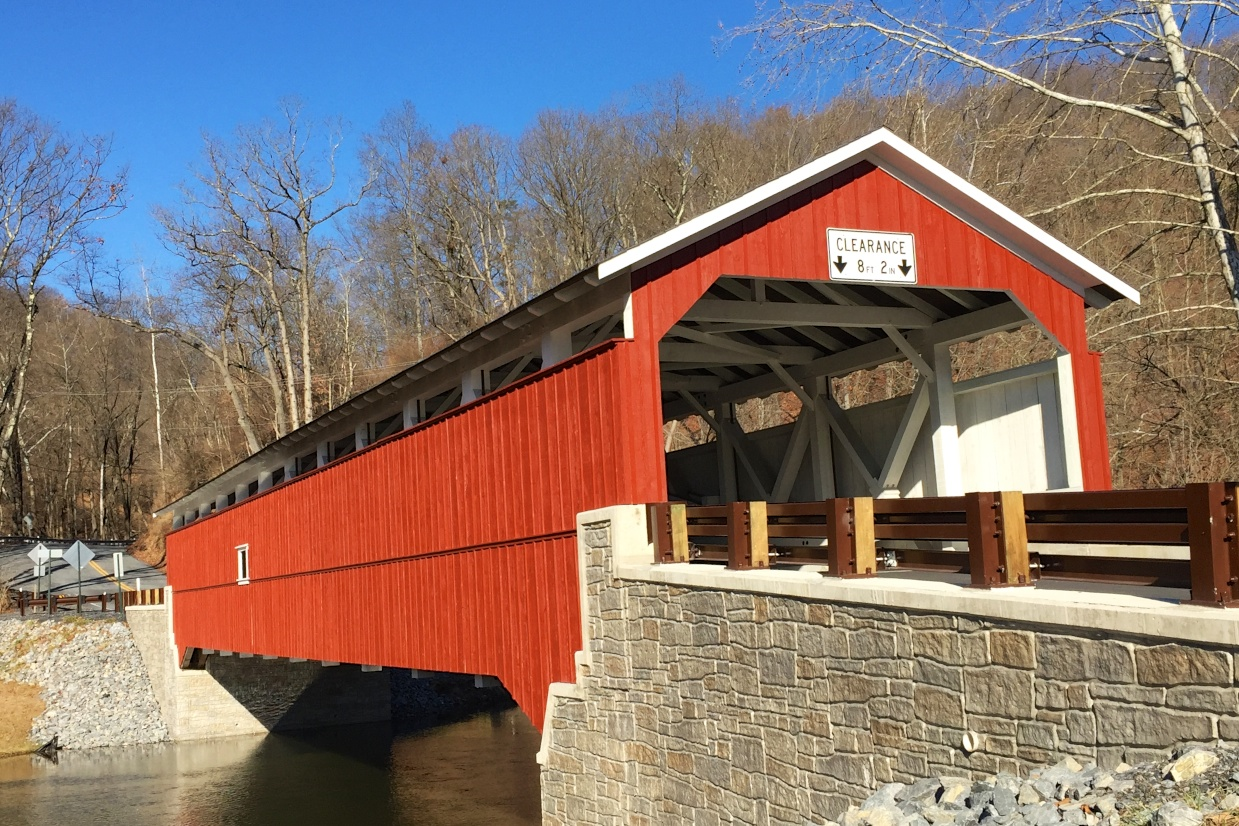
Reconstructed in 2014

Listed on the National Register of Historic Places in 1980, the bridge was closed to traffic in 2009, and was scheduled to be replaced with a modern replica in 2013. In 2014, work on the reconstructed bridge was completed. The new bridge is longer and wider than the original. Construction cost $1.8 million and retained about 10% of the original materials.
