= Welle Hess Covered Bridge No. S1 =

- Formerly listed on the U.S. National Register of Historic Places
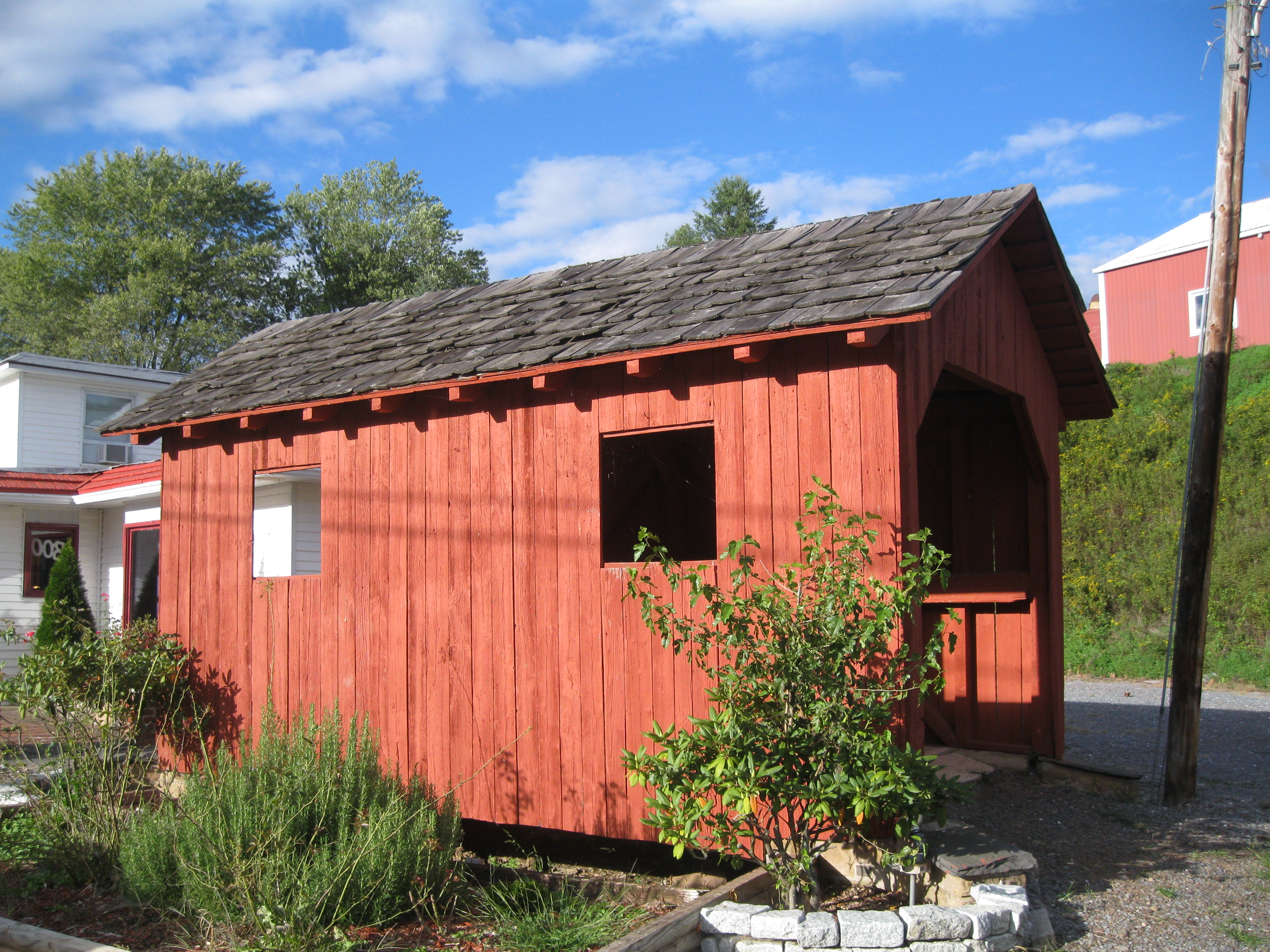
- A smaller model of the bridge, built from its wreckage

- Location within Pennsylvania Location within the United States
- Location: South of Grassmere Park, Sugarloaf Township, Pennsylvania
- Coordinates: 41°6′34″N 76°25′3″W
- Area: 0.1 acres (0.040 ha)
- Built: 1871
- Built by: Clinton & Montgomery Cole
- Architectural style: Burr Arch Truss
- MPS: Covered Bridges of Columbia and Montour Counties TR
- NRHP reference No.: 79003175

Significant dates
- Added to NRHP: November 29, 1979
- Removed from NRHP: June 27, 1986

The Welle Hess Covered Bridge No. S1, also known as the Laubach Covered Bridge, was a historic wooden covered bridge located at Sugarloaf Township in Columbia County, Pennsylvania. It was a 126-foot-long (38 m), Burr Truss arch bridge with a tin roof constructed in 1871. It crossed Fishing Creek and was one of 28 historic covered bridges in Columbia and Montour Counties.

It was listed on the National Register of Historic Places (NRHP) in 1979, but collapsed on July 19, 1981. The salvaged wreckage of the bridge was purchased by Ed Campbell, who built a small scale "replica" of the bridge at his restaurant in Orange Township in 1983. The bridge was removed from the NRHP in 1986.
