= Haupt's Mill Covered Bridge =

- Formerly listed on the U.S. National Register of Historic Places
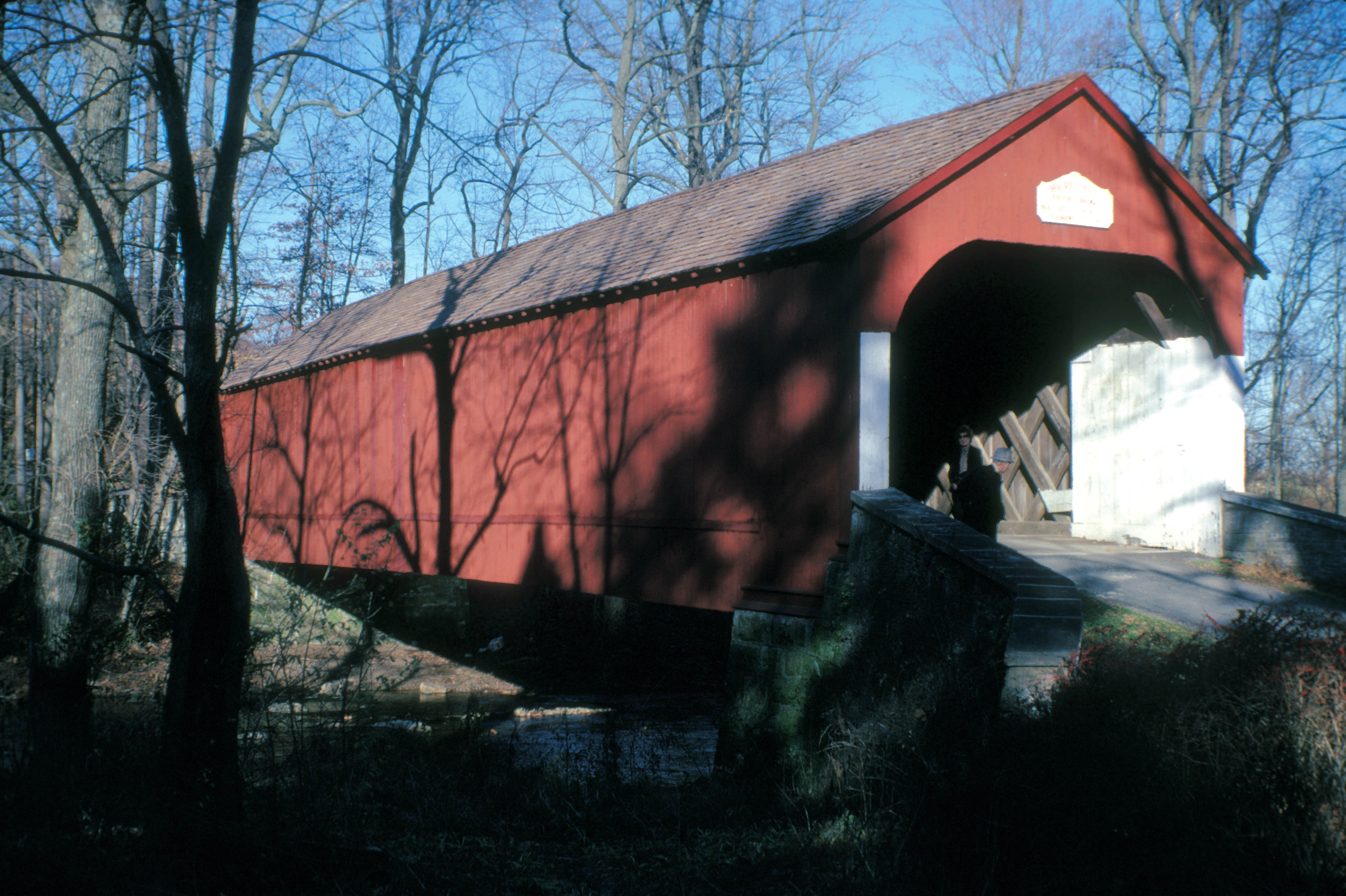

- Location within Pennsylvania Location within the United States
- Location: Legislative Route 09061 in Durham, Springfield Township, Pennsylvania
- Coordinates: 40°34′11″N 75°15′02″W
- Area: 0.1 acres (0.040 ha)
- Built: 1872
- Architectural style: Town truss
- MPS: Covered Bridges of the Delaware River Watershed TR
- NRHP reference No.: 80003446

Significant dates
- Added to NRHP: December 1, 1980
- Removed from NRHP: June 27, 1986

The Haupt's Mill Covered Bridge was an historic covered bridge that was located in Springfield Township, Bucks County, Pennsylvania. It crossed Cooks Creek.

Added to the National Register of Historic Places on December 1, 1980, it was destroyed by arson in January 1985, and subsequently removed from the register.

== History and architectural features ==
Built in 1872 in the town truss style, the Haupt's Mill Covered Bridge was 107 feet long and 15 feet wide.

It was added to the National Register of Historic Places on December 1, 1980. It was destroyed by arson in January 1985, and subsequently removed from the National Register of Historic Places.
