= North Fredericktown, Pennsylvania =

Unincorporated community in Pennsylvania, US

Coordinates: 40°00′35″N 80°00′00″W

- Unincorporated community
- Interactive map of North Fredericktown, Pennsylvania
- Country: United States
- State: Pennsylvania
- County: Washington
- Time zone: UTC-5 (Eastern (EST))
  - Summer (DST): UTC-4 (EDT)

North Fredericktown is an unincorporated community in Washington County, Pennsylvania, United States.

It is home to the Horn Davis Overholtzer Bridge.
