= Prosperity, Pennsylvania =

Unincorporated community in Pennsylvania, US

- Unincorporated community
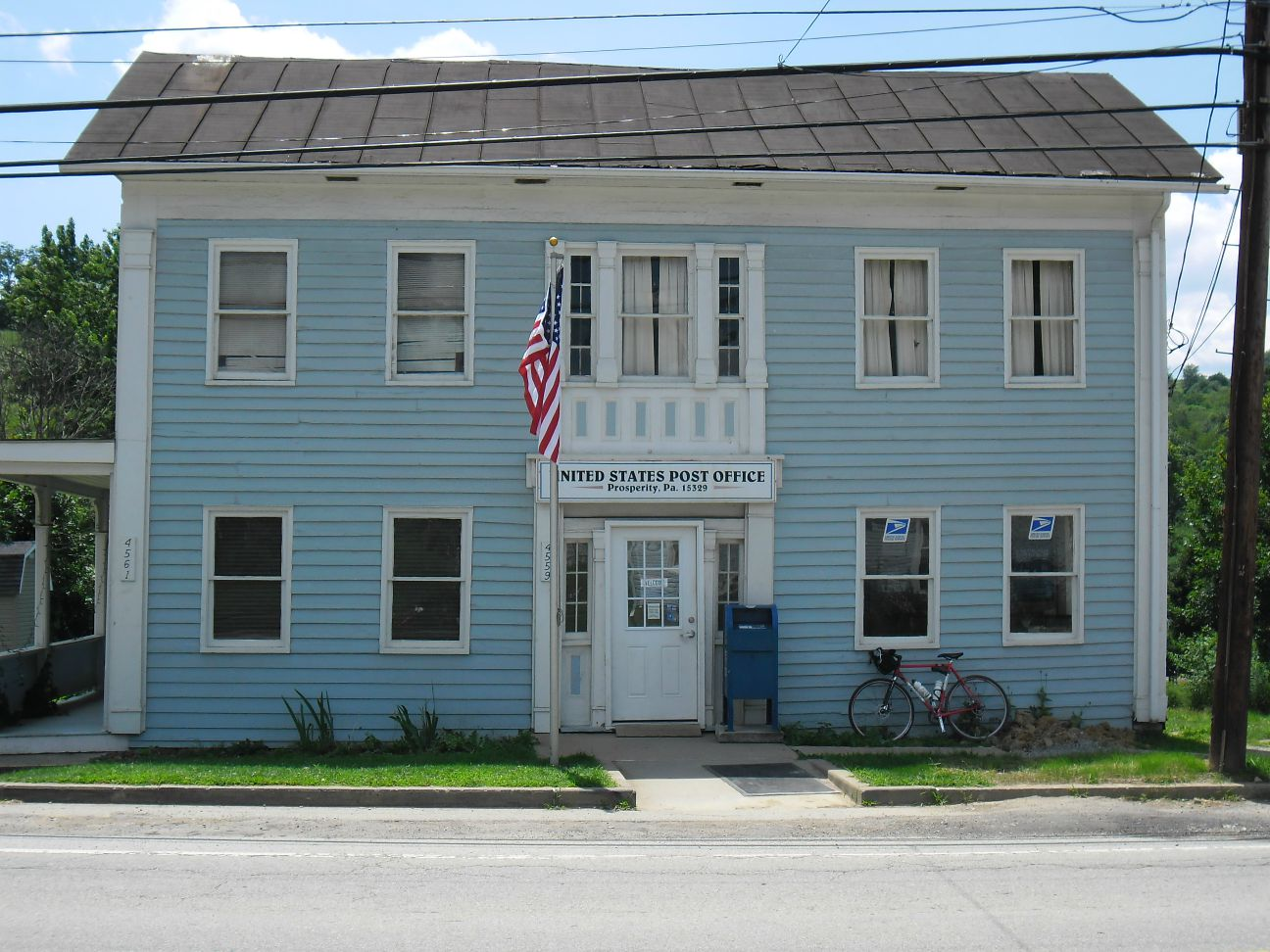
- Prosperity Post Office on Pennsylvania Route 18

- Location within Pennsylvania Location within the United States
- Coordinates: 40°02′49″N 80°17′41″W
- Country: United States
- State: Pennsylvania
- County: Washington
- Elevation: 1,037 ft (316 m)
- Time zone: UTC-5 (Eastern (EST))
  - Summer (DST): UTC-4 (EDT)
- ZIP code: 15329
- Area code: 724

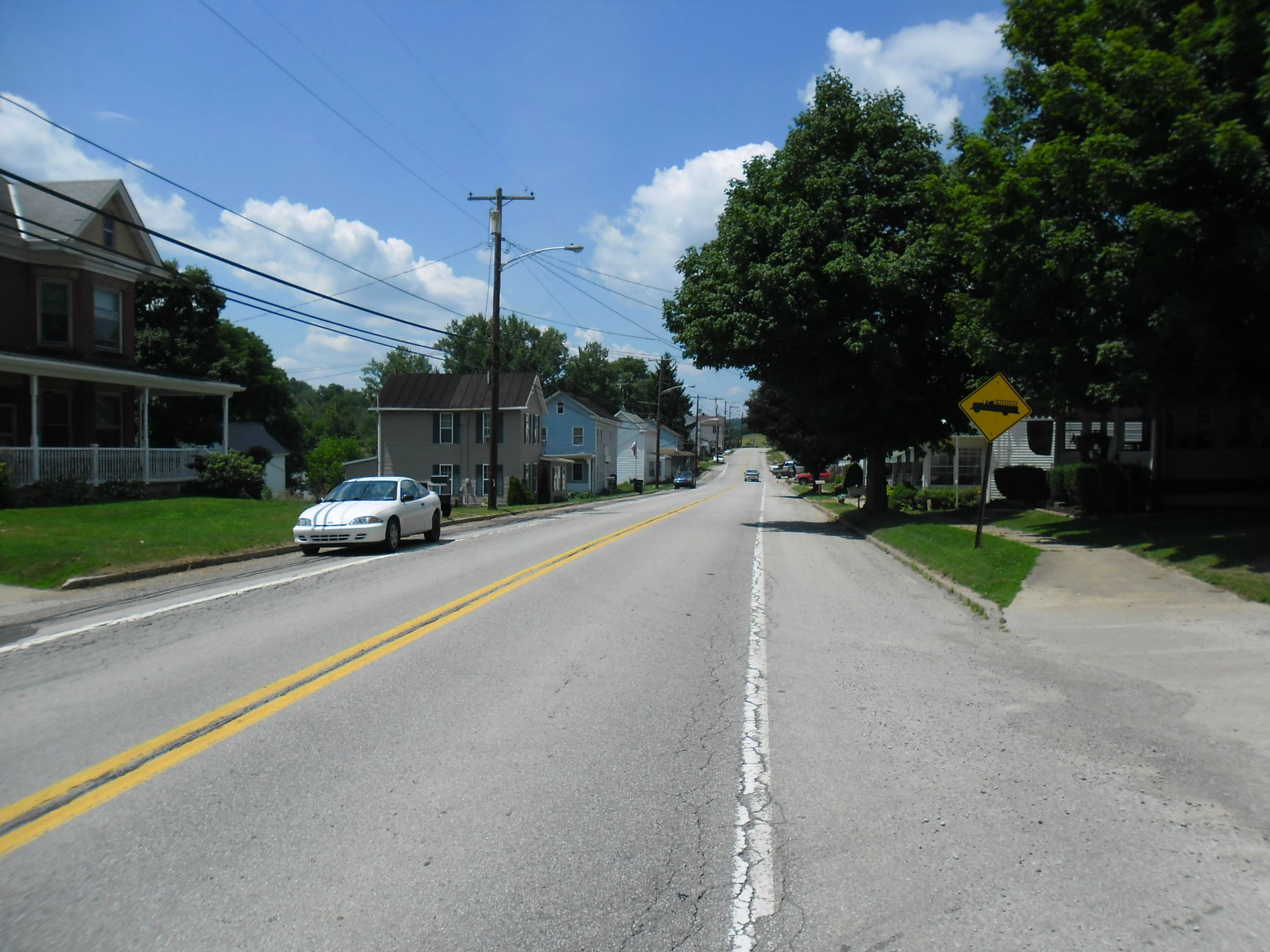
Prosperity, PA as seen from PA Route 18.

Prosperity is an unincorporated community in Morris Township, Washington County, Pennsylvania, United States.

According to tradition, the name "Prosperity" stems from the first settlers' optimism.
