= Martin's Mill Covered Bridge (Antrim Township, Franklin County, Pennsylvania) =

- U.S. National Register of Historic Places
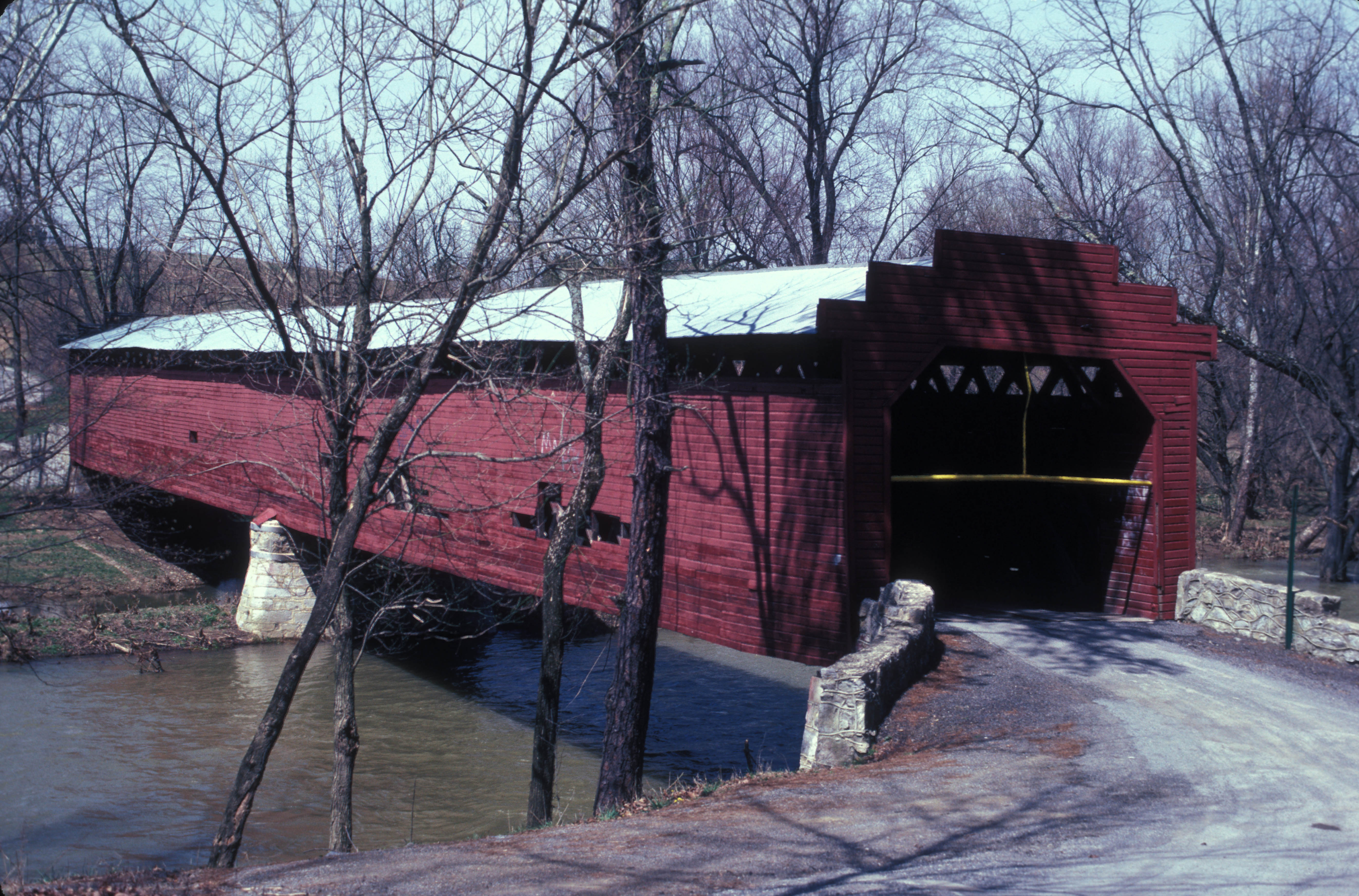

- Location within Pennsylvania Location within the United States
- Location: Southwest of Greencastle over Conococheague Creek, Antrim Township, Pennsylvania
- Coordinates: 39°45′53″N 77°46′33″W
- Area: less than one acre
- Built: 1849
- Built by: Jacob Shirk
- Architectural style: Town lattice truss
- NRHP reference No.: 74001786
- Added to NRHP: February 15, 1974

Martin's Mill Covered Bridge is a public, historic wooden covered bridge located at Antrim Township in Franklin County, Pennsylvania, United States. Martins Mill has dawn to dusk hours of 8 AM - PM. It is a 205-foot-long (62 m), Town lattice truss bridge, constructed in 1849. It crosses Conococheague Creek.

It was listed on the National Register of Historic Places in 1974.

== Gallery ==
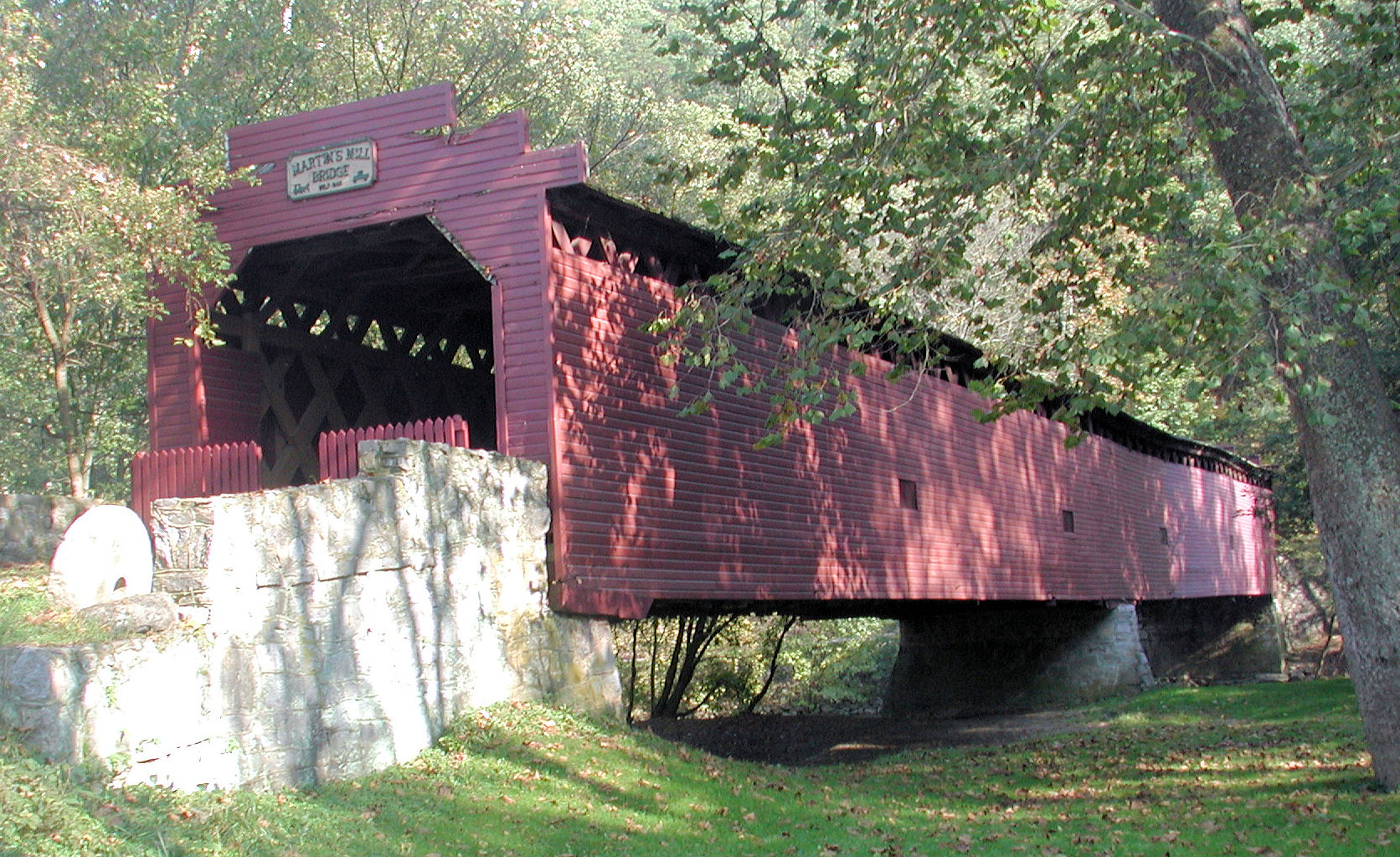

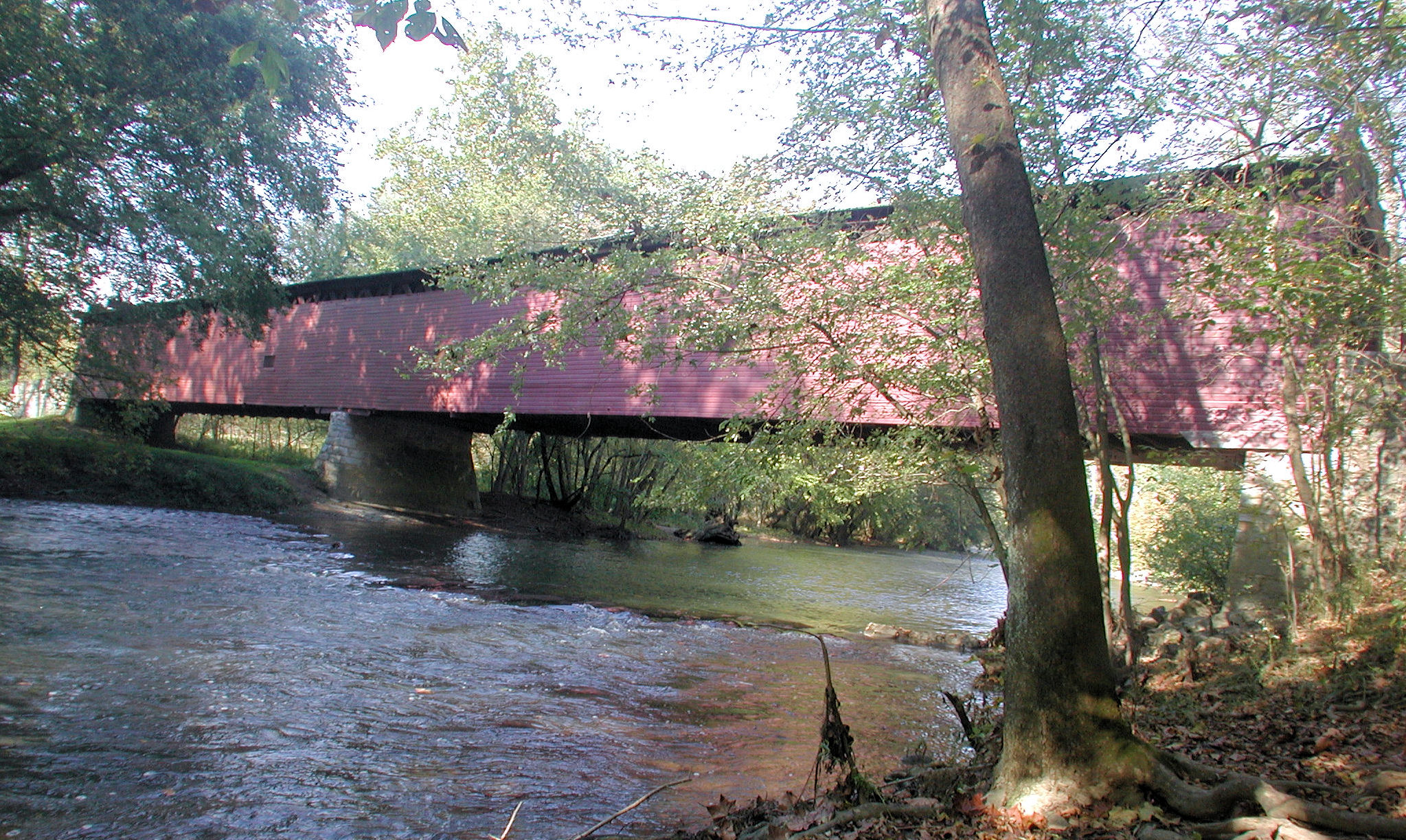

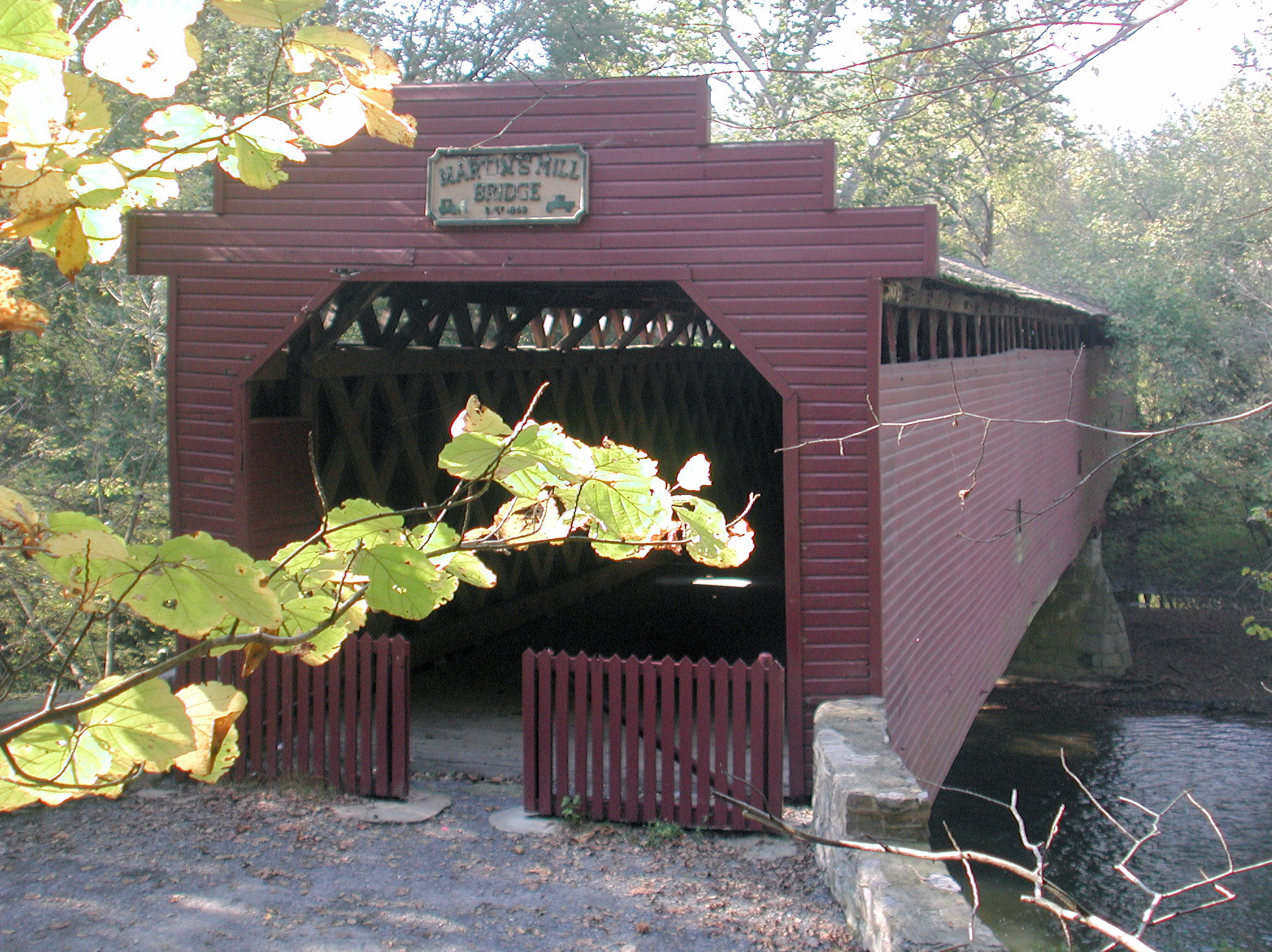
