= Burr Truss =

Truss design

Burr bridge
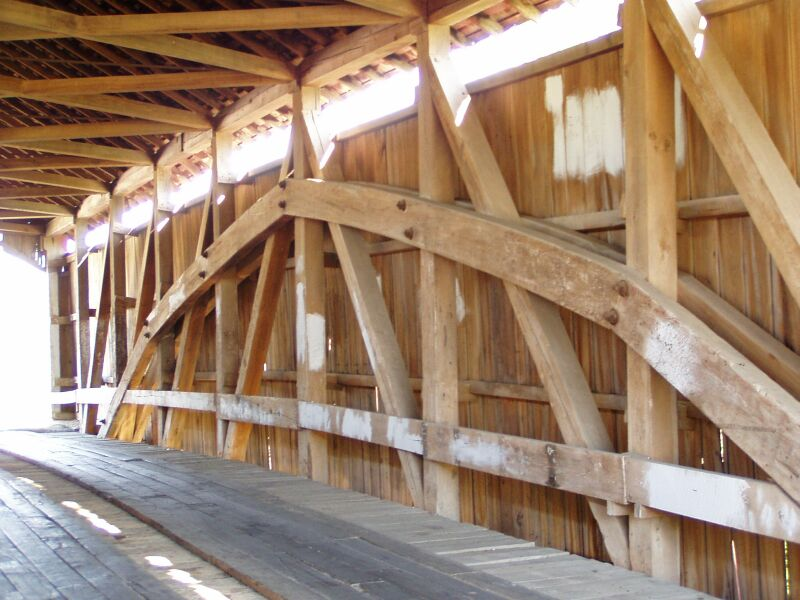
- Interior structure of a covered bridge utilizing a kingpost with a Burr Arch structure
- Span range: Short to medium
- Material: Wood planks
- Movable: No
- Design effort: medium

The Burr Arch Truss—or, simply, Burr Truss or Burr Arch—is a combination of an arch and a multiple kingpost truss design. It was invented in 1804 by Theodore Burr, patented on April 3, 1817, and used in bridges, usually covered bridges.

== Design ==
The design principle behind the Burr arch truss is that the arch should be capable of bearing the entire load on the bridge while the truss keeps the bridge rigid. Even though the kingpost truss alone is capable of bearing a load, this was done because it is impossible to evenly balance a dynamic load crossing the bridge between the two parts. The opposite view is also held, based on computer models, that the truss performs the majority of the load bearing and the arch provides the stability. Either way, the combination of the arch and the truss provides a more stable bridge capable of supporting greater weight than either the arch or truss alone.

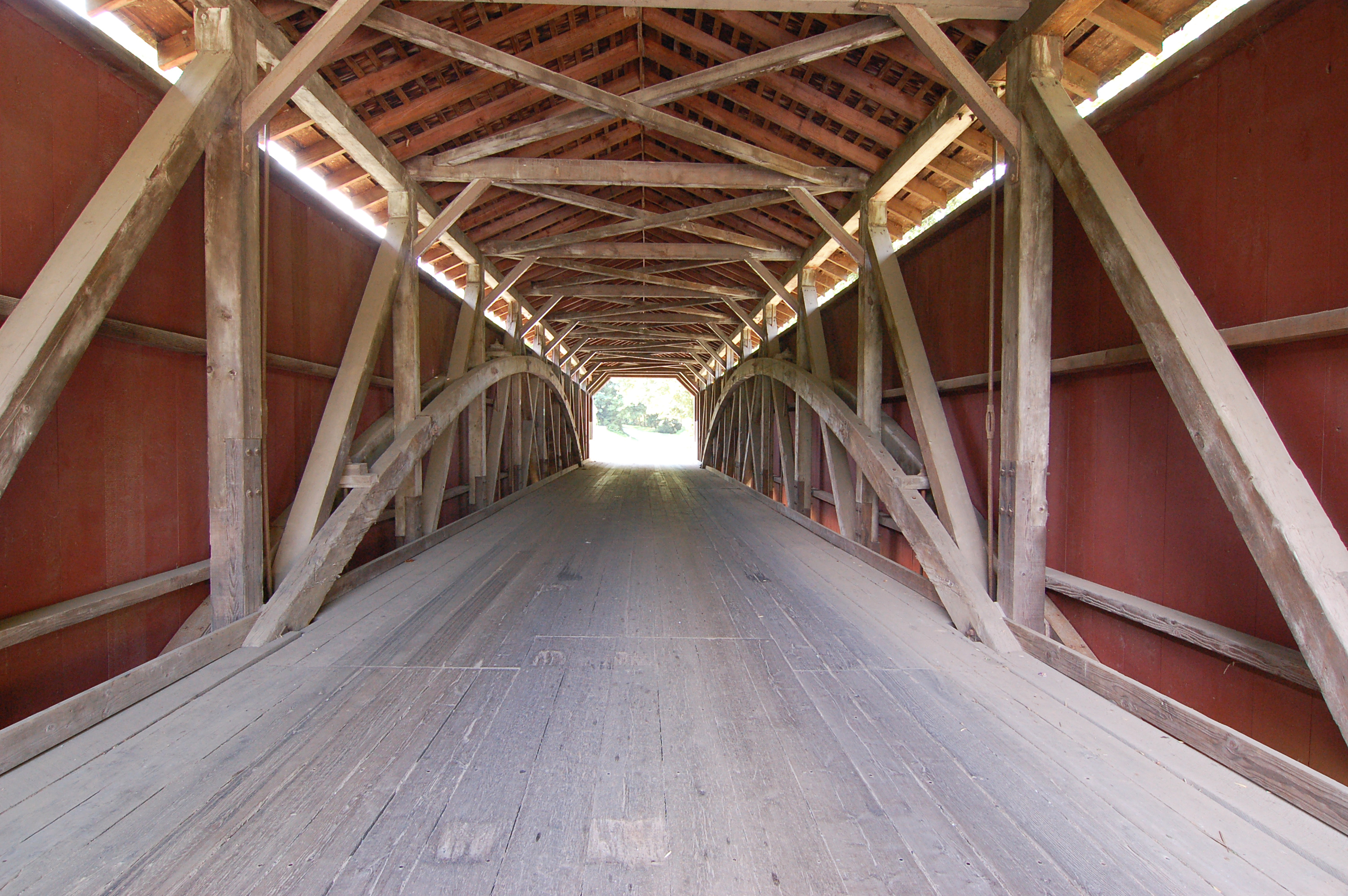
Example of a Burr Truss – Baumgardener's Covered Bridge in Lancaster County, Pennsylvania, U.S.

The U.S. state of Indiana has a large collection of Burr Truss bridges. Of its 92 extant bridges, 53 are Burr Trusses, many of which reside in Parke County.

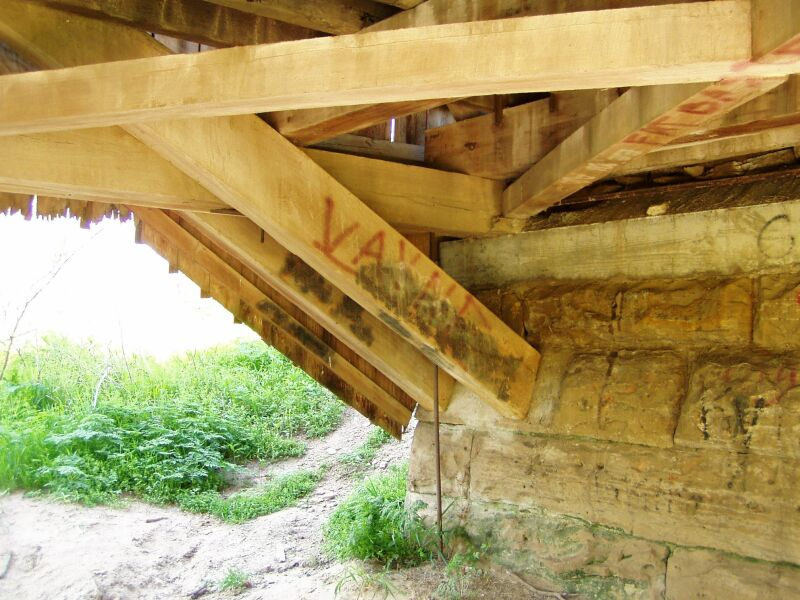
Sim Smith Covered Bridge, Parke County, Indiana. Notice the arch projects below the lower chords of the bridge.

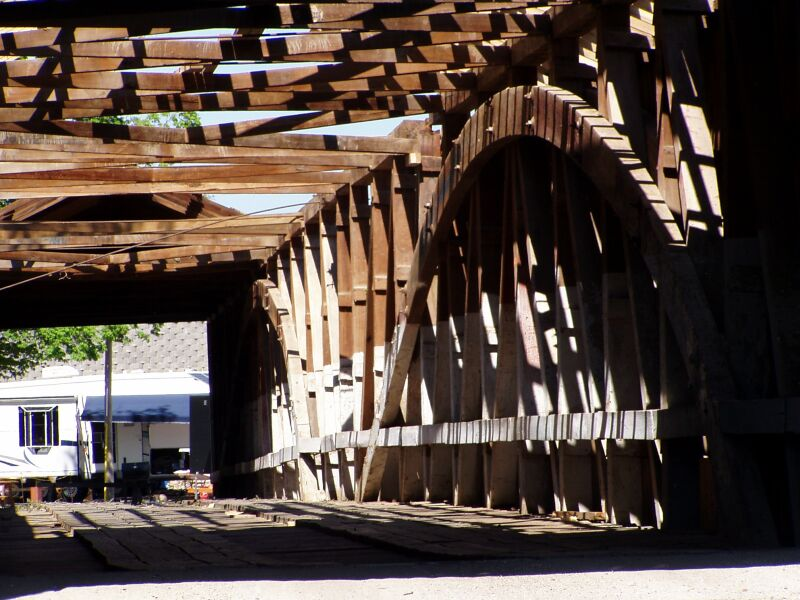
Mansfield Covered Bridge, Parke County, Indiana. The roof was missing after a major storm and the interior design was easier to see.

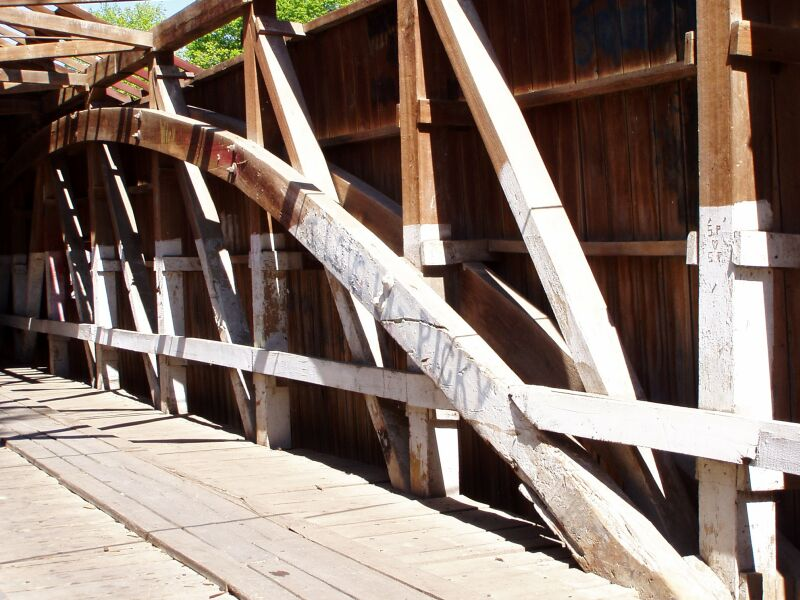
Mansfield Covered Bridge. Spans could be added to extend the bridge further than bridges of similar design.

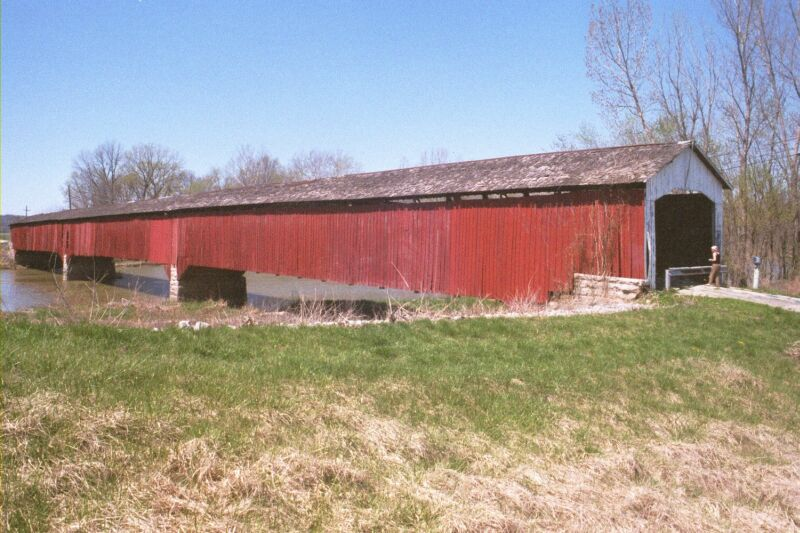
Medora Covered Bridge, Jackson County, Indiana. This is the longest covered bridge in Indiana.

== Design specification ==
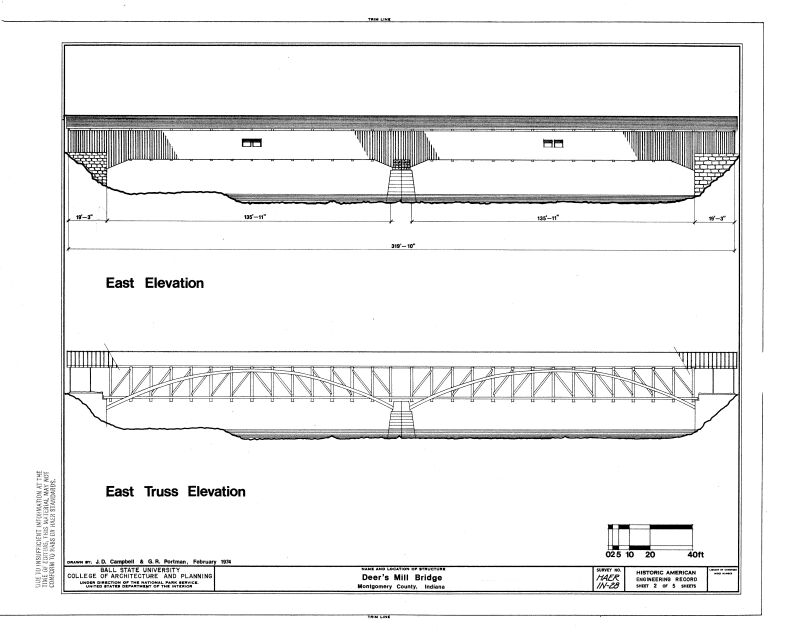
Deer Mills Covered Bridge, Montgomery County, Indiana
