= National Register of Historic Places listings in Columbia County, Pennsylvania =

Location of Columbia County in Pennsylvania

This is a list of the National Register of Historic Places listings in Columbia County, Pennsylvania.

This is intended to be a complete list of the properties and districts on the National Register of Historic Places in Columbia County, Pennsylvania, United States. The locations of National Register properties and districts for which the latitude and longitude coordinates are included below, may be seen in a map.

There are 31 properties and districts listed on the National Register in the county. Another property was once listed but has been removed.

This National Park Service list is complete through NPS recent listings posted July 11, 2025.

== Current listings ==
	Name on the Register	Image	Date listed	Location	City or town	Description
1	Berwick Armory	Berwick Armory	November 14, 1991 (#91001692)	201 Pine Street; 41°03′28″N 76°14′01″W	Berwick	
2	Bloomsburg Historic District	Bloomsburg Historic District	September 8, 1983 (#83002229)	Roughly bounded by Penn, 5th, West, Willow, Millville and Light Streets; 41°00′09″N 76°27′13″W	Bloomsburg	
3	Bridge in Fishing Creek Township	Bridge in Fishing Creek Township	June 22, 1988 (#88000738)	Legislative Route 19078 over Little Pine Creek, east of Bendertown; 41°09′05″N 76°17′45″W	Fishing Creek Township	
4	Catawissa Friends Meetinghouse	Catawissa Friends Meetinghouse	June 9, 1978 (#78002379)	South and 3rd Streets; 40°57′12″N 76°27′41″W	Catawissa	
5	Jud Christie Covered Bridge No. 95	Jud Christie Covered Bridge No. 95	November 29, 1979 (#79003184)	T-685, northeast of Millville; 41°11′45″N 76°28′24″W	Jackson and Pine Townships	
6	Creasyville Covered Bridge	Creasyville Covered Bridge	November 29, 1979 (#79003198)	T-683, northeast of Millville; 41°12′43″N 76°27′42″W	Jackson and Pine Townships	
7	Davis Covered Bridge	Davis Covered Bridge	November 29, 1979 (#79003191)	T-371, south of Catawissa; 40°54′40″N 76°26′24″W	Cleveland Township	
8	Sam Eckman Covered Bridge No. 92	Sam Eckman Covered Bridge No. 92	November 29, 1979 (#79003183)	T-548, northeast of Millville; 41°10′39″N 76°29′26″W	Greenwood and Pine Townships	
9	Fowlersville Covered Bridge	Fowlersville Covered Bridge	November 29, 1979 (#79003182)	Legislative Route 19039, south of Fowlersville; 41°03′39″N 76°17′01″W	North Centre Township	In 1986 the bridge was moved to Briar Creek Park in North Centre Township.
10	Furnace Covered Bridge No. 11	Furnace Covered Bridge No. 11	November 29, 1979 (#79003190)	T-373; 40°54′24″N 76°27′37″W	Cleveland Township	
11	Josiah Hess Covered Bridge No. 122	Josiah Hess Covered Bridge No. 122	November 29, 1979 (#79003181)	T-563, east of Forks; 41°06′53″N 76°20′23″W	Fishing Creek Township	
12	Hollingshead Covered Bridge No. 40	Hollingshead Covered Bridge No. 40	November 29, 1979 (#79003187)	T-405, east of Catawissa; 40°57′06″N 76°26′52″W	Catawissa Township	
13	Jackson Mansion and Carriage House	Jackson Mansion and Carriage House	September 5, 1985 (#85001965)	344 Market Street; 41°03′27″N 76°14′07″W	Berwick	
14	Johnson Covered Bridge No. 28	Johnson Covered Bridge No. 28	November 29, 1979 (#79003185)	T-320, south of Catawissa; 40°52′40″N 76°29′02″W	Cleveland Township	
15	Lawrence L. Knoebel Covered Bridge	Lawrence L. Knoebel Covered Bridge	August 8, 1979 (#79002309)	Knoebel's Grove; 40°52′38″N 76°30′21″W	Cleveland Township	Extends into Ralpho Township in Northumberland County
16	Kramer Covered Bridge No. 113	Kramer Covered Bridge No. 113	November 29, 1979 (#79003194)	T-572, southwest of Rohrsburg; 41°07′16″N 76°25′56″W	Greenwood Township	The bridge was "totally rebuilt in 2007".
17	Kreigbaum Covered Bridge	Kreigbaum Covered Bridge	August 8, 1979 (#79002316)	East of Elysburg on Township 459; 40°50′51″N 76°30′29″W	Cleveland Township	Extends into Ralpho Township in Northumberland County
18	Parr's Mill Covered Bridge No. 10	Parr's Mill Covered Bridge No. 10	November 29, 1979 (#79003189)	T-371 at Parr's Mill; 40°54′23″N 76°28′23″W	Cleveland Township and Franklin Township	
19	Patterson Covered Bridge No. 112	Patterson Covered Bridge No. 112	November 29, 1979 (#79003193)	T-575, north of Orangeville; 41°06′34″N 76°25′03″W	Orange Township	
20	Richards Covered Bridge	Richards Covered Bridge	August 8, 1979 (#79002308)	East of Elysburg on Township 804; 40°52′03″N 76°30′29″W	Cleveland Township	Extends into Ralpho Township in Northumberland County
21	Riegel Covered Bridge No. 6	Riegel Covered Bridge No. 6	November 29, 1979 (#79003196)	T-312, southwest of Catawissa; 40°54′44″N 76°30′49″W	Franklin Township	The bridge was destroyed in an arson fire on May 30, 1979.
22	Rohrbach Covered Bridge No. 24	Rohrbach Covered Bridge No. 24	November 29, 1979 (#79003197)	T-369, southwest of Catawissa; 40°54′00″N 76°30′43″W	Franklin Township	The bridge was dismantled in October 1986 and the pieces are in storage at Knoebels Amusement Resort.
23	Rupert Covered Bridge No. 56	Rupert Covered Bridge No. 56	November 29, 1979 (#79003186)	T-449 at Rupert; 40°58′53″N 76°28′23″W	Bloomsburg and Montour Township	
24	Shoemaker Covered Bridge	Shoemaker Covered Bridge	November 29, 1979 (#79003192)	Legislative Route 19053, north of Iola; 41°09′05″N 76°32′11″W	Pine Township	
25	Snyder Covered Bridge No. 17	Snyder Covered Bridge No. 17	November 29, 1979 (#79003188)	T-361, southeast of Slabtown; 40°54′05″N 76°23′41″W	Locust Township	
26	Stillwater Covered Bridge No. 134	Stillwater Covered Bridge No. 134	November 29, 1979 (#79003177)	T-629; 41°09′07″N 76°21′39″W	Stillwater	
27	Twin Bridges-East Paden Covered Bridge No. 120	Twin Bridges-East Paden Covered Bridge No. 120	November 29, 1979 (#79003180)	Off Pennsylvania Route 487, east of Forks; 41°06′25″N 76°21′25″W	Fishing Creek Township	
28	Twin Bridges-West Paden Covered Bridge No. 121	Twin Bridges-West Paden Covered Bridge No. 121	November 29, 1979 (#79003179)	Off Pennsylvania Route 487, east of Forks; 41°06′25″N 76°21′25″W	Fishing Creek Township	The bridge was destroyed in a flood on June 28, 2006, and an identical replacement was built and dedicated on October 15, 2008.
29	Wagner Covered Bridge No. 19	Wagner Covered Bridge No. 19	November 29, 1979 (#79003178)	T-468; 40°59′56″N 76°28′58″W	Locust Township	The bridge was dismantled on March 23, 1981, and the pieces stored at Knoebels Amusement Resort until it was rebuilt at the entrance to a housing development in Hemlock Township in 1994.
30	Wanich Covered Bridge No. 69	Wanich Covered Bridge No. 69	November 29, 1979 (#79003195)	Off Pennsylvania Route 42, north of Fernville; 41°02′23″N 76°29′01″W	Hemlock and Mount Pleasant Townships	
31	Y Covered Bridge No. 156	Y Covered Bridge No. 156	November 29, 1979 (#79003176)	T-757, southeast of Central; 41°17′23″N 76°21′52″W	Sugarloaf Township	The bridge was destroyed in a suspicious fire on August 15, 1983.

== Former listing ==
	Name on the Register	Image	Date listed	Date removed	Location	City or town	Description
1	Welle Hess Covered Bridge No. S1	Welle Hess Covered Bridge No. S1	November 29, 1979 (#79003175)	June 27, 1986	South of Grassmere Park	Sugarloaf Township	The bridge collapsed on July 19, 1981, and was removed from the NRHP in 1986. Photo is of a model constructed from original bridge materials.

== See also ==
- List of National Historic Landmarks in Pennsylvania
- National Register of Historic Places listings in Pennsylvania
- List of Pennsylvania state historical markers in Columbia County
