= National Register of Historic Places listings in Northumberland County, Pennsylvania =

Location of Northumberland County in Pennsylvania

This is a list of the National Register of Historic Places listings in Northumberland County, Pennsylvania.

This is intended to be a complete list of the properties and districts on National Register of Historic Places in Northumberland County, Pennsylvania. The locations of National Register properties and districts for which the latitude and longitude coordinates are included below, may be seen in a map.

There are 30 properties and districts listed on the National Register in the county. One site is further designated as a National Historic Landmark. Another property was once listed but has been removed.

This National Park Service list is complete through NPS recent listings posted May 1, 2026.

== Current listings ==
	Name on the Register	Image	Date listed	Location	City or town	Description
1	Allenwood River Bridge	Allenwood River Bridge	June 22, 1988 (#88000865)	Legislative Route 460 over the West Branch of the Susquehanna River; 41°06′28″N 76°53′25″W	Delaware Township	Bridge was replaced with a new structure in 1990. It extended into Gregg Township in Union County
2	Beck House	Beck House	January 11, 1976 (#76001659)	62 North Front Street; 40°51′50″N 76°47′46″W	Sunbury	
3	Gottlieb Brown Covered Bridge	Gottlieb Brown Covered Bridge	August 8, 1979 (#79002311)	East of Potts Grove on Township 594; 41°00′06″N 76°46′26″W	East Chillisquaque Township	Extends into Liberty Township in Montour County
4	Col. James Cameron House	Col. James Cameron House	May 5, 1989 (#89000360)	Pennsylvania Route 405/River Road, southeast of Milton; 41°00′08″N 76°51′43″W	West Chillisquaque Township	
5	Dauphin County Bridge No. 27	Dauphin County Bridge No. 27	August 2, 1993 (#93000720)	Deibler's Dam Road (Mahantango Creek Road) across Mahantango Creek; 40°38′05″N 76°51′23″W	Lower Mahanoy Township	Extends into Mifflin Township in Dauphin County. Photo shows replacement bridge
6	Himmel's Church Covered Bridge	Himmel's Church Covered Bridge	August 8, 1979 (#79002312)	Northeast of Rebuck on Township 442; 40°43′23″N 76°43′12″W	Washington Township	
7	Hopper-Snyder Homestead	Hopper-Snyder Homestead	July 3, 1979 (#79002315)	Northeast of Watsontown off Pennsylvania Route 49061; 41°05′39″N 76°51′21″W	Delaware Township	
8	Hower-Slote House	Hower-Slote House	August 22, 1979 (#79002314)	West of Turbotville; 41°06′06″N 76°47′45″W	Lewis Township	
9	Keefer Station Covered Bridge	Keefer Station Covered Bridge	August 8, 1979 (#79002313)	East of Sunbury on Township 698; 40°52′14″N 76°43′25″W	Upper Augusta Township	
10	William Kirk House	William Kirk House	December 2, 1980 (#80003590)	West of Turbotville; 41°05′56″N 76°48′43″W	Delaware Township	
11	Lawrence L. Knoebel Covered Bridge	Lawrence L. Knoebel Covered Bridge	August 8, 1979 (#79002309)	Knoebel's Grove; 40°52′38″N 76°30′21″W	Ralpho Township	Extends into Cleveland Township in Columbia County
12	Kreigbaum Covered Bridge	Kreigbaum Covered Bridge	August 8, 1979 (#79002316)	East of Elysburg on Township 459; 40°50′51″N 76°30′29″W	Ralpho Township	Extends into Cleveland Township in Columbia County
13	Milton Armory	Milton Armory	July 12, 1991 (#91000905)	133 Ridge Avenue; 41°01′01″N 76°50′58″W	Milton	
14	Milton Freight Station	Milton Freight Station	April 13, 1977 (#77001180)	90 Broadway; 41°01′10″N 76°51′08″W	Milton	
15	Milton Historic District	Milton Historic District	July 24, 1986 (#86001933)	Roughly bounded by 8th and Upper Market Streets, Spruce Avenue, and Stanton, High and Apple Streets, and the Susquehanna River; 41°01′20″N 76°50′59″W	Milton	
16	Northumberland County Courthouse	Northumberland County Courthouse	December 30, 1974 (#74001800)	207 Market Street; 40°51′42″N 76°47′43″W	Sunbury	
17	Northumberland Historic District	Northumberland Historic District	November 18, 1988 (#88002313)	Roughly bounded by Fourth and A Streets, the North Shore Railroad, and Wheatley Avenue; 40°53′26″N 76°47′39″W	Northumberland	
18	Pennsylvania Canal and Limestone Run Aqueduct	Pennsylvania Canal and Limestone Run Aqueduct	December 19, 1978 (#78002438)	Bounded by Broadway, Filbert Street, Limestone Run, and Bound Avenue; 41°01′07″N 76°51′13″W	Milton	
19	Dr. Joseph Priestley House	Dr. Joseph Priestley House	September 11, 1981 (#81000554)	100 King Street; 40°53′20″N 76°47′37″W	Northumberland	
20	Joseph Priestley House	Joseph Priestley House	October 15, 1966 (#66000673)	Priestley Avenue; 40°53′24″N 76°47′25″W	Northumberland	
21	Richards Covered Bridge	Richards Covered Bridge	August 8, 1979 (#79002308)	East of Elysburg on Township 804; 40°52′03″N 76°30′29″W	Ralpho Township	Extends into Cleveland Township in Columbia County
22	Rishel Covered Bridge	Rishel Covered Bridge	August 8, 1979 (#79002310)	East of Montandon on Township 573; 40°57′37″N 76°48′58″W	East and West Chillisquaque Townships	
23	Sixth Ward School		April 4, 2025 (#100011609)	700 North Fourth Street; 40°52′08″N 76°47′13″W	Sunbury	
24	Caspar Snyder House	Caspar Snyder House	November 24, 1978 (#09000101)	Pennsylvania Route 47, south of Sunbury; 40°46′53″N 76°50′31″W	Lower Augusta Township	
25	Sodom Schoolhouse	Sodom Schoolhouse	February 12, 1974 (#74001799)	East of Montandon on Pennsylvania Route 45; 40°57′57″N 76°49′38″W	West Chillisquaque Township	
26	Sunbury Armory	Sunbury Armory	December 22, 1989 (#89002082)	Catawissa Avenue, northeast of Sunbury; 40°52′22″N 76°46′40″W	Upper Augusta Township	
27	Sunbury Historic District	Sunbury Historic District	November 3, 1983 (#83004240)	Roughly bounded by Arch, Chestnut, Front, and 5th Streets; 40°51′42″N 76°47′37″W	Sunbury	
28	Warrior Run Presbyterian Church	Warrior Run Presbyterian Church	April 2, 1973 (#73001659)	North of McEwensville on Pennsylvania Route 147; 41°05′55″N 76°48′25″W	Delaware Township	
29	Watsontown River Bridge	Watsontown River Bridge	June 22, 1988 (#88000801)	Legislative Route 240 spur over the West Branch of the Susquehanna River; 41°04′51″N 76°51′55″W	Watsontown	Extends into White Deer Township in Union County
30	Zion Stone Church	Zion Stone Church	November 1, 1984 (#84000267)	Tulpehocken Road in Augustaville; 40°48′12″N 76°44′29″W	Rockefeller Township	

== Former listing ==
	Name on the Register	Image	Date listed	Date removed	Location	City or town	Description
1	Victoria Theatre		November 21, 1985 (#85002907)	May 18, 2004	46 West Independence Street	Shamokin	Demolished on July 8, 1999.

== See also ==
- List of National Historic Landmarks in Pennsylvania
- National Register of Historic Places listings in Pennsylvania
- List of Pennsylvania state historical markers in Northumberland County
