= List of covered bridges in Columbia County, Pennsylvania =

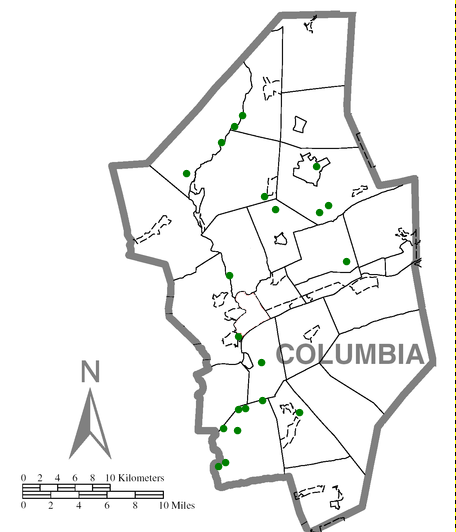
The green dots are the approximate locations of the covered bridges

As of 2007, there are a total of 21 covered bridges in Columbia County, Pennsylvania, in the United States. The number of covered bridges in Columbia County is the third highest number of covered bridges in any one county in Pennsylvania, behind Washington County and Lancaster County. Columbia County is also home to one of two sets of twin covered bridges in the United States.

By 1962, a large number of the covered bridges in Columbia County were experiencing weathering. During this year, Columbia County began working on the preservation of the damaged bridges.

There is an organization known as the Columbia County Covered Bridges Association that has existed since 1991 and supports the presence of covered bridges in the county. The county commissioner of Columbia County, Chris Young, is also a supporter of Columbia County's covered bridges, stating that "When you stand on a covered bridge, you're actually going back in time". 18 of the covered bridges are open to vehicle traffic, as of 2002, and these are maintained by officials of Columbia County. The remainder of the bridges are maintained by the Columbia County Covered Bridges Association. A number of the covered bridges are attractions for local and regional tourism. They are also used for picnics and fishing.

A number of the covered bridges were damaged during Tropical Storm Lee in 2011. Three of these bridges were the Josiah Hess Covered Bridge No. 122, the Davis Covered Bridge, and the Rupert Covered Bridge No. 56. The Josiah Hess Covered Bridge No. 122 received some damage to its abutments. The Davis Covered Bridge was closed after the tropical storm. The Rupert Covered Bridge No. 56 sustained minor damage from a tree branch that went through its side.

== Statistics and history ==
The existing covered bridges in Columbia County are spread across at least 11 townships. Out of these, four are in Fishing Creek Township, five are in Cleveland Township, two are in Greenwood Township, two are in Jackson Township, and two are in Franklin Township. The rest of the townships in Columbia County have one or zero covered bridges.

While fewer than 20 covered bridges remain in Columbia County in the 21st century, a total of 116 covered bridges have been built in the county, meaning that 97 covered bridges in the county have been destroyed. Of these, nine were destroyed in the 1800s, including one, the Berwick-Nescopeck Covered Bridge, that was destroyed in the late 1830s. Considerably more covered bridges were destroyed in the 1900s. In this century, a total of 60 covered bridges were lost. Two more covered bridges were destroyed in the 21st century. Additionally, 17 covered bridges were lost at an unknown date.

== Table ==
Name	Date built	Length	Type	Stream crossed	Image	Source
Creasyville Covered Bridge	1881	44.5 feet (13.6 m)	Queen post truss	Little Fishing Creek		
Davis Covered Bridge	1875	87 feet (27 m)	Burr arch truss	Roaring Creek		
Esther Furnace Covered Bridge	1881	101 feet (31 m)	Queen post	Roaring Creek		
Fowlersville Covered Bridge	1886	40 feet (12 m)	Queen post	West Branch Briar Creek (later moved)		
Hollingshead Covered Bridge No. 40	1851	116 feet (35 m)	Burr arch truss	Catawissa Creek		
Johnson Covered Bridge No. 28	1882	61 feet (19 m)	Queen truss	Mugser Run		
Josiah Hess Covered Bridge No. 122	1875	110 feet (34 m)	Burr arch truss	Huntington Creek		
Jud Christie Covered Bridge No. 95	1876	63 feet (19 m)	Queen post truss	Little Fishing Creek		
Lawrence L. Knoebel Covered Bridge	1881	41 feet (12 m)	Queen truss	West Creek (later moved)		
Kramer Covered Bridge No. 113	1881	50 feet (15 m)	Queen post	Mud Run		
Kreigbaum Covered Bridge	1876	62 feet (19 m)	Queen post	South Branch Roaring Creek		
Parr's Mill Covered Bridge No. 10	1866	84 feet (26 m)	Burr arch truss	Roaring Creek		
Patterson Covered Bridge No. 112	1875	82 feet (25 m)	Burr arch truss	Green Creek		
Richards Covered Bridge	1880	64 feet (20 m)	Modified multiple kingpost	South Branch Roaring Creek		
Rupert Covered Bridge No. 56	1847	185 feet (56 m)	Burr arch truss	Fishing Creek		
Sam Eckman Covered Bridge No. 92	1876	66 feet (20 m)	Queen post truss	Little Fishing Creek		
Shoemaker Covered Bridge	1881	49 feet (15 m)	Queen post truss	West Branch Run		
Snyder Covered Bridge No. 17	1876	60.2 feet (18.3 m)	Burr arch truss or Queen post truss	Roaring Creek		
Stillwater Covered Bridge No. 134	1849	151 feet (46 m)	Burr arch truss	Fishing Creek		
Twin Bridges-East Paden Covered Bridge No. 120	1884	112 feet (34 m) and 75 feet (23 m)	Queen post and Burr arch	Huntington Creek		
Wanich Covered Bridge No. 69	1844	98 feet (30 m)	Burr arch truss	Little Fishing Creek		

== See also ==
- List of covered bridges on the National Register of Historic Places in Pennsylvania
- List of covered bridges in Lancaster County, Pennsylvania
- List of covered bridges of Bradford, Sullivan and Lycoming Counties
- National Register of Historic Places
