= National Register of Historic Places listings in Pennsylvania =

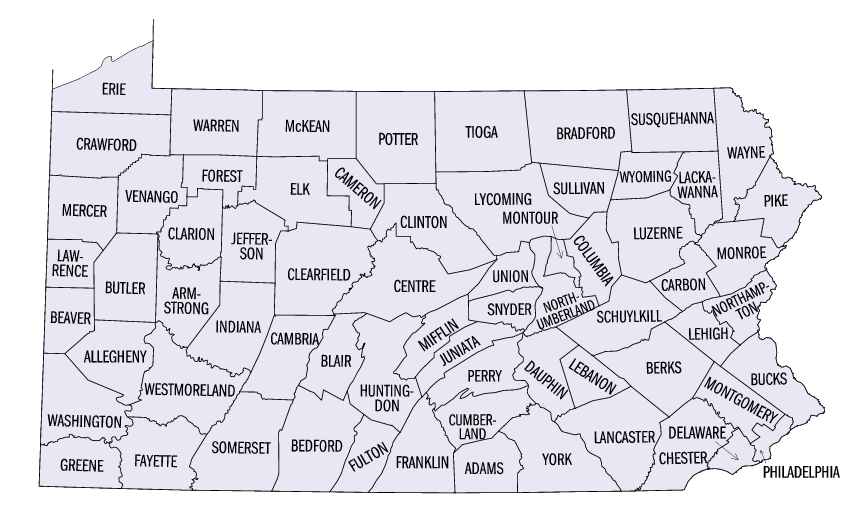
Pennsylvania counties (clickable map)

As of 2015, there are over 3,000 sites in the U.S. state of Pennsylvania listed on the National Register of Historic Places. All 67 counties in Pennsylvania have listings on the National Register.

This National Park Service list is complete through NPS recent listings posted September 4, 2026.

== Current listings by county ==
The following are approximate tallies of current listings in Pennsylvania on the National Register of Historic Places. These counts are based on entries in the National Register Information Database as of April 24, 2008 and new weekly listings posted since then on the National Register of Historic Places web site. There are frequent additions to the listings and occasional delistings and the counts here are not official. Also, the counts in this table exclude boundary increase and decrease listings which modify the area covered by an existing property or district and which carry a separate National Register reference number. 16 percent of the NRHP's in Pennsylvania are in Philadelphia, and nearly 40 percent are located within the Philadelphia metropolitan area.

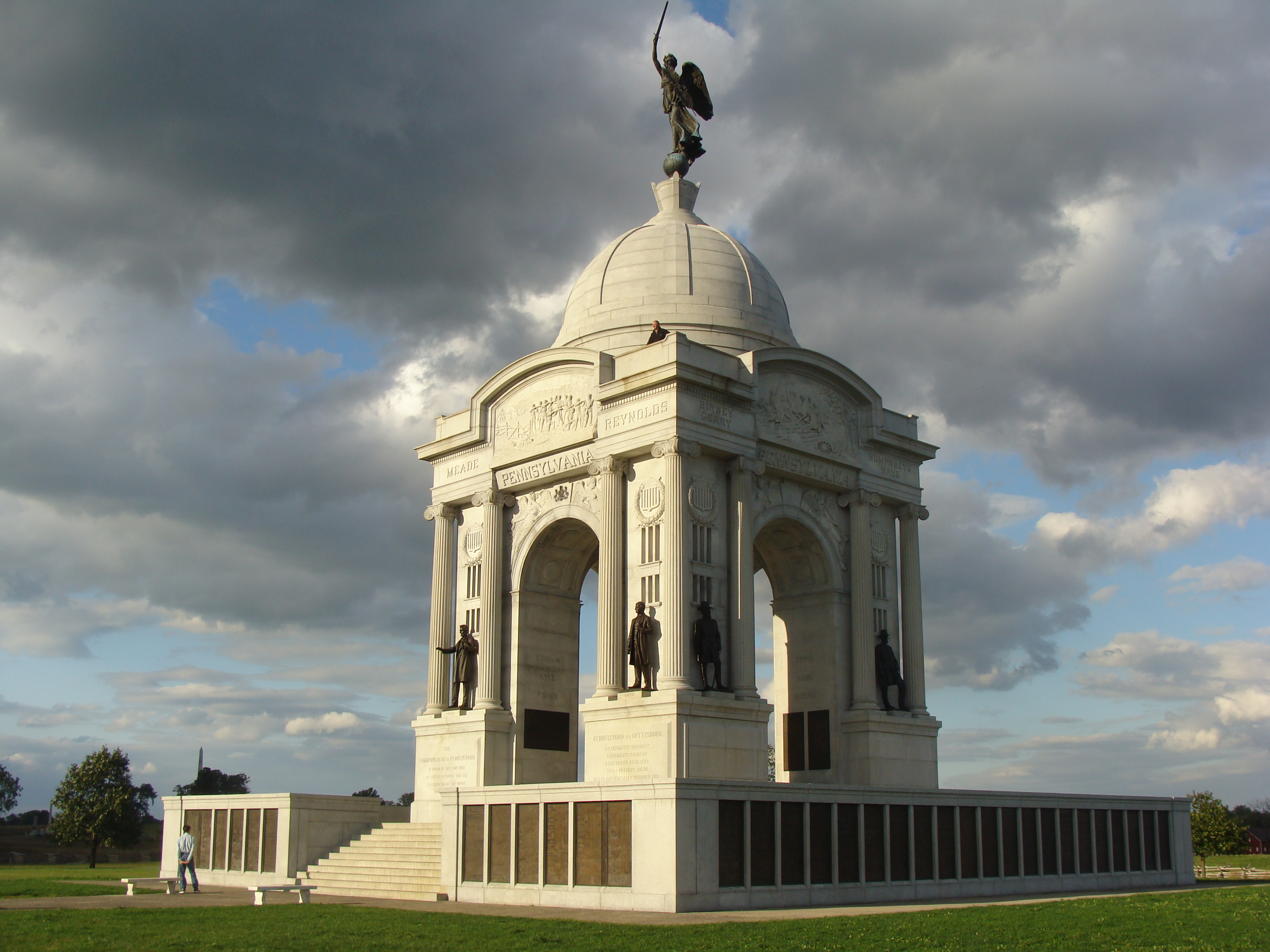
Gettysburg National Military Park, Adams County

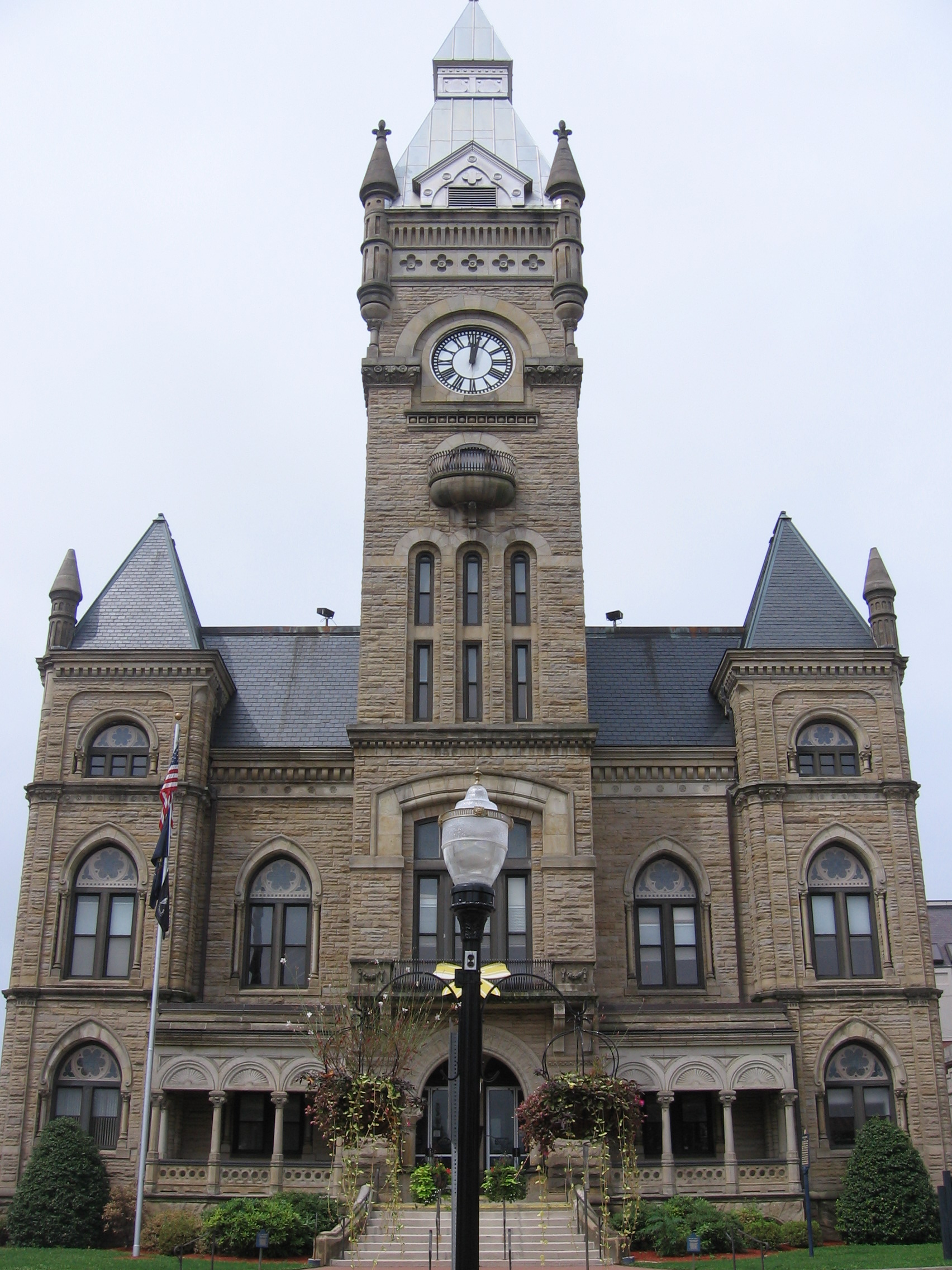
Butler County Courthouse, Butler County

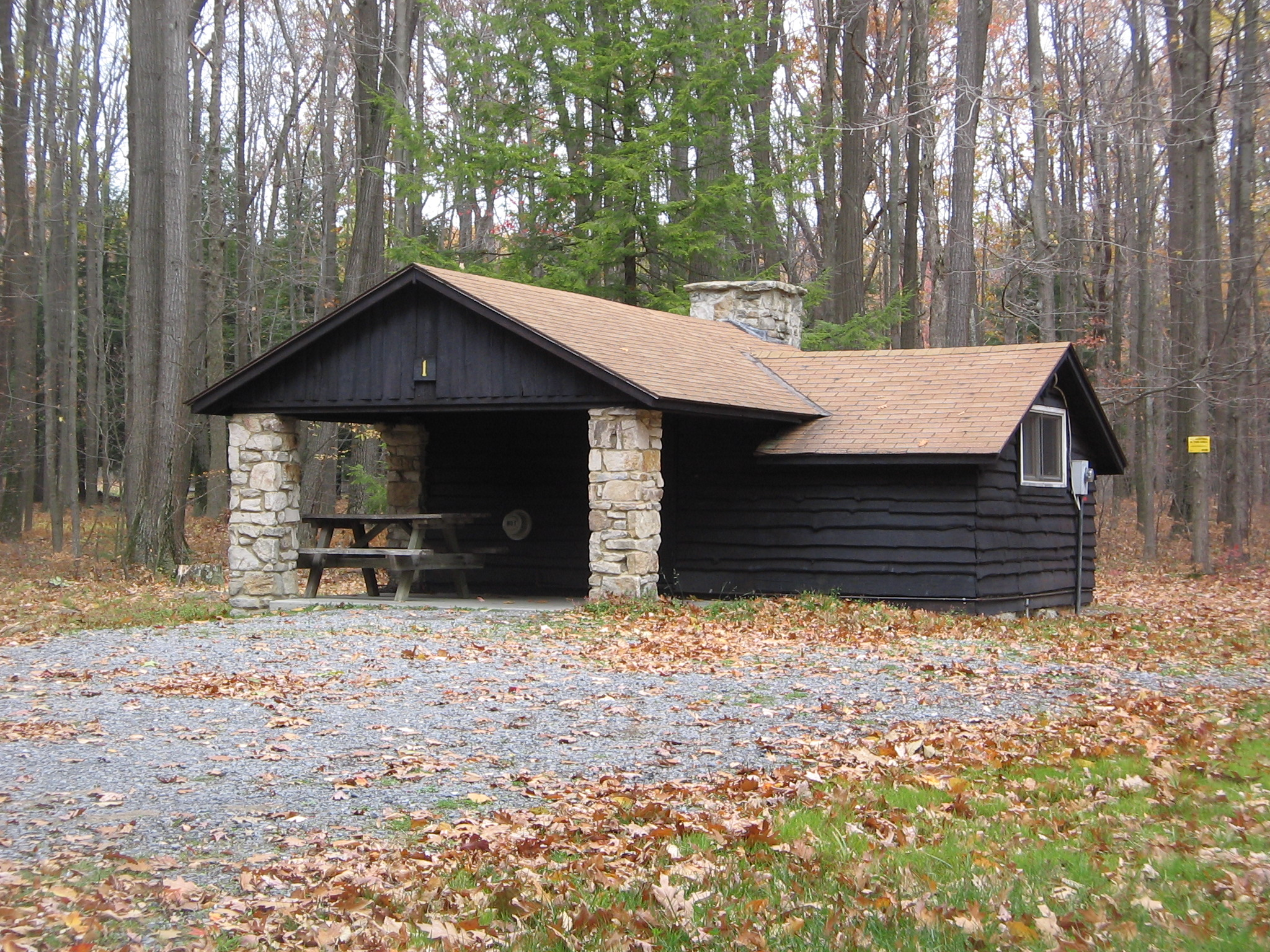
S. B. Elliott State Park Family Cabin District, Clearfield County

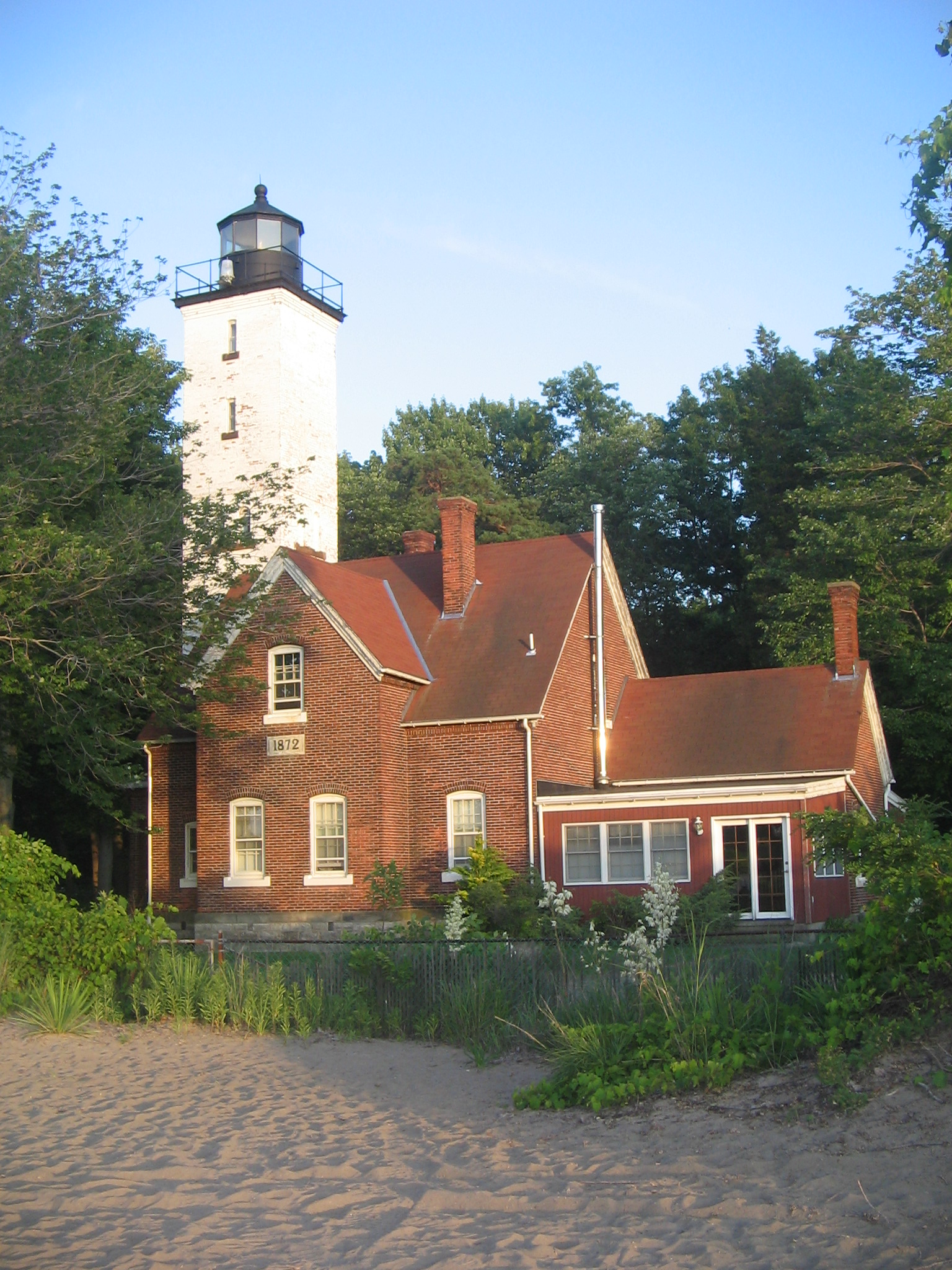
Presque Isle Lighthouse, Erie County

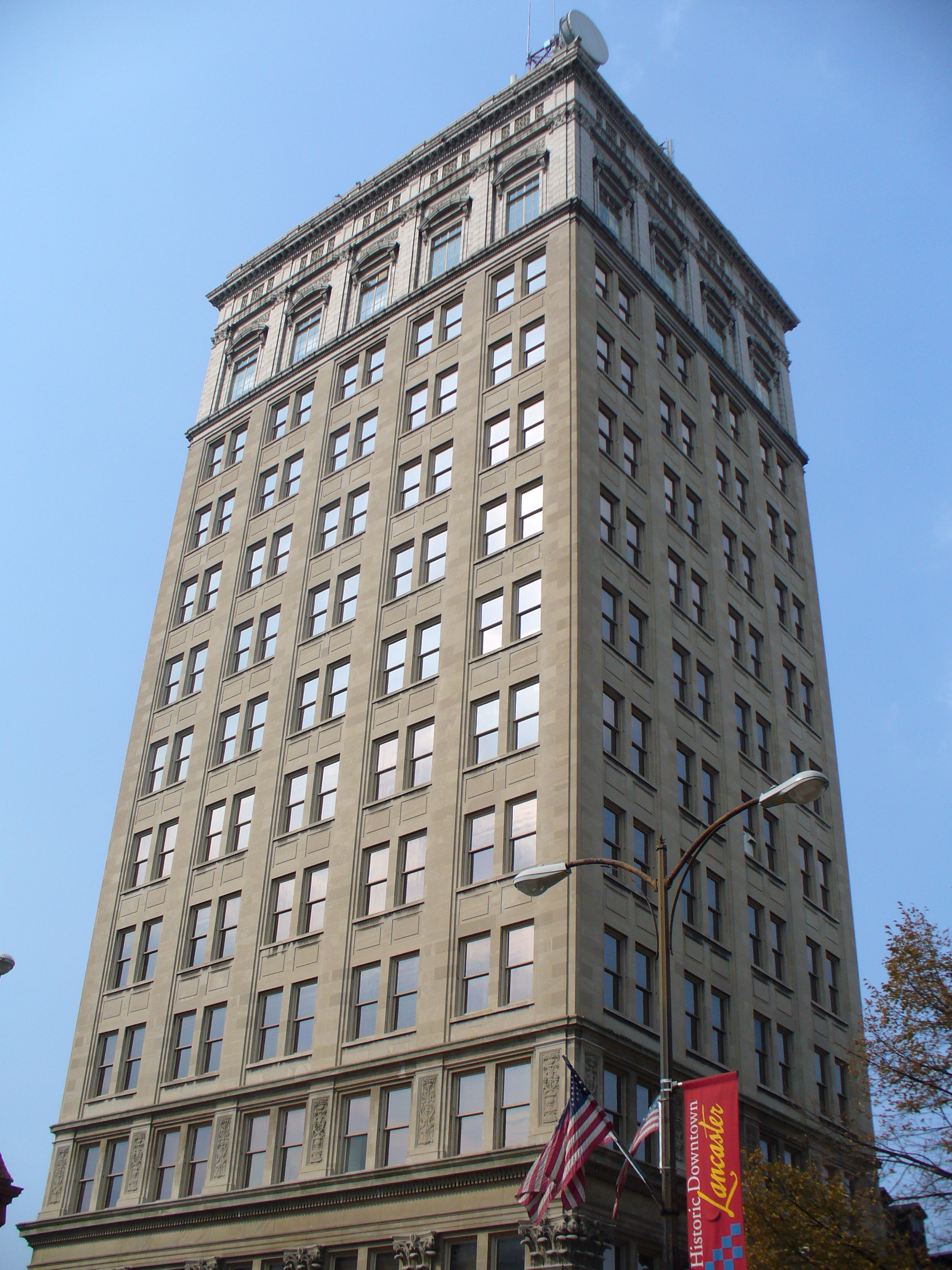
W. W. Griest Building, Lancaster

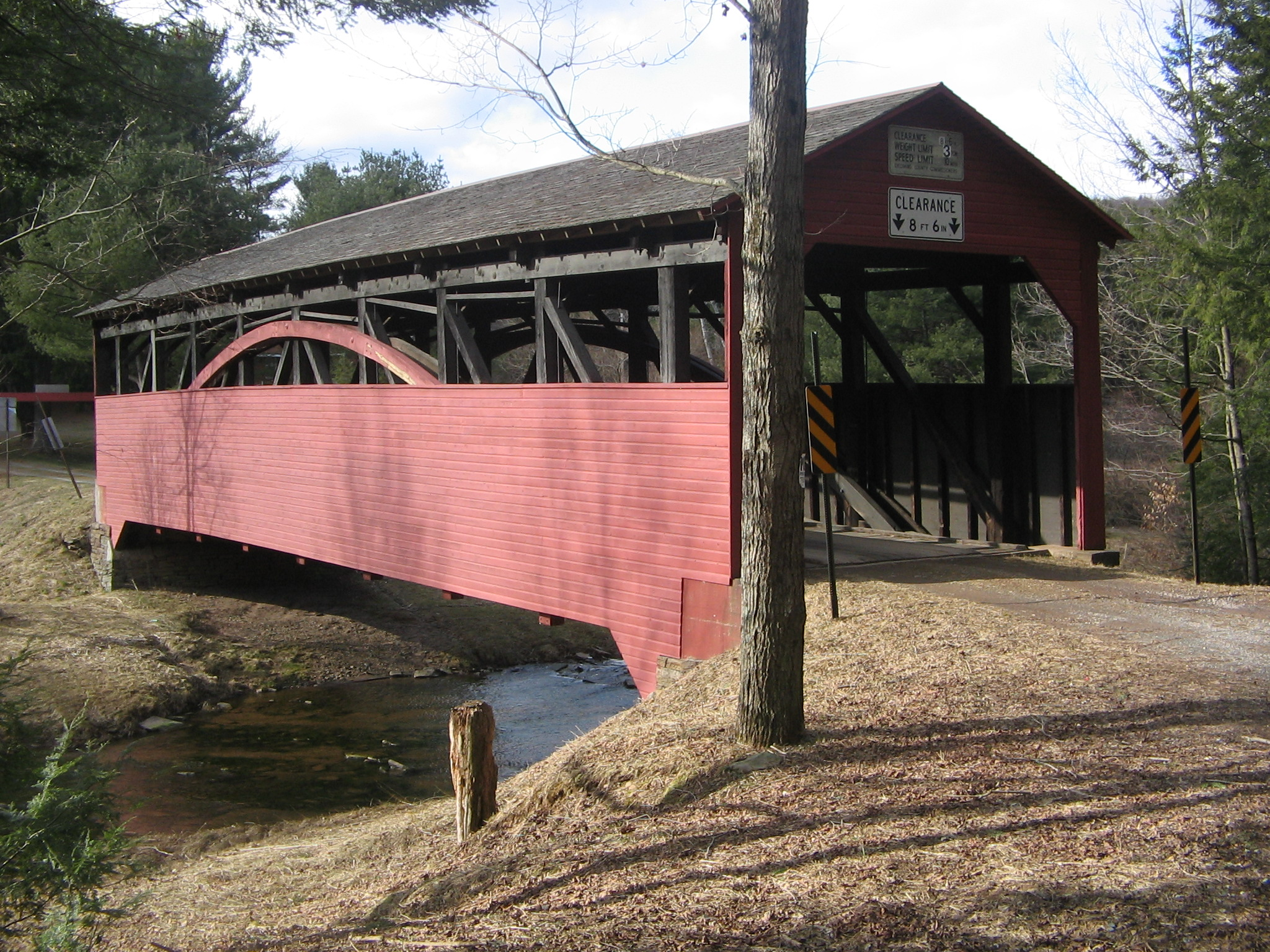
Cogan House Covered Bridge, Lycoming County

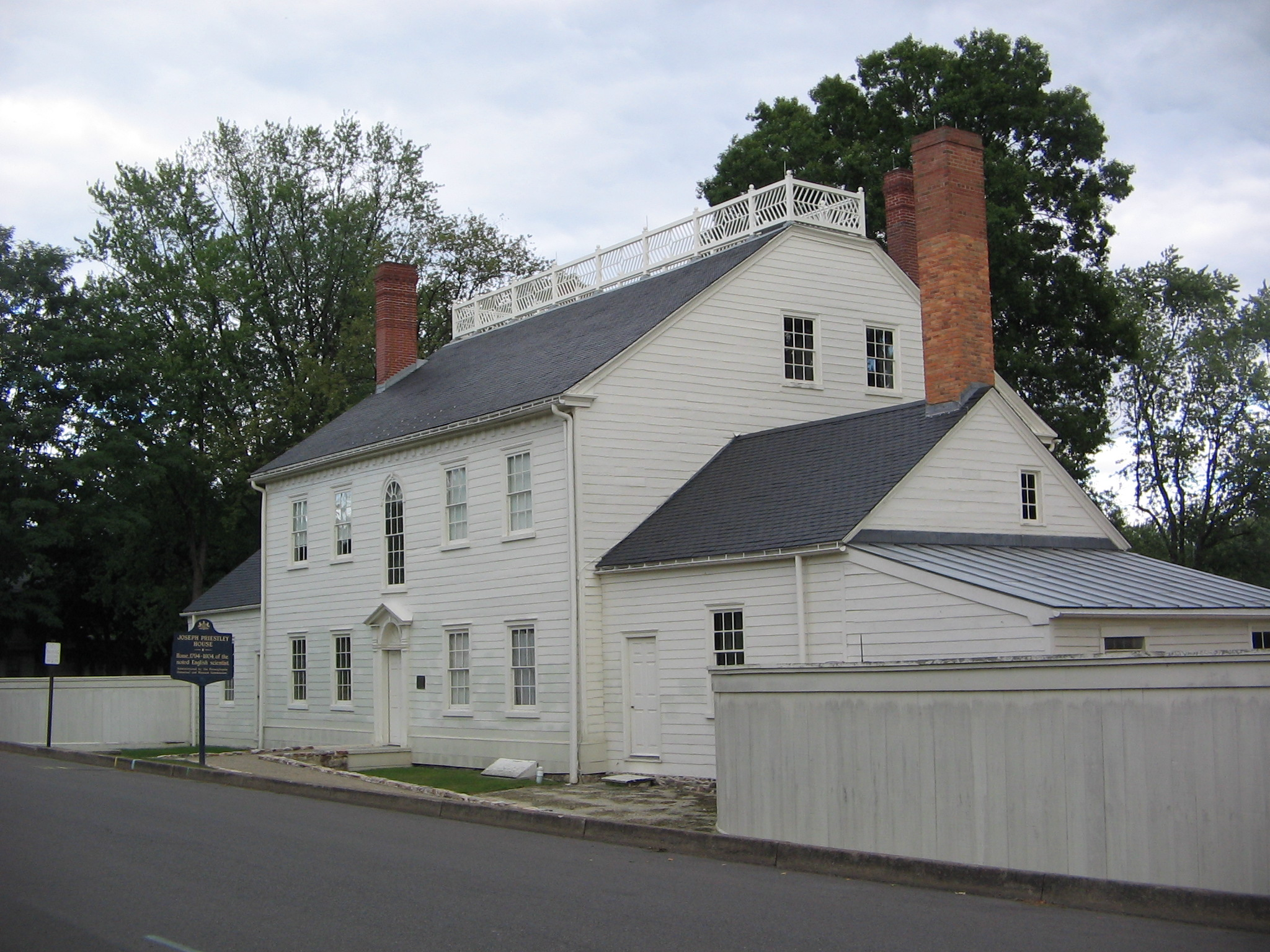
Joseph Priestley House, Northumberland County

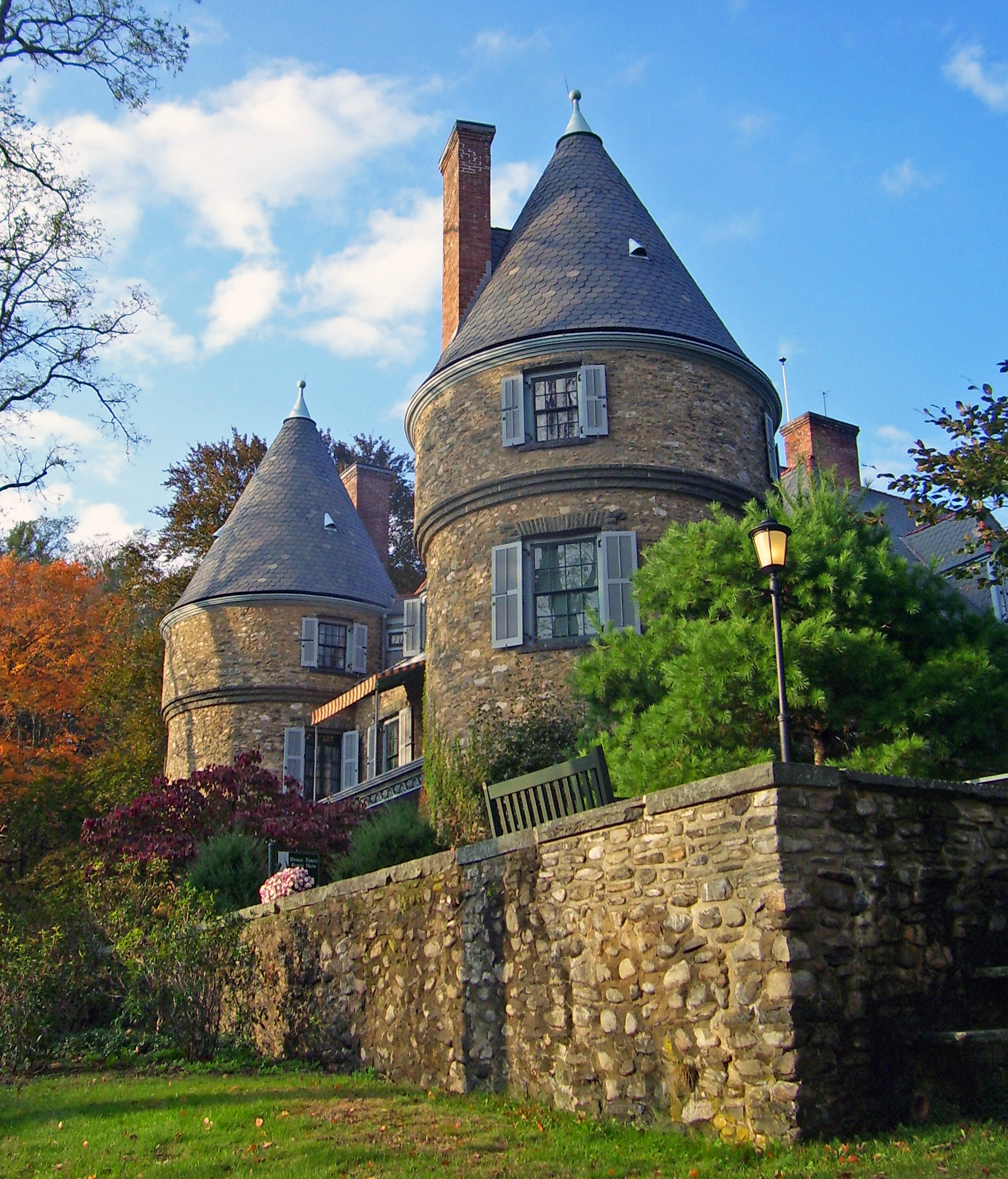
Grey Towers National Historic Site, Pike County

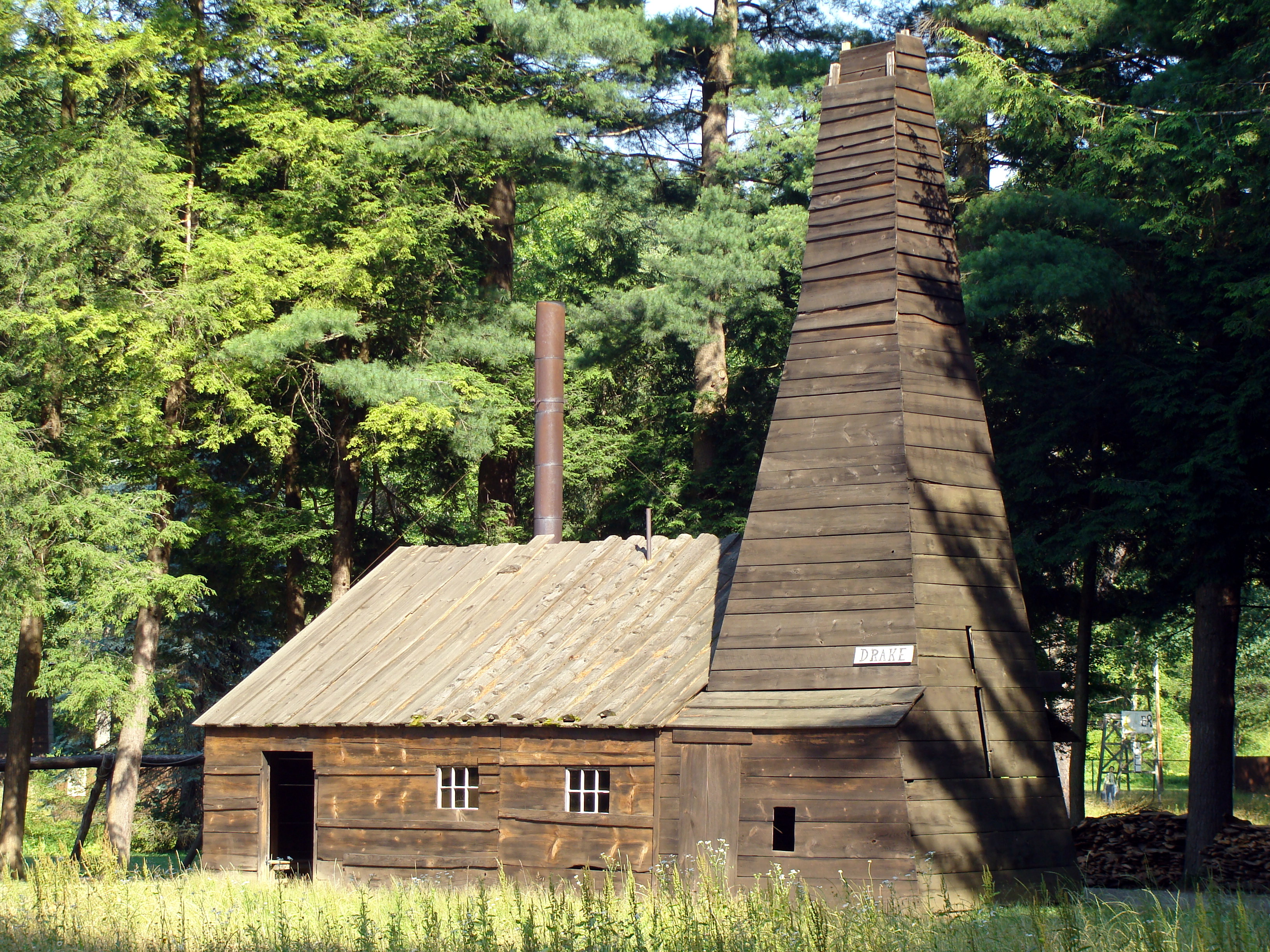
Drake Oil Well, Venango County

	County	# of Sites
1	Adams	36
	Allegheny: Pittsburgh	191
	Allegheny: Other	81
	Allegheny: Duplicates	(4) (Note: The Allegheny River Lock and Dam No. 2 is split between Pittsburgh and O'Hara Township, the Fortieth Street Bridge is split between Pittsburgh and Millvale, the Homestead High-Level Bridge is split between Pittsburgh and Homestead, and the McKees Rocks Bridge is split between Pittsburgh and McKees Rocks and Stowe Township.)
2	Allegheny: Total	268
3	Armstrong	15
4	Beaver	23
5	Bedford	32
6	Berks	144
7	Blair	30
8	Bradford	13
9	Bucks	167
10	Butler	13
11	Cambria	34
12	Cameron	1
13	Carbon	16
14	Centre	64
	Chester: Eastern	113
	Chester: Northern	90
	Chester: Southern	123
	Chester: Duplicates	(1) (Note: Middle Pickering Rural Historic District (Eastern and Northern))
15	Chester: Total	324
16	Clarion	6
17	Clearfield	20
18	Clinton	10
19	Columbia	31
20	Crawford	21
21	Cumberland	36
22	Dauphin	79
23	Delaware	104
24	Elk	12
25	Erie	54
26	Fayette	68
27	Forest	5
28	Franklin	65
29	Fulton	8
30	Greene	44
31	Huntingdon	42
32	Indiana	24
33	Jefferson	15
34	Juniata	7
35	Lackawanna	38
	Lancaster: Lancaster	57
	Lancaster: Other	153
	Lancaster: Duplicates	(1) (Note: The Lancaster City Historic District is split between Lancaster and Manheim Township)
36	Lancaster: Total	209
37	Lawrence	10
38	Lebanon	31
39	Lehigh	59
40	Luzerne	38
41	Lycoming	21
42	McKean	10
43	Mercer	16
44	Mifflin	10
45	Monroe	22
46	Montgomery	162
47	Montour	7
48	Northampton	67
49	Northumberland	30
50	Perry	23
	Philadelphia: Center City	150
	Philadelphia: North	173
	Philadelphia: Northeast	78
	Philadelphia: Northwest	80
	Philadelphia: South	65
	Philadelphia: Southwest	12
	Philadelphia: West	68
	Philadelphia: Duplicates	(5) (Note: Fairmount Park (North, Northwest, and West Philadelphia), Adams Avenue Bridge in Philadelphia (North and Northeast Philadelphia), Park Towne Place (Center City and North Philadelphia), and University Avenue Bridge (West and South Philadelphia).)
51	Philadelphia: Total	621
52	Pike	27
53	Potter	5
54	Schuylkill	20
55	Snyder	8
56	Somerset	32
57	Sullivan	7
58	Susquehanna	9
59	Tioga	10
60	Union	20
61	Venango	19
62	Warren	11
63	Washington	99
64	Wayne	18
65	Westmoreland	54
66	Wyoming	5
67	York	101
Duplicates:		(47) (Note: The following sites are listed in multiple counties: Allegheny Portage Railroad National Historic Site (Blair and Cambria), Allegheny River Lock and Dam No. 4 (Allegheny and Westmoreland), Allenwood River Bridge (Northumberland and Union), Bartram's Covered Bridge (Chester and Delaware), Birmingham Bridge (Blair and Huntingdon), Black Rock Bridge (Chester and Montgomery), Gottlieb Brown Covered Bridge (Montour and Northumberland), Brownsville Bridge (Fayette and Washington), Carbon County Section of the Lehigh Canal (Carbon and Northampton), Central Bethlehem Historic District (Lehigh and Northampton), Charleroi-Monessen Bridge (Washington and Westmoreland), Compton and Bloomfield (Montgomery and Philadelphia), Cook Forest State Park Indian Cabin District (Clarion and Forest), Dauphin County Bridge No. 27 (Dauphin and Northumberland), Horn Davis Overholtzer Bridge (Greene and Washington), Delaware Boundary Markers (Chester and Delaware), Delaware Division of the Pennsylvania Canal (Bucks and Northampton), Delaware and Hudson Canal (Pike and Wayne), East Broad Top Railroad (Bedford and Huntingdon), East Oriental Covered Bridge (Juniata and Snyder), Eliza Furnace (Cambria and Indiana), Etters Bridge (Cumberland and York), Fountain Hill Historic District (Lehigh and Northampton), Gilbert Bridge (Cumberland and York), Hopewell Furnace National Historic Site (Berks and Chester), Lawrence L. Knoebel Covered Bridge (Columbia and Northumberland), Kreigbaum Covered Bridge (Columbia and Northumberland), Lehigh Canal Allentown to Hopeville Section (Lehigh and Northampton), Marion Bridge (Fayette and Greene), Market Street Bridge (Cumberland and Dauphin), Mercer's Mill Covered Bridge (Chester and Lancaster), Millersburg Ferry (Dauphin and Perry), North Oriental Covered Bridge (Juniata and Snyder), Old Columbia-Wrightsville Bridge (Lancaster and York), Pine Grove Covered Bridge (Chester and Lancaster), Richards Covered Bridge (Columbia and Northumberland), Rockville Bridge (Dauphin and Perry), Schuylkill Navigation Canal, Oakes Reach Section (Chester and Montgomery), Twin Bridges Rural Historic District (Chester and Delaware), Stanley (Montgomery and Philadelphia), Upper Roxborough Historic District (Montgomery and Philadelphia), Valley Forge National Historical Park (Chester and Montgomery), Watsontown River Bridge (Northumberland and Union), Webster Donora Bridge (Washington and Westmoreland), Windber Historic District (Cambria and Somerset), and Woodvale Historic District (Bedford, Fulton, and Huntingdon).)
Total:		3,602

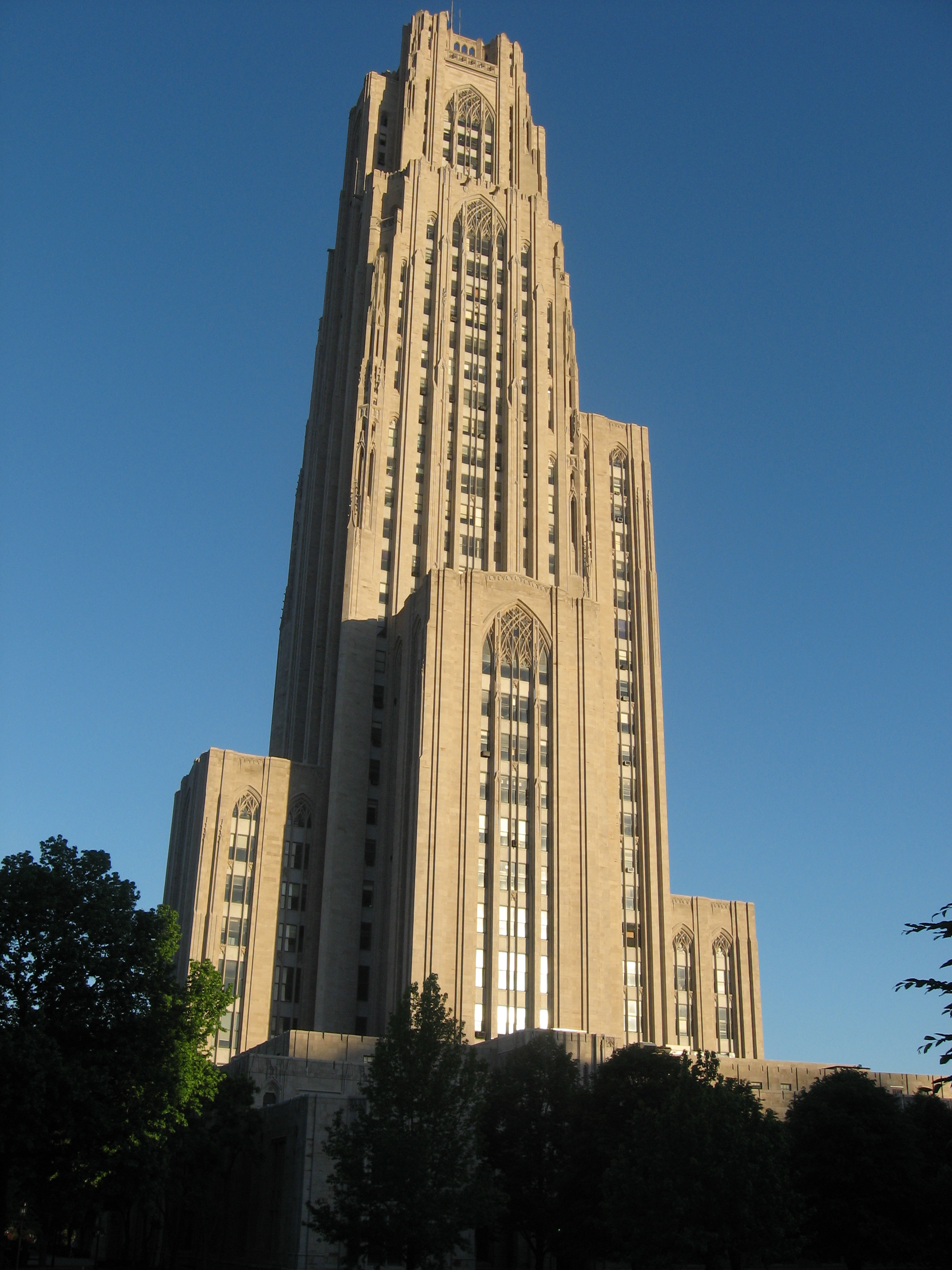
Cathedral of Learning, Pittsburgh

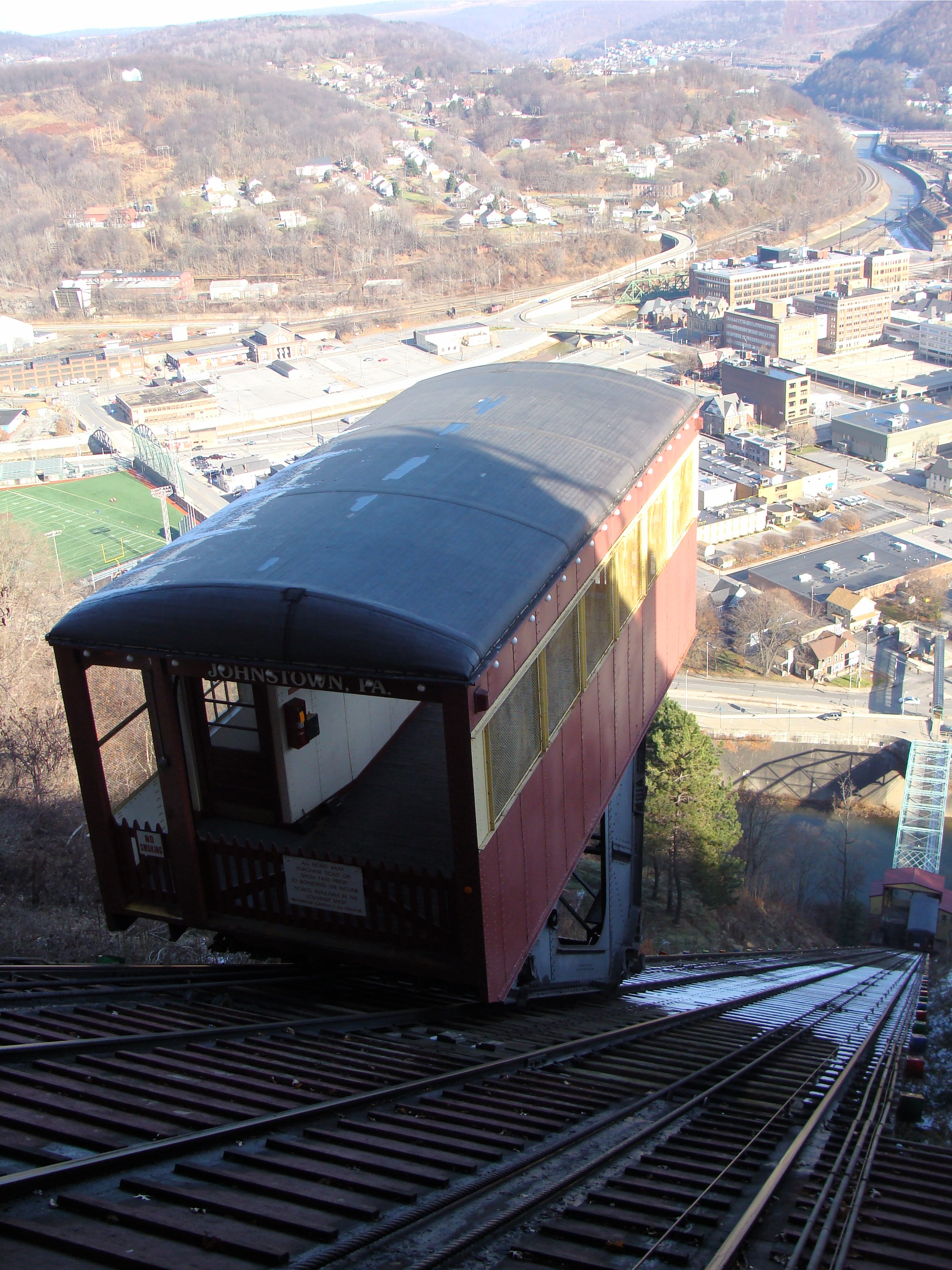
Johnstown Inclined Plane, Cambria County

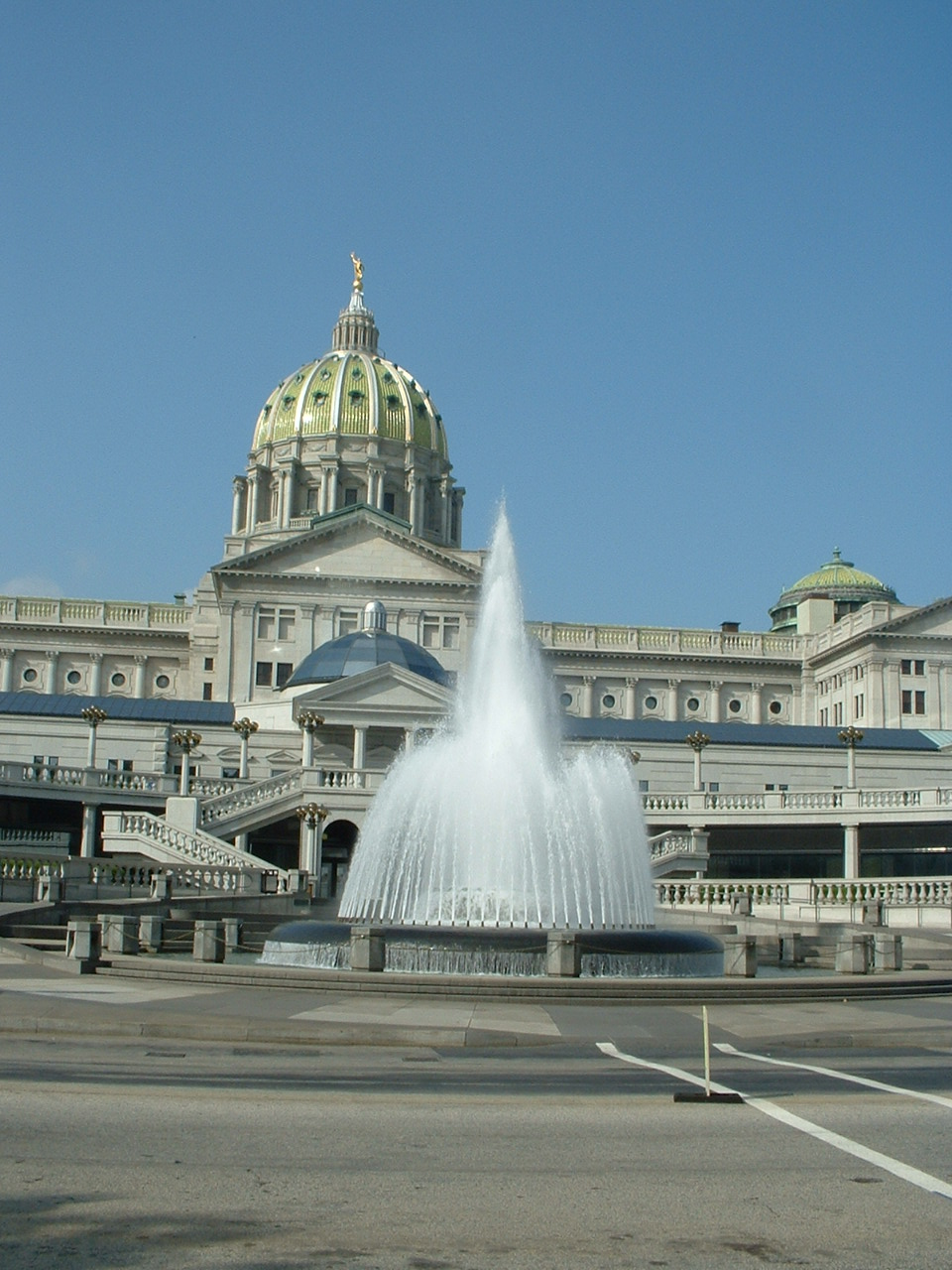
Pennsylvania State Capitol Building, Dauphin County

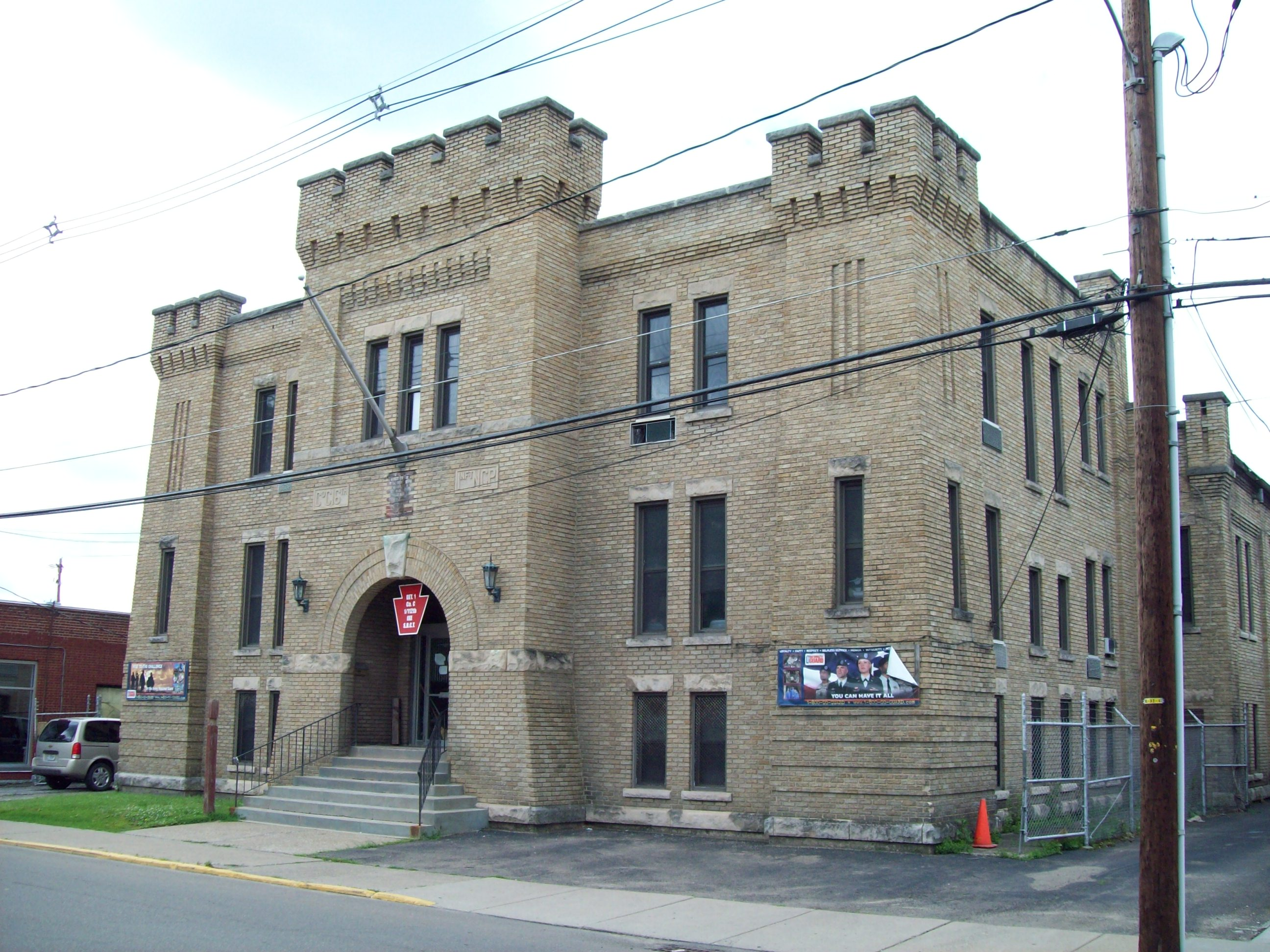
Bradford Armory, McKean County

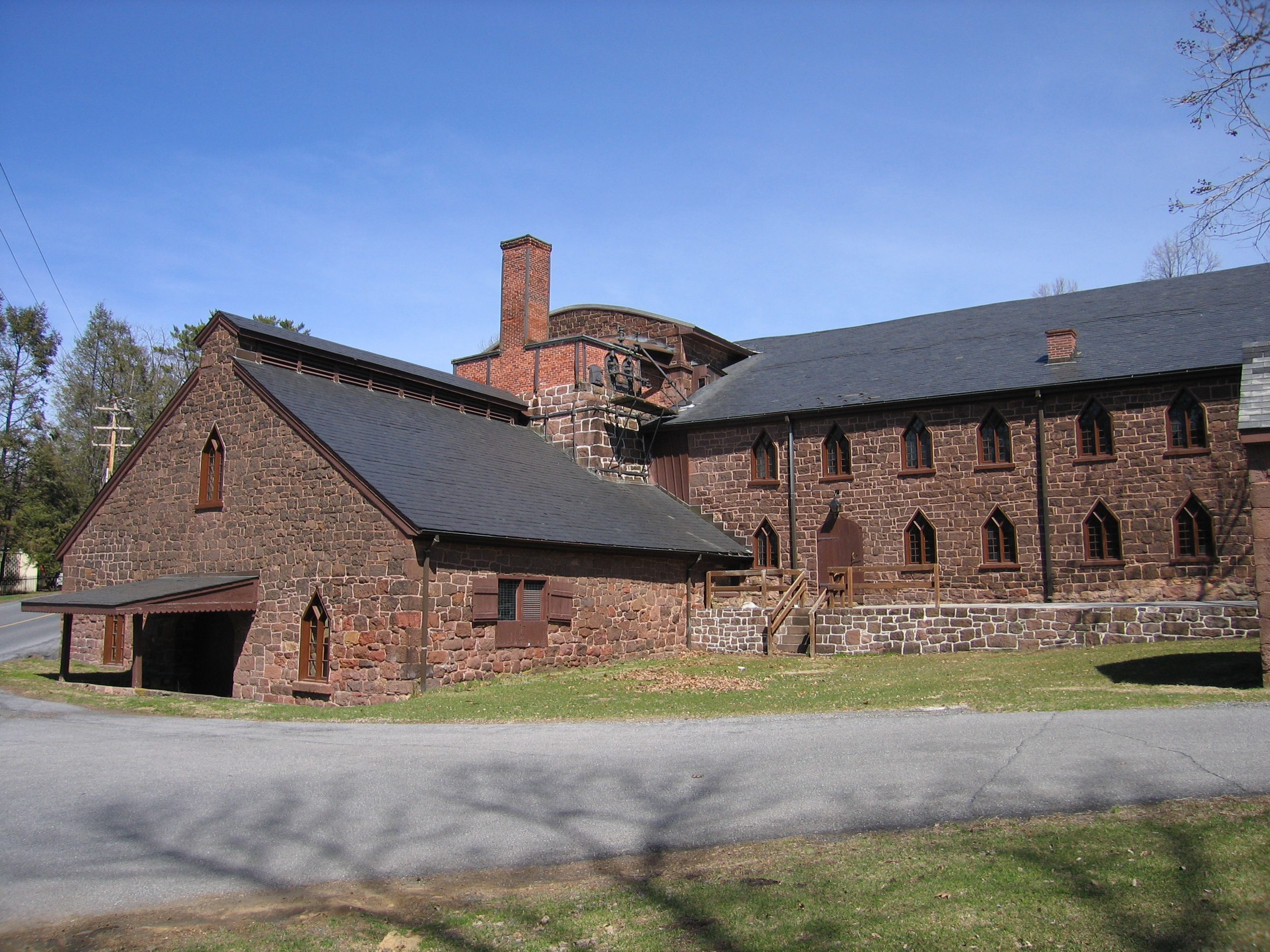
Cornwall Iron Furnace, Lebanon County

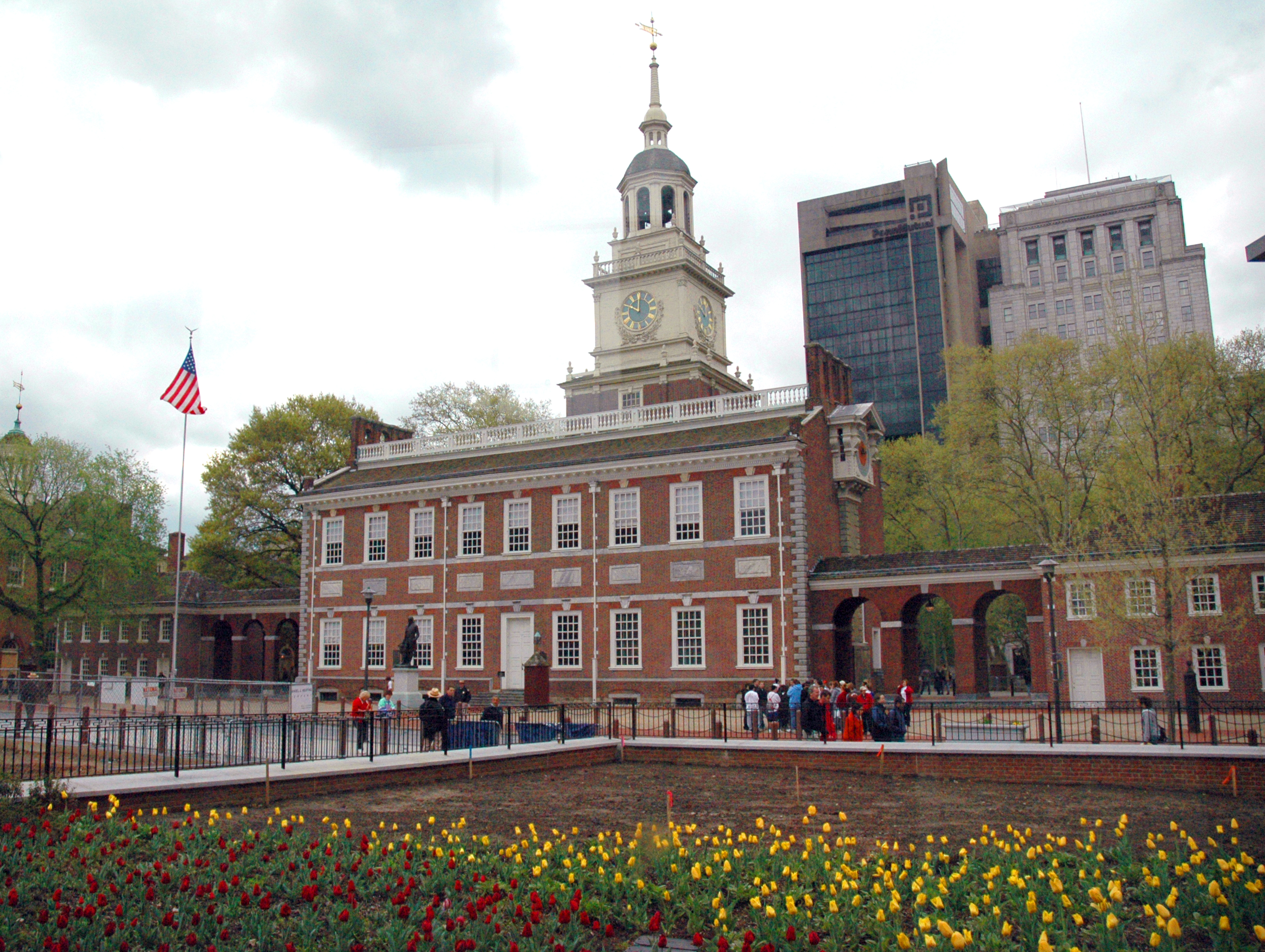
Independence National Historical Park, Philadelphia

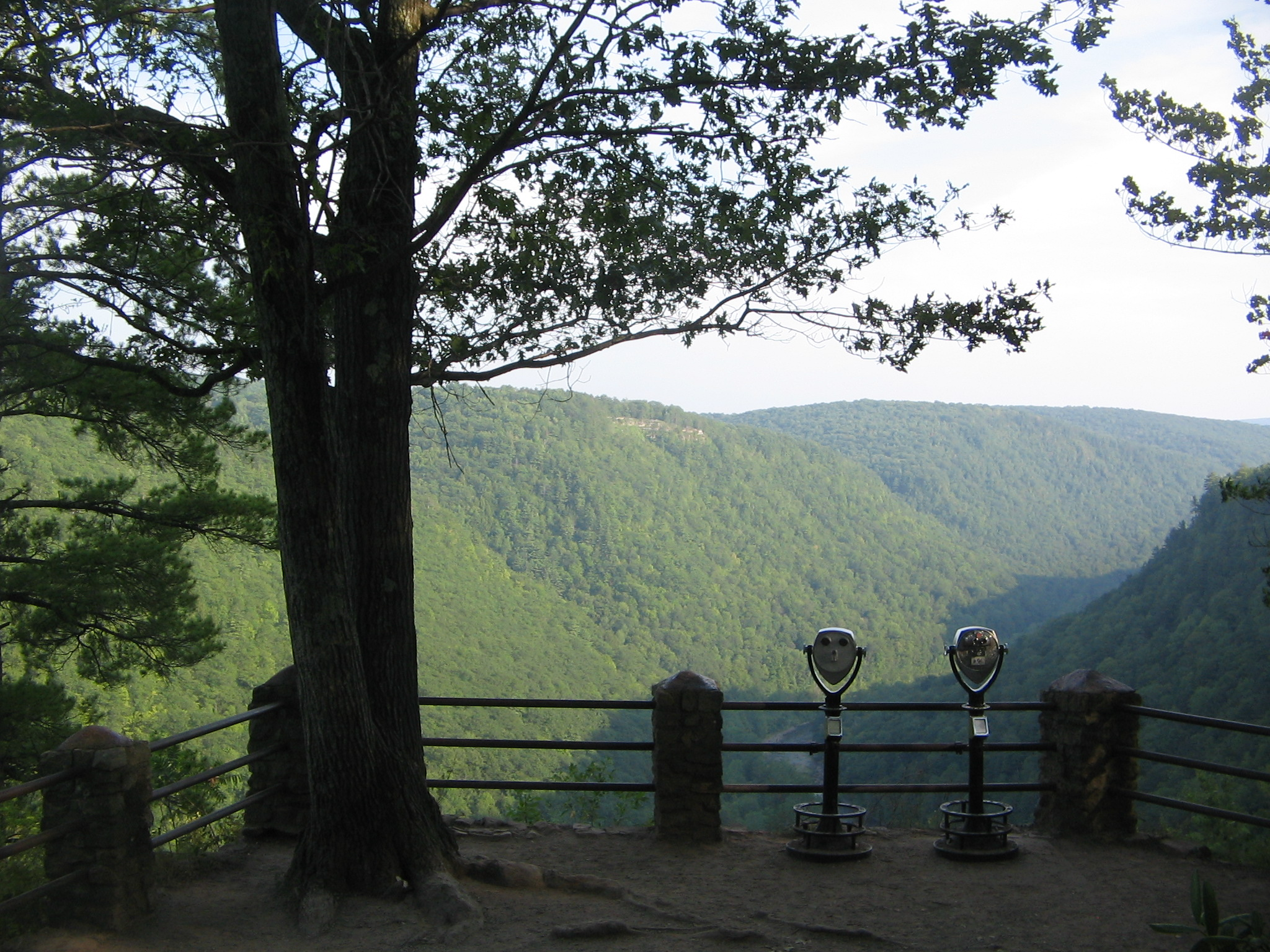
Colton Point State Park, Tioga County

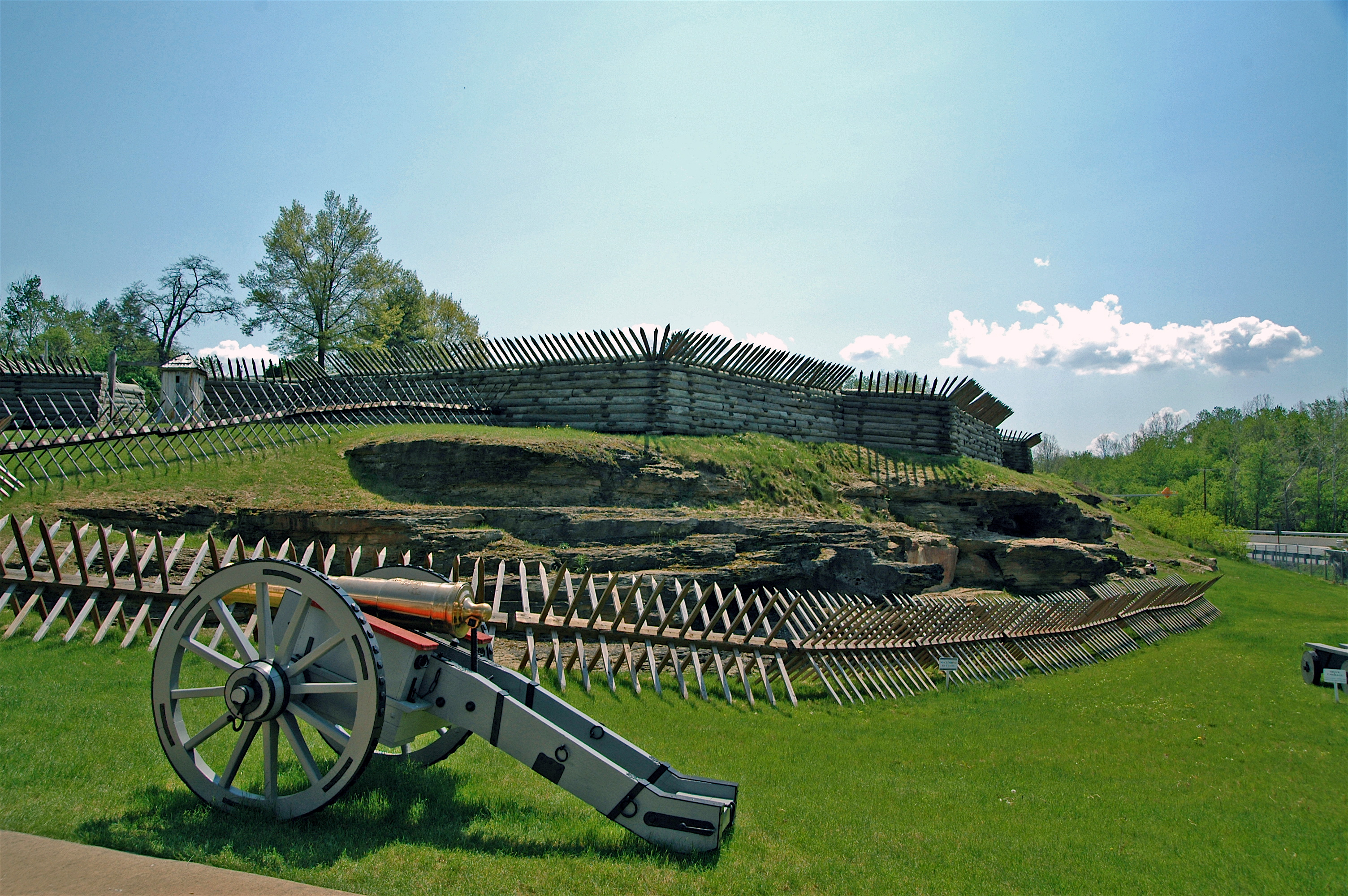
Fort Ligonier Site, Westmoreland County

== See also ==
- List of European archaeological sites on the National Register of Historic Places in Pennsylvania
- List of Native American archaeological sites on the National Register of Historic Places in Pennsylvania
- List of bridges on the National Register of Historic Places in Pennsylvania (excluding covered bridges)
  - List of covered bridges on the National Register of Historic Places in Pennsylvania
- List of National Historic Landmarks in Pennsylvania (excluding Philadelphia)
  - List of National Historic Landmarks in Philadelphia
- List of Pennsylvania state historical markers
- List of historical societies in Pennsylvania
