= List of Pennsylvania state historical markers in Columbia County =

Location of Columbia County in Pennsylvania

This is a list of the Pennsylvania state historical markers in Columbia County.

This is intended to be a complete list of the official state historical markers placed in Columbia County, Pennsylvania by the Pennsylvania Historical and Museum Commission (PHMC). The locations of the historical markers, as well as the latitude and longitude coordinates as provided by the PHMC's database, are included below when available. There are eight historical markers located in Columbia County.

== Historical markers ==
Marker title	Image	Date dedicated	Location	Marker type	Topics
Catawissa Friends Meeting		May 8, 1948	Junction U.S. 11 & Pa. 42, .7 mile SW of Bloomsburg	Roadside	Buildings, Early Settlement, Religion
Catawissa Friends Meeting		May 1, 1948	South St. between 3rd & 4th Sts., Catawissa; 40.95087°N 76.46143°W	Roadside	Buildings, Early Settlement, Religion
Columbia County		July 11, 1983	County Courthouse, Main St., Bloomsburg; 41.00305°N 76.45707°W	City	Bridges, Cities & Towns, Government & Politics, Government & Politics 19th Century, Religion
Fishing Creek confederacy		July 26, 2009	90 Mill St. (PA 487), Benton, PA; 41.1918°N 76.3836°W	Roadside	Abraham Lincoln, Civil War, Forts, Government & Politics 19th Century, Military
Fort Jenkins		May 8, 1948	Old U.S. 11, 6.5 miles NE of Bloomsburg	Roadside	American Revolution, Forts, Government & Politics 18th Century, Military, Native American
Fort McClure		May 8, 1948	U.S. 11 at Fairgrounds, Bloomsburg	Roadside	American Revolution, Early Settlement, Forts, Military, Native American
Fort Wheeler		May 10, 1948	Pa. 487, 1.2 miles NE of Bloomsburg; 41.02542°N 76.42947°W	Roadside	American Revolution, Forts, Military, Native American
Wyoming Path		May 3, 1949	W 2nd St. (US 11) near W Ft. McClure Blvd., at Fairgrounds, Bloomsburg; 40.99448°N 76.4731°W	Roadside	Native American, Paths & Trails, Religion, Transportation

== See also ==
- List of Pennsylvania state historical markers
- National Register of Historic Places listings in Columbia County, Pennsylvania
