= National Register of Historic Places listings in Cameron County, Pennsylvania =

Location of Cameron County in Pennsylvania

This is a list of the National Register of Historic Places listings in Cameron County, Pennsylvania.

This is intended to be a complete list of the properties and districts on the National Register of Historic Places in Cameron County, Pennsylvania, United States. The locations of National Register properties and districts for which the latitude and longitude coordinates are included below, may be seen in a map.

There is 1 property listed on the National Register in the county.

This National Park Service list is complete through NPS recent listings posted March 14, 2025.

== Current listings ==
	Name on the Register	Image	Date listed	Location	Municipality	Description
1	Cameron County Courthouse	Cameron County Courthouse	October 20, 2022 (#100007460)	20 East 5th St. 41°30′45″N 78°14′12″W	Emporium	

== See also ==
- List of Pennsylvania state historical markers in Cameron County
