= Furnace Covered Bridge No. 11 =

- U.S. National Register of Historic Places
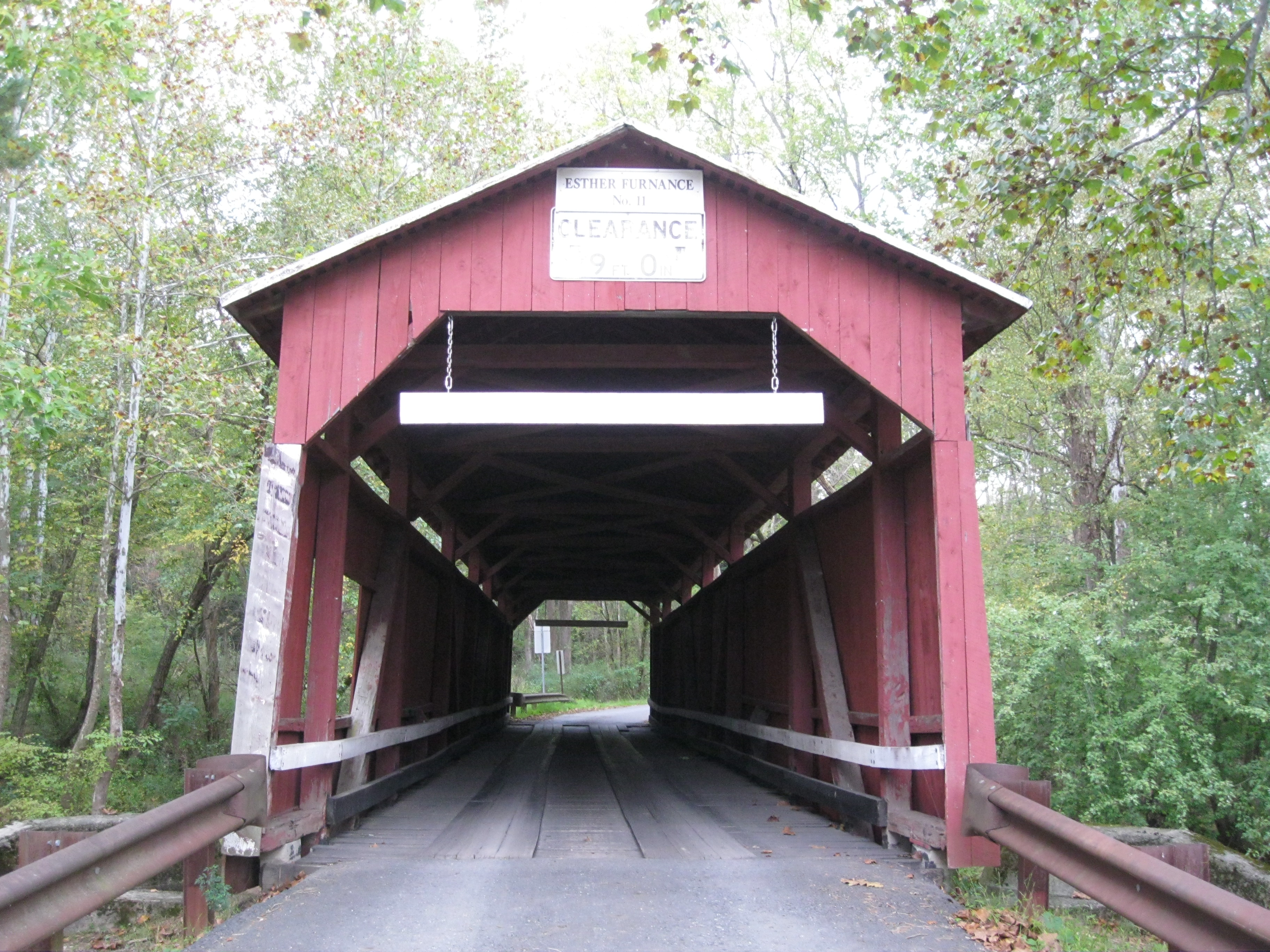
- The bridge in September 2012

- Location within Pennsylvania Location within the United States
- Location: Pennsylvania Route 373, Cleveland Township, Pennsylvania
- Coordinates: 40°54′24″N 76°27′37″W
- Area: 0.1 acres (0.040 ha)
- Built: 1882
- Built by: C.W. Eves
- Architectural style: Queen Post Truss
- MPS: Covered Bridges of Columbia and Montour Counties TR
- NRHP reference No.: 79003190
- Added to NRHP: November 29, 1979

The Furnace Covered Bridge No. 11 is a historic wooden covered bridge located at Cleveland Township in Columbia County, Pennsylvania. It is a 100.9-foot-long (30.8 m), Queen Post Truss bridge with a tarred metal roof, constructed in 1882. It crosses the North Branch of Roaring Creek. It is one of 28 historic covered bridges in Columbia and Montour Counties.

It was listed on the National Register of Historic Places in 1979.
