= Watsontown River Bridge =

- U.S. National Register of Historic Places
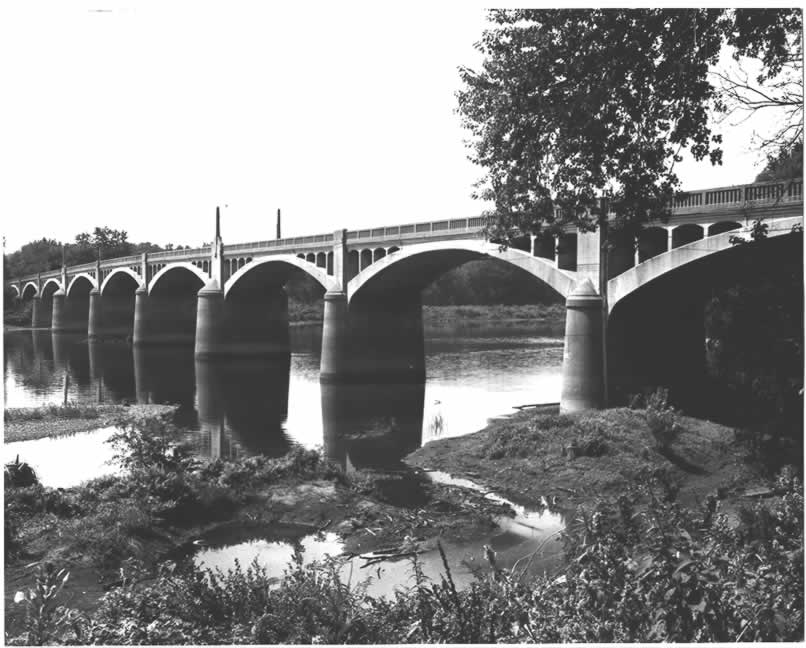
- Watsontown River Bridge, 1982

- Location within Pennsylvania Location within the United States
- Location: Legislative Route 240 spur over the West Branch of the Susquehanna River, Watsontown and White Deer Township, Pennsylvania
- Coordinates: 41°4′51″N 76°51′55″W
- Area: 1 acre (0.40 ha)
- Built: 1927
- Built by: George W. Rockwell
- Architect: James B. Long
- Architectural style: Open-spandrel arch
- MPS: Highway Bridges Owned by the Commonwealth of Pennsylvania, Department of Transportation TR
- NRHP reference No.: 88000801
- Added to NRHP: June 22, 1988

Watsontown River Bridge is a historic bridge in Watsontown, Northumberland County, Pennsylvania and White Deer Township, Union County, Pennsylvania. It was built in 1927, and consists of nine open spandrel arches with a total length of 1,080-foot-long (330 m). It is constructed of concrete and crosses the Susquehanna River.

It was listed on the National Register of Historic Places in 1988.
