= Cleveland Township, Columbia County, Pennsylvania =

Township in Pennsylvania, US

Coordinates: 40°53′00″N 76°26′59″W

Cleveland Township, Pennsylvania
- Township
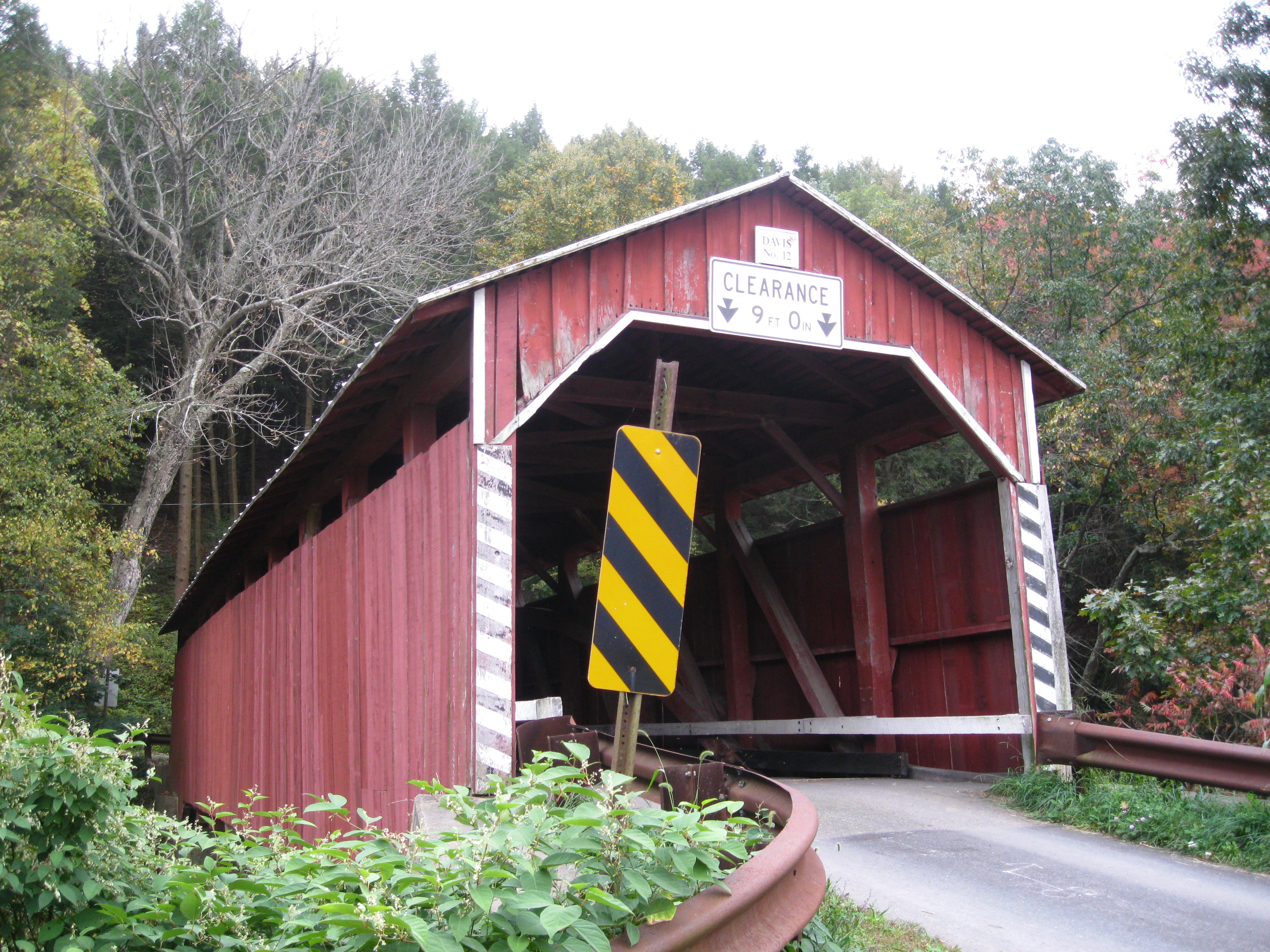
- Davis Covered Bridge over the North Branch of Roaring Creek in the township

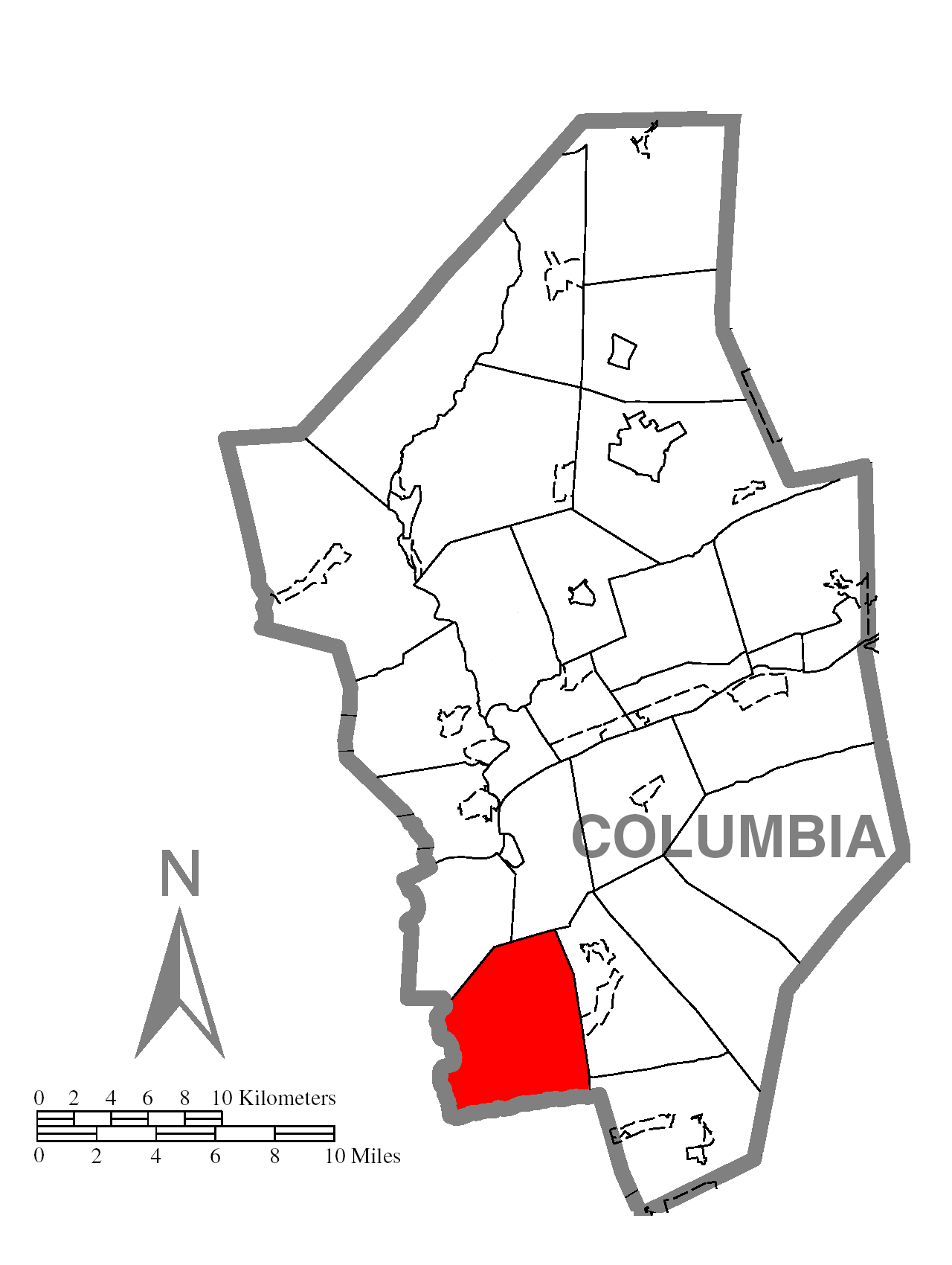
- Map of Columbia County, Pennsylvania highlighting Cleveland Township

- Map of Columbia County, Pennsylvania
- Country: United States
- State: Pennsylvania
- County: Columbia
- Settled: 1772
- Incorporated: 1893

Area
  - Total: 23.36 sq mi (60.49 km^{2})
  - Land: 23.19 sq mi (60.07 km^{2})
  - Water: 0.16 sq mi (0.42 km^{2})

Population (2020)
  - Total: 1,131 ▲
  - Estimate (2021): 1,083
  - Density: 46.7/sq mi (18.03/km^{2})
- Time zone: UTC-5 (Eastern (EST))
  - Summer (DST): UTC-4 (EDT)
- Area code: 570
- FIPS code: 42-037-14184
- Website: www.clevelandtownship.net

Cleveland Township is a township in Columbia County, Pennsylvania. It is part of Northeastern Pennsylvania. The population was 1,131 at the 2020 census.

Knoebels Amusement Resort lies just within the township boundary.

== History ==
The Furnace Covered Bridge No. 11, Johnson Covered Bridge No. 28, Lawrence L. Knoebel Covered Bridge, Davis Covered Bridge, Kreigbaum Covered Bridge, Richards Covered Bridge, and Parr's Mill Covered Bridge No. 10 were listed on the National Register of Historic Places in 1979.

== Geography ==
Cleveland Township is in southwestern Columbia County, bordered by Northumberland County to the west and south. The South Branch Roaring Creek forms the county boundary here. According to the United States Census Bureau, the township has a total area of 23.4 square miles (60.5 km^{2}), of which 23.2 square miles (60.1 km^{2}) is land and 0.2 square miles (0.4 km^{2}), or 0.71%, is water.

== Demographics ==
Historical population
Census	Pop.	Note	%±
2010	1,110		—
2020	1,131		1.9%
2021 (est.)	1,136		0.4%
U.S. Decennial Census

As of the census of 2000, there were 1,004 people, 390 households, and 308 families residing in the township. The population density was 43.0 inhabitants per square mile (16.6/km^{2}). There were 477 housing units at an average density of 20.4 units per square mile (7.9 units/km^{2}). The racial makeup of the township was 99.80% White, 0.10% African American, and 0.10% from two or more races. Hispanic or Latino of any race were 0.30% of the population.

There were 390 households, out of which 27.7% had children under the age of 18 living with them, 66.7% were married couples living together, 5.1% had a female householder with no husband present, and 21.0% were non-families. 15.9% of all households were made up of individuals, and 6.7% had someone living alone who was 65 years of age or older. The average household size was 2.57 and the average family size was 2.88.

In the township the population was spread out, with 19.7% under the age of 18, 6.8% from 18 to 24, 28.0% from 25 to 44, 29.3% from 45 to 64, and 16.2% who were 65 years of age or older. The median age was 43 years. For every 100 females, there were 103.7 males. For every 100 females age 18 and over, there were 104.6 males.

The median income for a household in the township was $38,490, and the median income for a family was $42,824. Males had a median income of $30,985 versus $22,708 for females. The per capita income for the township was $16,982. About 7.6% of families and 7.8% of the population were below the poverty line, including 8.7% of those under age 18 and 11.8% of those age 65 or over.
