= Ralpho Township, Pennsylvania =

Township in Pennsylvania, US

Coordinates: 40°53′00″N 76°32′59″W

- Township
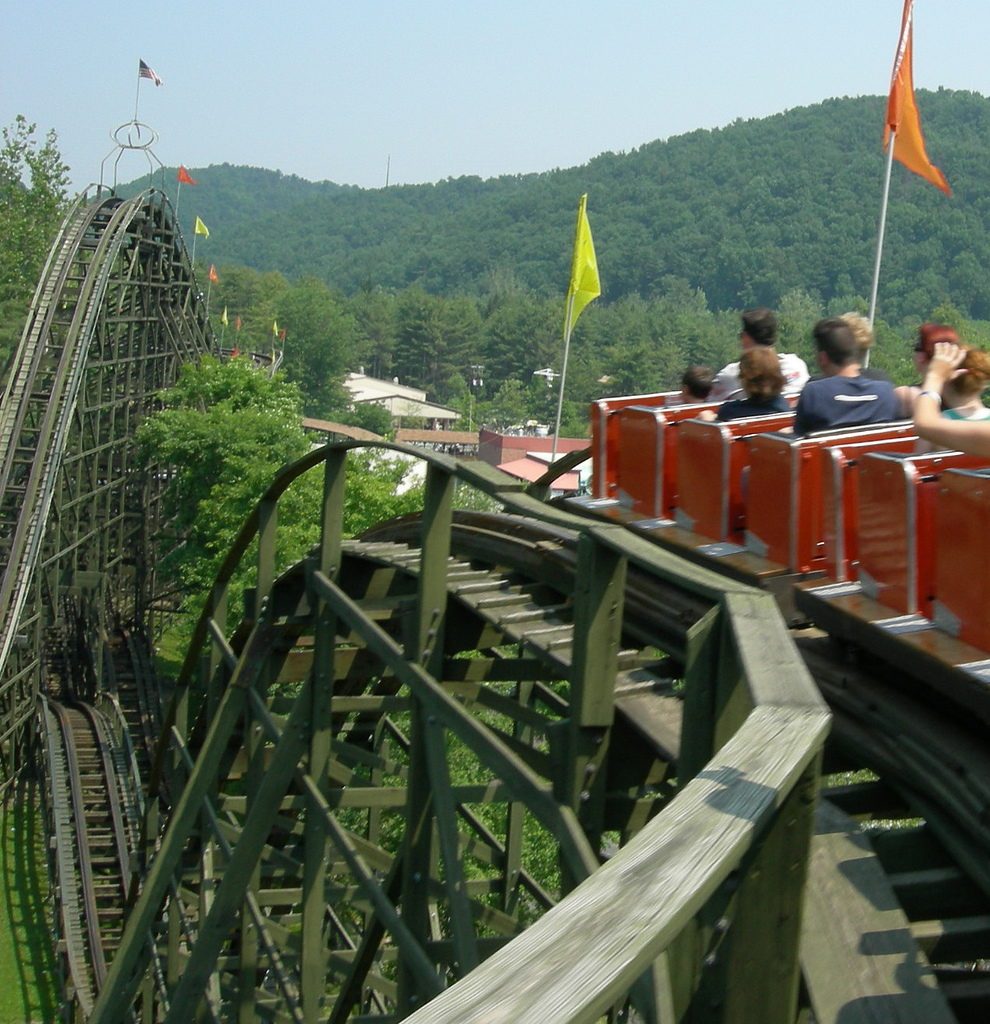
- The Phoenix in Knoebels Amusement Resort is in Ralpho Township

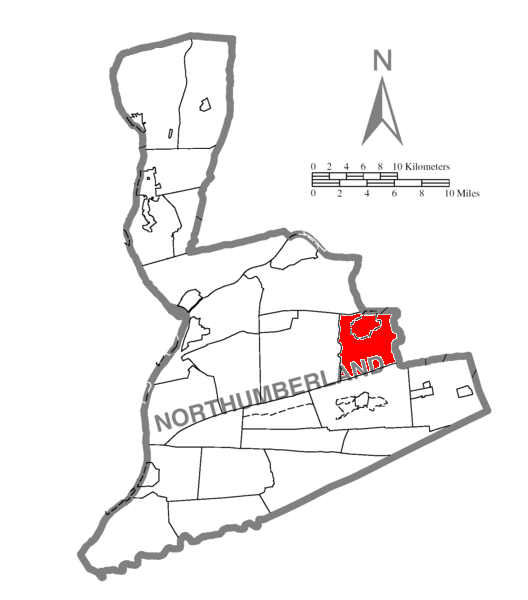
- Map of Northumberland County, Pennsylvania highlighting Ralpho Township

- Map of Northumberland County, Pennsylvania
- Country: United States
- State: Pennsylvania
- County: Northumberland
- Settled: 1779
- Incorporated: 1883

Government
  - Type: Board of Supervisors

Area
  - Total: 18.50 sq mi (47.92 km^{2})
  - Land: 18.46 sq mi (47.82 km^{2})
  - Water: 0.039 sq mi (0.10 km^{2})

Population (2010)
  - Total: 4,321
  - Estimate (2016): 4,284
  - Density: 232.0/sq mi (89.58/km^{2})
- Time zone: UTC-5 (Eastern (EST))
  - Summer (DST): UTC-4 (EDT)
- Area code: 570
- FIPS code: 42-097-63328
- Website: https://www.ralphotownship.org/

Ralpho Township is a township in Northumberland County, Pennsylvania, United States. The population at the 2010 census was 4,321, an increase over the figure of 3,764 tabulated in 2000.

== History ==
The Lawrence L. Knoebel Covered Bridge, Kreigbaum Covered Bridge, and Richards Covered Bridge are listed on the National Register of Historic Places.

== Geography ==
According to the U.S. Census Bureau, the township has a total area of 18.5 square miles (47.8 km^{2}), all land. It contains the census-designated place of Elysburg.

== Demographics ==
Historical population
Census	Pop.	Note	%±
2010	4,321		—
2016 (est.)	4,284		−0.9%
U.S. Decennial Census

As of the census of 2000, there were 3,764 people, 1,497 households, and 1,121 families residing in the township. The population density was 203.9 inhabitants per square mile (78.7/km^{2}). There were 1,600 housing units at an average density of 86.7 per square mile (33.5/km^{2}). The racial makeup of the township was 99.31% White, 0.08% African American, 0.08% Native American, 0.27% Asian, and 0.27% from two or more races. Hispanic or Latino of any race were 0.43% of the population.

There were 1,497 households, out of which 31.9% had children under the age of 18 living with them, 65.7% were married couples living together, 6.9% had a female householder with no husband present, and 25.1% were non-families. 22.9% of all households were made up of individuals, and 12.4% had someone living alone who was 65 years of age or older. The average household size was 2.47 and the average family size was 2.90.

In the township the population was spread out, with 23.0% under the age of 18, 4.9% from 18 to 24, 25.3% from 25 to 44, 27.5% from 45 to 64, and 19.3% who were 65 years of age or older. The median age was 43 years. For every 100 females, there were 95.1 males. For every 100 females age 18 and over, there were 90.7 males.

The median income for a household in the township was $44,318, and the median income for a family was $52,853. Males had a median income of $40,765 versus $24,179 for females. The per capita income for the township was $20,449. About 3.0% of families and 6.4% of the population were below the poverty line, including 7.9% of those under age 18 and 9.4% of those age 65 or over.

== Education ==
It is in the Southern Columbia Area School District.

== Recreation ==
Knoebels Amusement Resort is located in the township.
