= Hollingshead Covered Bridge No. 40 =

- U.S. National Register of Historic Places
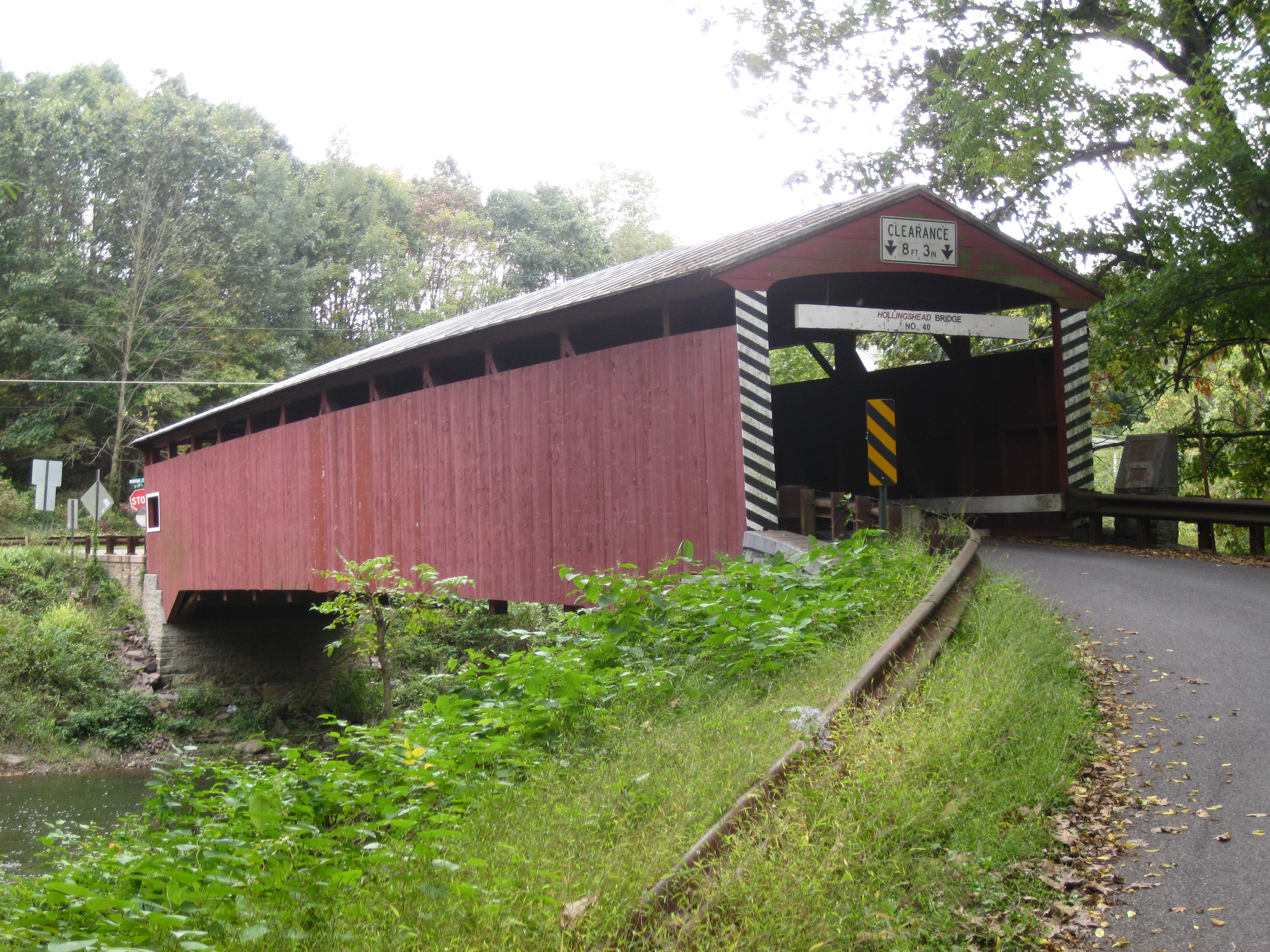
- The bridge in September 2012

- Location within Pennsylvania Location within the United States
- Location: Pennsylvania Route 405, east of Catawissa, Catawissa Township, Pennsylvania
- Coordinates: 40°57′6″N 76°26′52″W
- Area: 0.1 acres (0.040 ha)
- Built: 1850
- Built by: Peter Ent
- Architectural style: Burr Truss Arch
- MPS: Covered Bridges of Columbia and Montour Counties TR
- NRHP reference No.: 79003187
- Added to NRHP: November 29, 1979

The Hollingshead Covered Bridge No. 40 is an historic wooden covered bridge which is located in Catawissa Township in Columbia County, Pennsylvania.

It was listed on the National Register of Historic Places in 1979.

== History and architectural features ==
The Hollingshead Covered Bridge No. 40 is a 116.9-foot-long (35.6 m), Burr Truss bridge with a tarred metal roof, constructed in 1850. It crosses the Catawissa Creek. It is one of twenty-eight historic covered bridges in Columbia and Montour Counties.
