= Kreigbaum Covered Bridge =

- U.S. National Register of Historic Places
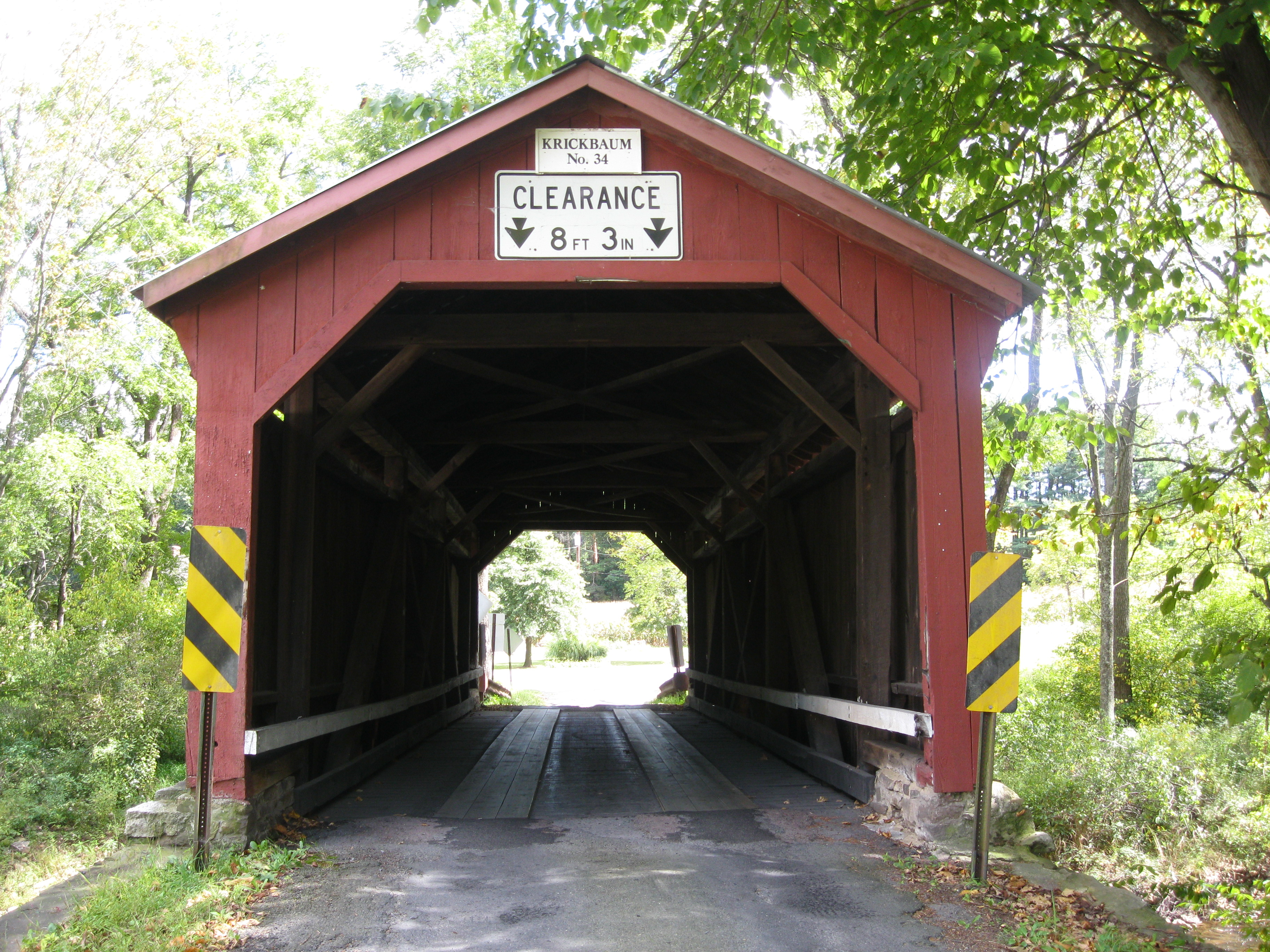
- Kreigbaum Covered Bridge in September 2012

- Location within Pennsylvania Location within the United States
- Location: East of Elysburg on Township 459, Cleveland Township and Ralpho Township, Pennsylvania
- Coordinates: 40°50′51″N 76°30′29″W
- Area: 0.1 acres (0.040 ha)
- Built: 1876
- Built by: George W. Keefer
- Architectural style: Queenpost truss
- MPS: Covered Bridges of Northumberland County TR
- NRHP reference No.: 79002316
- Added to NRHP: August 8, 1979

The Kreigbaum Covered Bridge is an historic, wooden covered bridge in Cleveland Township in Columbia County, Pennsylvania and Ralpho Township in Northumberland County, Pennsylvania, United States.

It was listed on the National Register of Historic Places in 1979.

== History and architectural features ==
Built in 1875, this historic structure is a 62.1-foot-long (18.9 m), Queen Post Truss bridge that crosses South Branch Roaring Creek. It is one of twenty-eight historic covered bridges that still exist in Columbia and Montour Counties.
