= Richards Covered Bridge =

- U.S. National Register of Historic Places
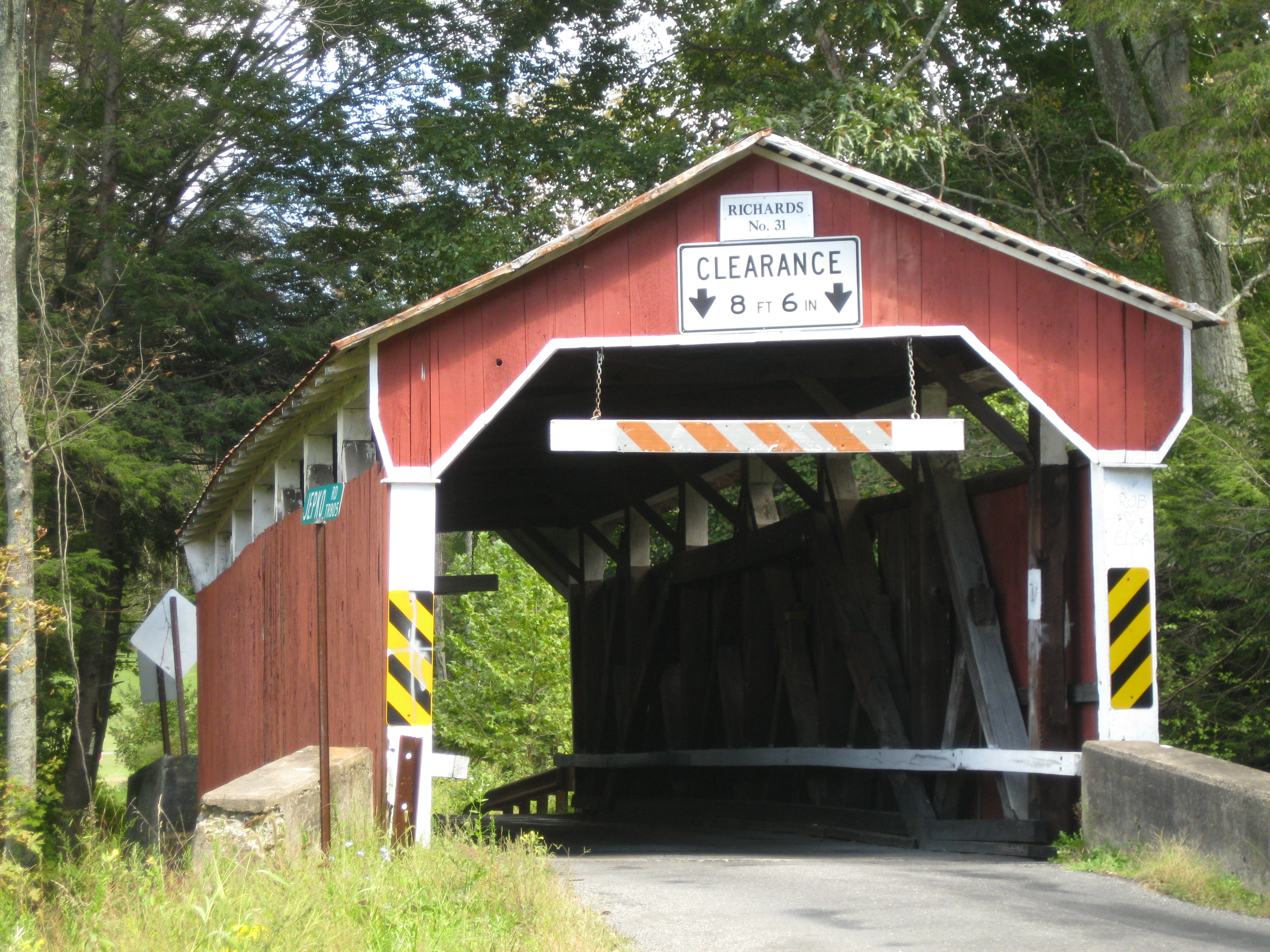
- Richards Covered Bridge, September 2012

- Location within Pennsylvania Location within the United States
- Location: East of Elysburg on Township 804, Cleveland Township and Ralpho Township, Pennsylvania
- Coordinates: 40.86746°N 76.50807°W
- Area: 0.1 acres (0.040 ha)
- Built: 1852
- Built by: Obediah S. Campbell
- Architect: William Howe
- Architectural style: Multiple Kingpost, Queenpost
- MPS: Covered Bridges of Northumberland County TR
- NRHP reference No.: 79002308
- Added to NRHP: August 8, 1979

The Richards Covered Bridge is a historic wooden covered bridge located at Cleveland Township in Columbia County, Pennsylvania and Ralpho Township in Northumberland County, Pennsylvania. It is a 64-foot-long (20 m), multiple King post and Queen Post Truss bridge, constructed in 1852. It crosses South Branch Roaring Creek and is one of 28 historic covered bridges in Columbia and Montour Counties.

It was listed on the National Register of Historic Places in 1979.
