= South Branch Roaring Creek =

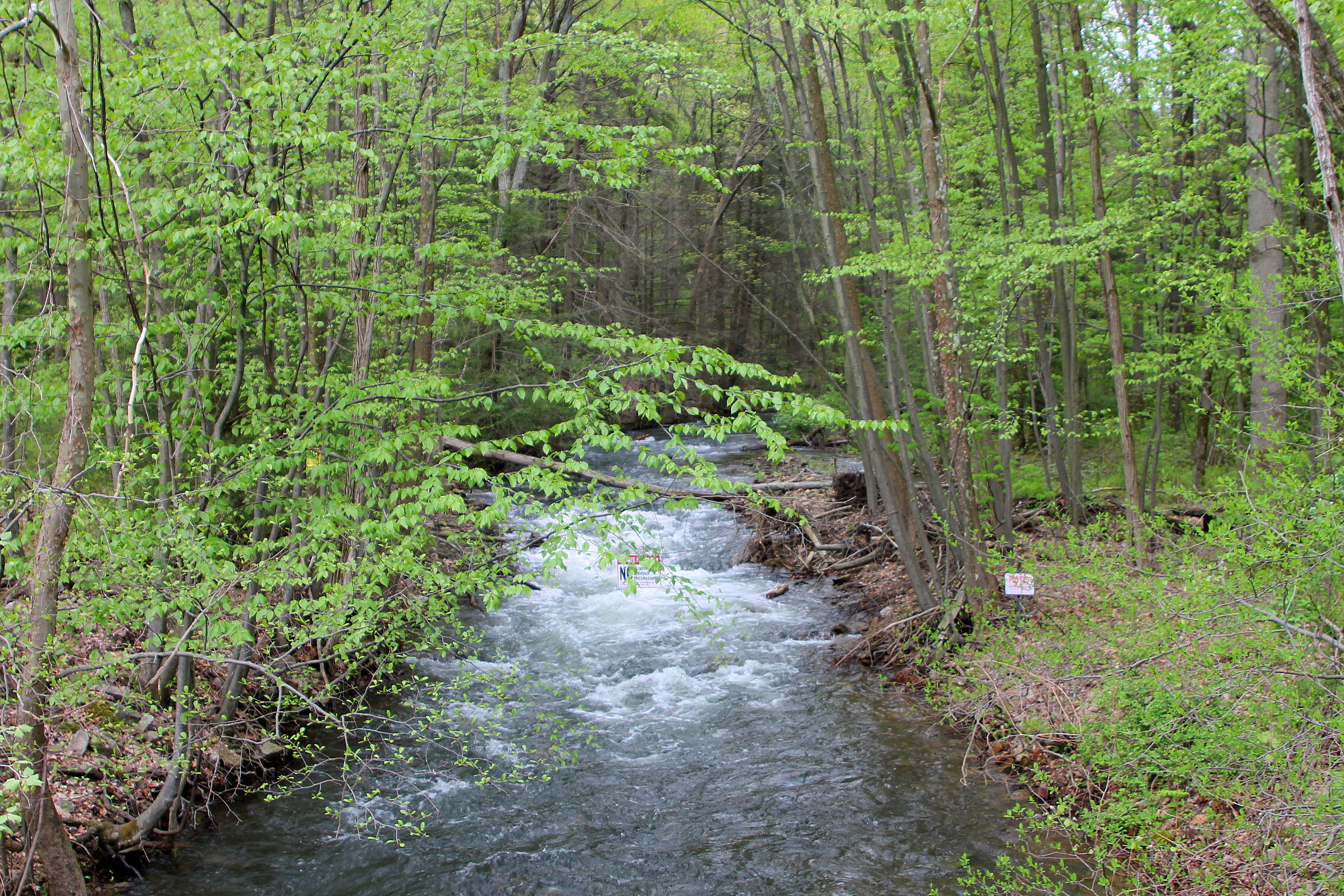
- The upper reaches of South Branch Roaring Creek, looking upstream

Physical characteristics
- Source
  - location: Conyngham Township, Columbia County, Pennsylvania
  - elevation: 1,160 feet (350 m)
- Mouth
  - location: Roaring Creek in Franklin Township, Columbia County, Pennsylvania
  - coordinates: 40°54′27″N 76°30′38″W
  - elevation: 560 feet (170 m)
- Length: 16.8 mi (27.0 km)
- Basin size: 25 sq mi (65 km^{2})
- Discharge
  - average: 33 L/s (1.2 cu ft/s)

Basin features
- Progression: Roaring Creek; Susquehanna River; Chesapeake Bay
- River system: Susquehanna River system
- Tributaries
  - right: Mugser Run

South Branch Roaring Creek is a tributary of Roaring Creek in Columbia County and Northumberland County, Pennsylvania, in the United States. It is approximately 16.8 miles (27.0 km) long. The upper reaches of the creek are located in Weiser State Forest, between Big Mountain and Little Mountain. The creek is home to some trout and is considered a high-quality coldwater fishery. The Chemung Formation occurs in the creek's watershed. The watershed is 25 square miles in area.

== Course ==
South Branch Roaring Creek starts at the eastern edge of Conyngham Township in Columbia County between Big Mountain and Little Mountain. The creek starts flowing in a westward direction. It passes under Pennsylvania Route 42 and goes through a lake. After exiting the lake, it reaches another lake and exits Columbia County.

Upon exiting Columbia County, South Branch Roaring Creek flows along the border between Mount Carmel Township in Northumberland County, and Columbia County. It continues heading west before passing briefly into Coal Township and turning north.

While heading north, South Branch Roaring Creek flows between Cleveland Township, Columbia County to the east and Northumberland County to the west. As the creek passes through Knoebels Amusement Resort, it picks up its tributary Mugser Run. It then enters Franklin Township and passes under Pennsylvania Route 487. Shortly afterwards, the creek flows into Roaring Creek.

== Hydrology ==
The waters of South Branch Roaring Creek are used as a water supply. There are four reservoirs on the creek. The reservoirs are, going downstream, the Brush Valley Reservoir, the Bear Gap #6 Reservoir, the Bear Gap #2 Reservoir, and the Bear Gap #1 Reservoir. The creek is dammed in four locations for the purpose of providing water to people in Shamokin and Mount Carmel.

The pH of South Branch Roaring Creek ranges from 5.5 to 7. This is due to the geology near the creek's headwaters, acid rain, and organic acids in the watershed.

In October and November 2007, volunteers from the Roaring Creek Valley Conservation Association performed a visual assessment of the quality of South Branch Roaring Creek, ranking seven attributes on a scale of 0 to 4, with 4 being highest-quality, thus meaning that 28 would be a perfect score. One location on the creek had a score of 24 out of 28, making it the second highest-scoring site in the watershed, behind one site on Roaring Creek. The other sites on South Branch Roaring Creek had scores of 21.5 and 16.5, and a tributary of the creek had a score of 21.

In the summer of 2006, the water temperature in South Branch Roaring Creek ranged from 17.6 °C (63.7 °F) to 22.4 °C (72.3 °F). The pH ranged from 5.38 to 6.41. The conductance ranged from 35 to 146 micro-siemens, with an average of 82 micro-siemens. The concentration of alkalinity ranged from 7 to 19 milligrams per liter, with an average of 11.8 milligrams per liter.

In the summer of 2006, the discharge of South Branch Roaring Creek was 32.9 liters per second and 33.3 liters per second in two sites, and 142.3 liters per second in a third site.

The nitrogen concentration in South Branch Roaring Creek as of 2006 ranged from 209 to 1155.5 micrograms per liter, with an average of 546.6 micrograms per liter. The phosphorus concentration in South Branch Roaring Creek as of 2006 ranged from 12.6 micrograms per liter to 26.4 micrograms per liter, with an average of 17.6 micrograms per liter.

== Geography ==
The first 10 miles (16 km) of South Branch Roaring Creek are situated in the Roaring Creek tract of Weiser State Forest, with Big Mountain to the north and Little Mountain to the south.

The Chemung formation rock beds are exposed near South Branch Roaring Creek. The creek cuts through Little Mountain at one point. The Selinsgrove axis crosses the creek as well. The valley where the upper part of the creek is located, between Big Mountain and Little Mountain, is composed of red shale.

== Watershed ==
The watershed of South Branch Roaring Creek is roughly L-shaped. The northwestern edge of the watershed is several miles north of Elysburg and the southeastern edge is several miles east of Aristes. Springs with sand bottoms are located near the headwaters. Part of Weiser State Forest is in the watershed.

The South Branch Roaring Creek watershed is 25 square miles in area. Adjacent watersheds include the Mugser Run watershed, the Lick Run watershed, and the main watershed of Roaring Creek.

== Biology ==
Both brown trout and brook trout live in South Branch Roaring Creek. Both of these fish can grow up to 17 inches (43 cm) long. The total concentration of trout ranges from 1.86 kilograms (4.1 lb) per hectare to 30.53 kilograms (67.3 lb) per hectare and 31.2 kilograms (69 lb) per hectare. The species of fish observed in the creek as of 2004 are mostly typical for a stream environment in that area. These included eastern blacknose dace, margined madtoms, and various warm-water fish which had swum into the creek from the reservoirs on it. Catch and release public fishing is permitted on the creek. It is an approved trout stream.

Several species of concern live near the creek's headwaters. The headwaters are also home to a Hemlock Palustrine Forest Natural Community. The northern long-eared bat has been observed on the creek. The forests in the upper reaches of South Branch Roaring Creek help connect forests in the Pocono Mountains to those on the Susquehanna River. In the summer of 2006, the canopy coverage on the creek was 40% at two sites and 93% at a third site.

The upper reaches of South Branch Roaring Creek have been described as "the best natural habitat in the [Columbia] county".

South Branch Roaring Creek is considered a high-quality cold-water fishery and a Class A wild trout stream.

The microinvertebrates that live at one site in South Branch Roaring Creek include 19 taxa, such as Hydropsychidae and Philopotamidae. Two species are considered abundant, one is considered common, nine are considered present, and seven are considered rare. The Hilsenhoff Pollution Tolerance Score of these microinvertebrates range from 0 (with two species) to 10 (with Oligochaeta). In another site, a total of 21 taxa of microinvertebrates have been observed. Hydropsychidae and Philopotamidae are the most abundant. Two species are considered abundant, two are considered common, ten are considered present, and seven are considered rare. The Hilsenhoff Pollution Tolerance Score of these microinvertebrates range from 0 in two cases to 9 in Turbellaria and 10 in Oligochaeta. The total algal biomass (as measured in micrograms of chlorophyll per square centimeter) in the creek as of 2006 ranged from 0.9 to 3.81, with an average of 2.07.

== History ==
In 2003, the Pennsylvania Department of Conservation and Natural Resources purchased 9000 acres of land along South Branch Roaring Creek.

== See also ==
- Lawrence L. Knoebel Covered Bridge
- List of rivers in Pennsylvania
