= Lawrence L. Knoebel Covered Bridge =

- U.S. National Register of Historic Places
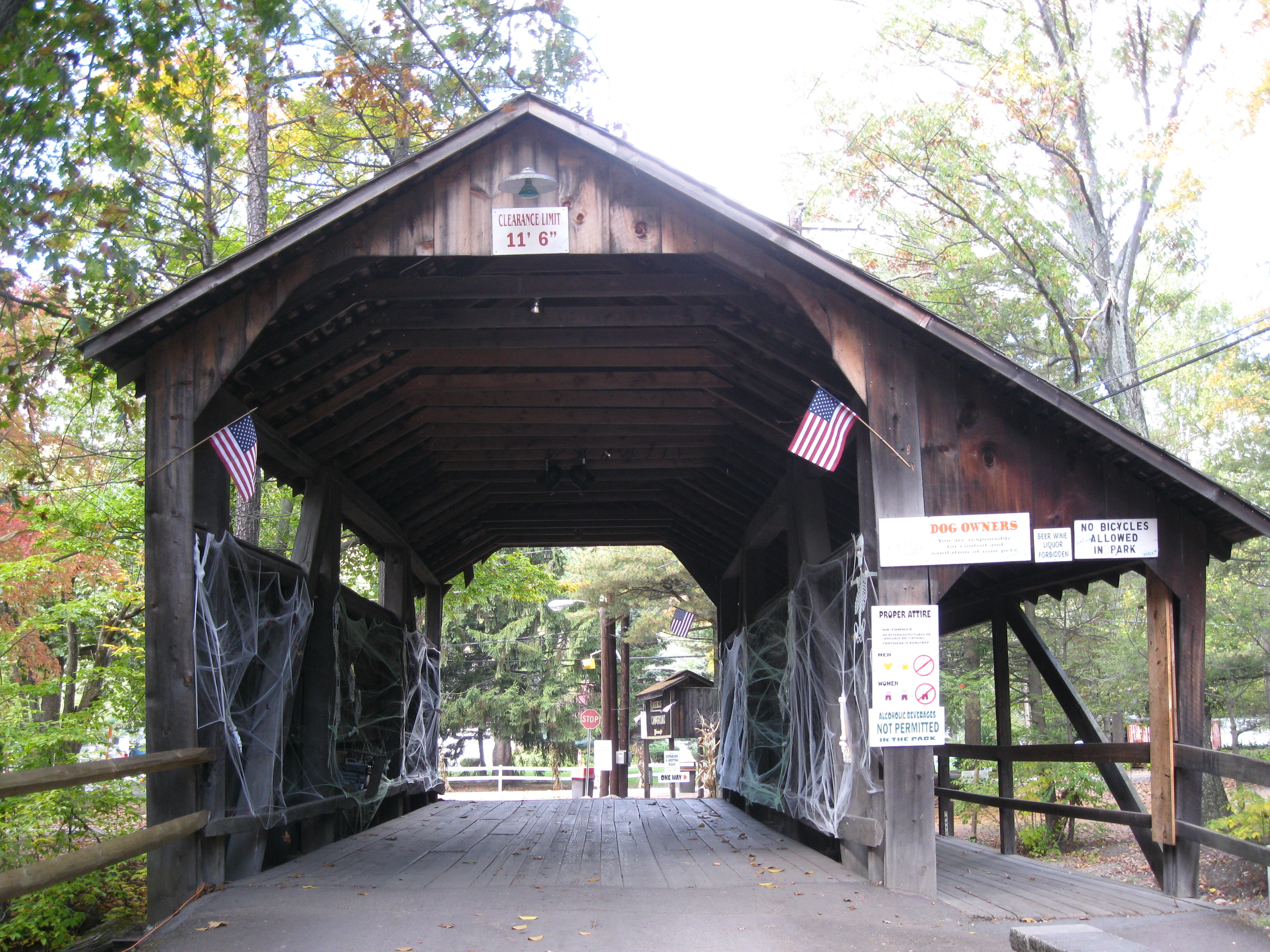
- The bridge decorated for Halloween in 2012

- Location within Pennsylvania Location within the United States
- Location: Knoebel's Grove, Ralpho Township, Cleveland Township and Ralpho Township, Pennsylvania
- Coordinates: 40°52′38″N 76°30′21″W
- Area: 0.1 acres (0.040 ha)
- Built: 1875
- Architectural style: Modified Queenpost truss
- MPS: Covered Bridges of Northumberland County TR
- NRHP reference No.: 79002309
- Added to NRHP: August 8, 1979

The Lawrence L. Knoebel Covered Bridge is a historic wooden covered bridge located at Knoebels Amusement Resort in Elysburg, Pennsylvania. It connects Cleveland Township in Columbia County, Pennsylvania and Ralpho Township in Northumberland County, Pennsylvania.

It was listed on the National Register of Historic Places in 1979.

== History and architectural features ==
This historic structure is a 40-foot-long (12 m) modified Queen Post Truss bridge with a wood shingled roof. Erected in 1875, it was moved to its current location between 1935 and 1937, and crosses South Branch Roaring Creek. It is one of twenty-eight historic covered bridges that are located in Columbia and Montour counties.
