= Lick Run (Roaring Creek tributary) =

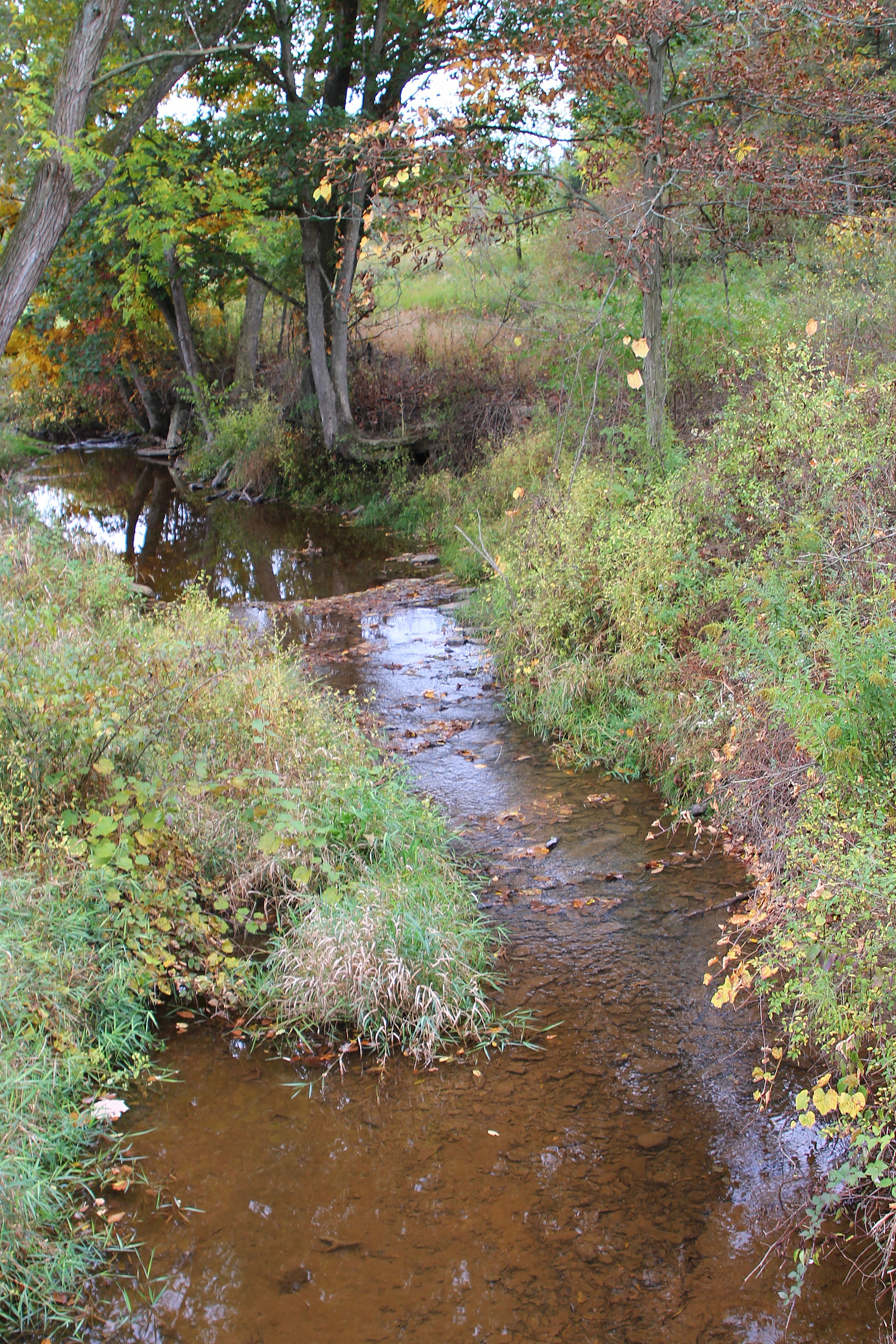
- Lick Run in its lower reaches

Physical characteristics
- Source
  - location: Locust Township, Columbia County, Pennsylvania
- Mouth
  - location: Roaring Creek in Locust Township, Columbia County, Pennsylvania
  - coordinates: 40°53′51″N 76°23′17″W
  - elevation: 810 ft (250 m)
- Length: 4.2 mi (6.8 km)
- Basin size: 5.97 sq mi (15.5 km^{2})

Lick Run is a small tributary of Roaring Creek in Columbia County, Pennsylvania, in the United States. It is approximately 4.2 miles (6.8 km) long. It is entirely in Locust Township. Its watershed has an area of 5.97 square miles. It is designated as a coldwater fishery and Class A Wild Trout Waters. Brown trout inhabit it, as to 14 other fish species. Numerous species of macroinvertebrate also inhabit the stream.

== Course ==
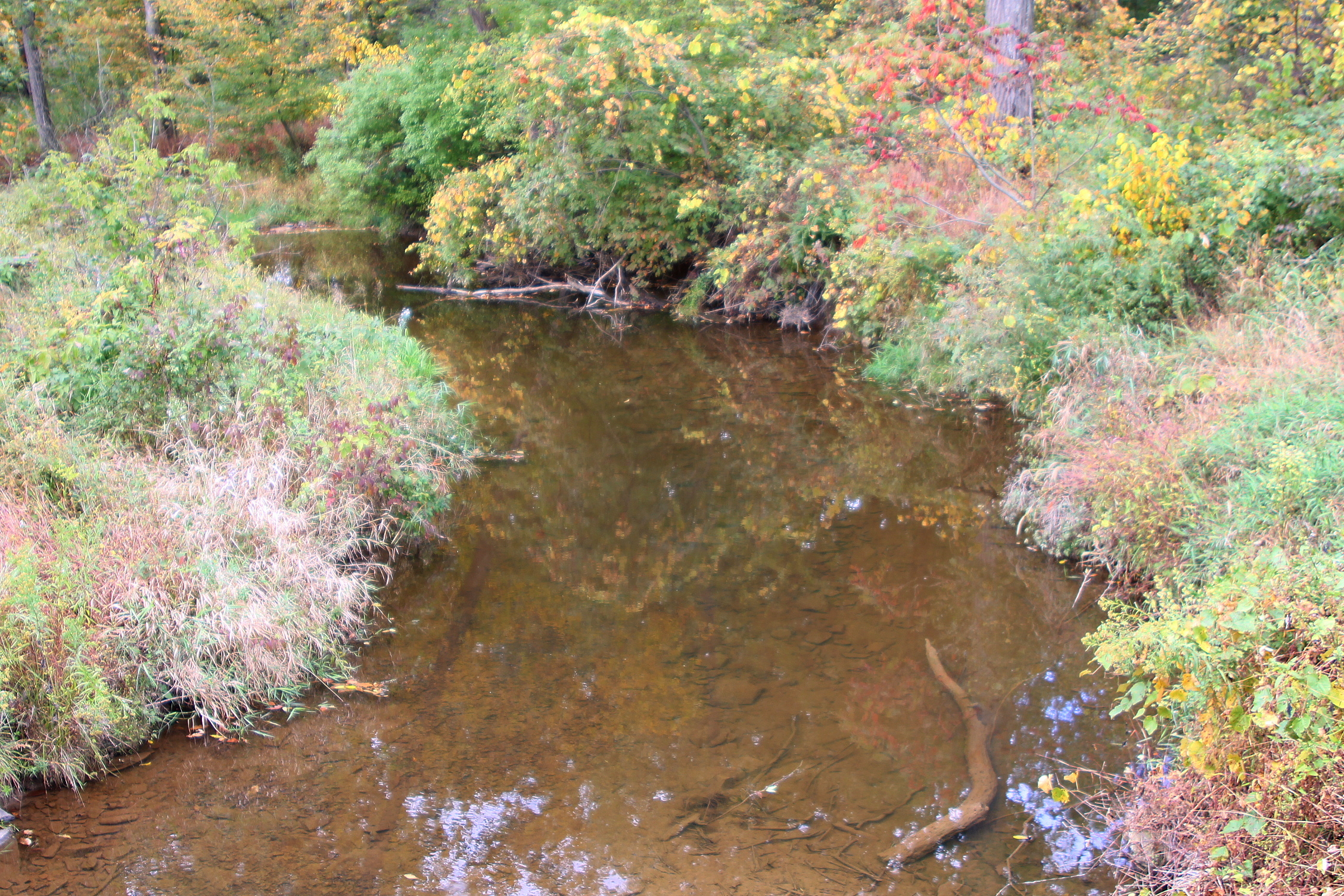
Lick Run in its lower reaches

Lick Run starts in southern Locust Township north of a mountain. It flows northeast into central Locust Township and then turns north for a short distance. The stream then turns northeast, passing the community of Newlin, and then gradually turns north again. Shortly downstream, it enters Roaring Creek some distance southeast of Slabtown.

Lick Run joins Roaring Creek 14.08 miles (22.66 km) upstream of its mouth.

== Hydrology, geography, and geology ==
In a visual assessment on a scale of 0 to 28 (with a higher number indicating higher quality), Lick Run scored 16.5 at Poorhouse Road. At Mill Road, near its mouth, the stream scored 20.5.

Lick Run experiences siltation in its lower reaches.

2.24 miles (3.60 km) upstream of its mouth, the water temperature of Lick Run was observed to be 17.4 °C (63.3 °F) on July 31, 2003. At its mouth, the temperature was 18.3 °C (64.9 °F) on the same day.

Lick Run is 4.2 miles (6.8 km) long and 3.8 metres (12 ft) wide. Its elevation decreases at a rate of 13.8 metres (45 ft) per kilometer. The stream has an elevation of 810 feet (250 m) about sea level at its mouth.

== Watershed ==
Lick Run is in the Catawissa, Mount Carmel, and Ashland United States Geological Survey quadrangles. The stream's watershed has an area of 5.97 square miles.

56 percent of Lick Run is within 100 metres (330 ft) of a road and 97 percent is within 300 metres (980 ft) of a road. All of the stream's length is within 500 metres (1,600 ft) of a road. None of the stream is public, but 70 percent of it is private and open. The remaining 30 percent is private and closed.

The population density of the watershed of Lick Run was 30 people per square kilometer in 2000.

== Fish ==
Lick Run is designated as a coldwater fishery. The Roaring Creek Watershed Coldwater Conservation Plan has suggested that it be promoted to high-quality coldwater fishery status. It has also been a Class A Wild Trout Water for brown trout. The stream was stocked by the Pennsylvania Fish and Boat Commission until 1982.

Fifteen species of fish, including brown trout, bass, sculpin, chub, suckers, and minnows, inhabit Lick Run. Ten are present in the stream's middle reaches and fourteen are present at its mouth. The population of brown trout in the stream is 47.38 kilograms (104.5 lb) per hectare. The biomass of these fish has remained mostly constant since 1976, except in 1982 when there were only 20.73 kilograms (45.7 lb) per hectare. There are 64 brown trout longer than 7 inches (18 cm) per kilometer of the stream and an estimated 451 between 7 inches (18 cm) and 18 inches (46 cm) long in the entire stream.

== Macroinvertebrates ==
Near Poorhouse Road on Lick Run, the macroinvertebrates Isonychiidae and Hydropsychidae are common, with 10 to 25 individuals of each being observed during a biological survey here. The macroinvertebrates Cambaridae, Ephemerellidae, Peltoperlidae, Nigronia, Philoptamidae, and Rhyacophilidae are less common, with a biological survey observing 3 to 9 individuals of each. The taxa Oligochaeta, Oligochaeta, Turbellaria, Baetidae, Perlidae, and Ptilodactylidae are rare, with fewer than three individuals of each taxon being observed during a biological survey here.

== See also ==
- South Branch Roaring Creek
- Mugser Run
- List of rivers of Pennsylvania
