= Mill Creek (Roaring Creek tributary) =

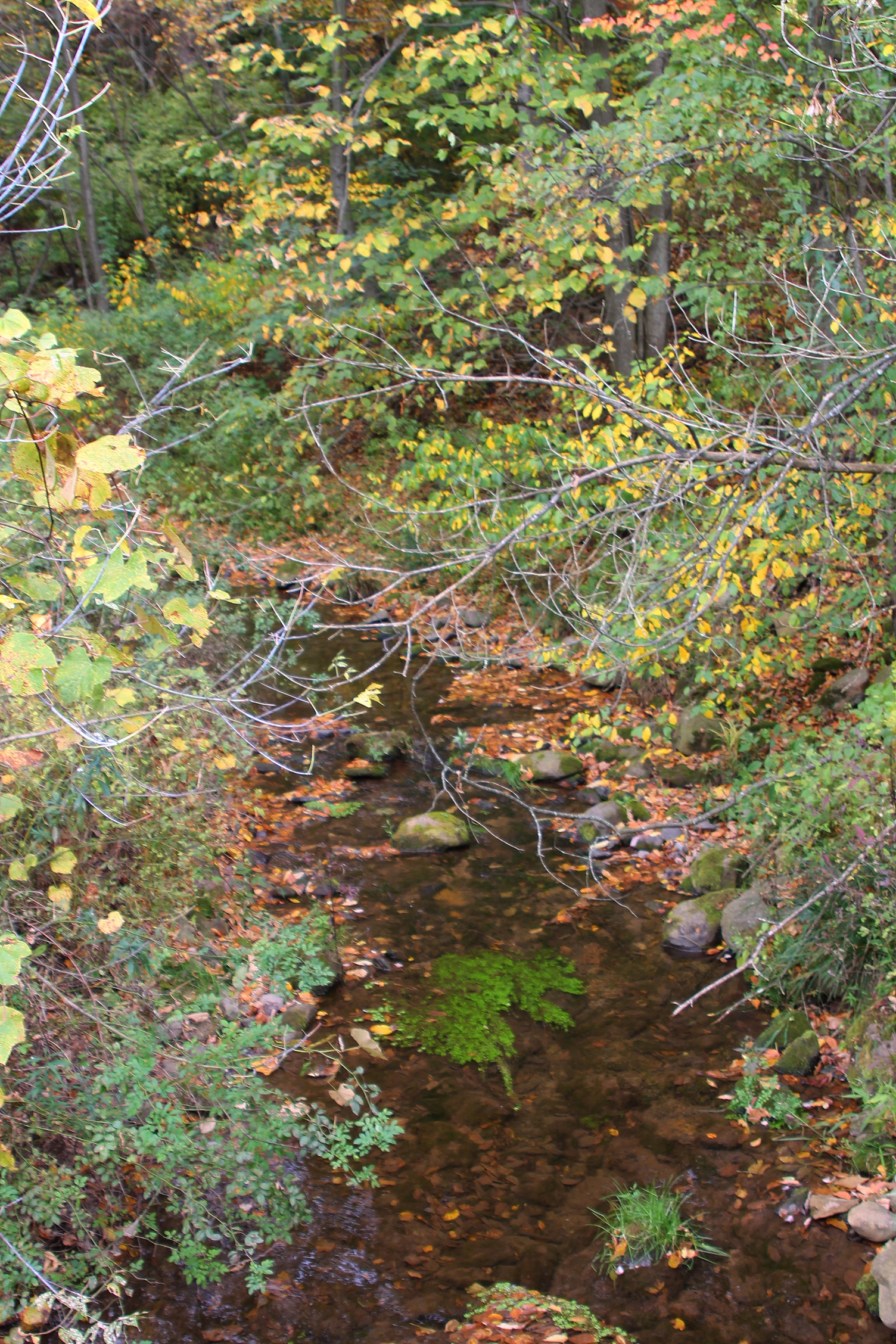
- Mill Creek in its upper reaches
- Etymology: named after the Mowrey Mill

Physical characteristics
- Source
  - location: Catawissa Mountain in Roaring Creek Township, Pennsylvania
  - elevation: 1,380 to 1,400 feet (420 to 430 m)
- Mouth
  - location: Roaring Creek in Locust Township, Columbia County, Pennsylvania
  - coordinates: 40°53′37″N 76°22′20″W
  - elevation: 846 ft (258 m)
- Length: 3.1 mi (5.0 km)
- Basin size: 4.98 mi^{2} (12.9 km^{2})

Basin features
- Progression: Roaring Creek → Susquehanna River → Chesapeake Bay

Mill Creek is a tributary of Roaring Creek in Columbia County, Pennsylvania, in the United States. It is approximately 3.1 miles (5.0 km) long and flows through Roaring Creek Township and Locust Township. The watershed of the creek has an area of 4.98 square miles (12.9 km^{2}). The creek is considered to be a High-Quality Coldwater Fishery and Class A Wild Trout Waters. Numerous species of macroinvertebrates inhabit it. The creek was named from the presence of a mill.

== Course ==
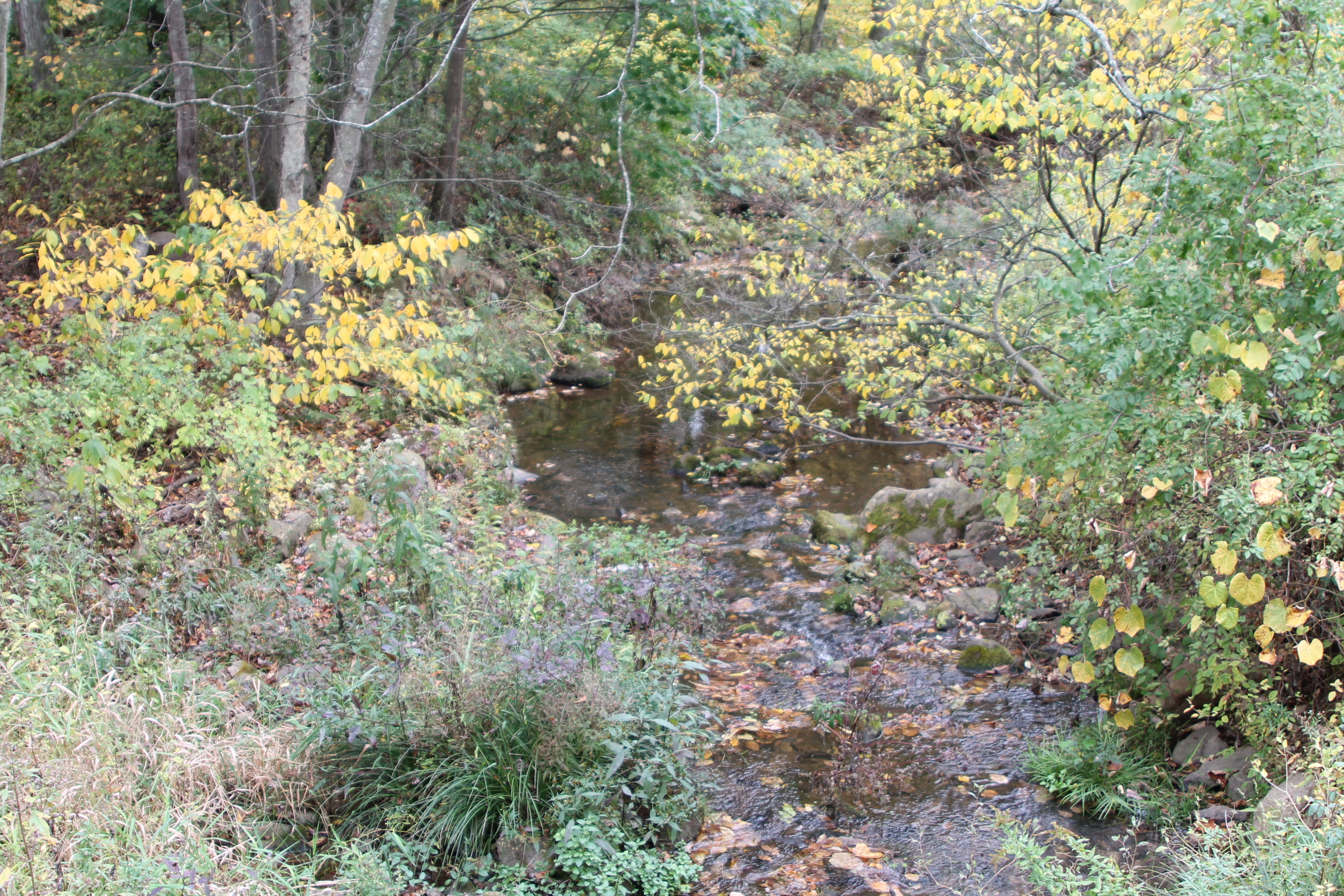
Mill Creek in its upper reaches

Mill Creek begins on Catawissa Mountain in Roaring Creek Township. It flows south-southwest for slightly over a thousand feet before turning southwest for several tenths of a mile. It then turns west for a few tenths of a mile before turning southwest and receiving an unnamed tributary. The creek then turns west-northwest and passes through the community of Kulp. Near Kulp, it crosses State Route 2003 and flows west-southwest for approximately a mile, flowing through a valley. The creek then enters Locust Township and turns west, leaving the valley and flowing through a plain. After a few tenths of a mile, it reaches its confluence with Roaring Creek.

Mill Creek joins Roaring Creek 15.02 miles (24.17 km) upstream of its mouth.

=== Tributaries ===
Mill Creek has two unnamed tributaries.

== Hydrology ==
The concentration of alkalinity in the waters of Mill Creek is 11 milligrams per liter. The pH of the creek is 6.6. The total concentration of water hardness is 20 milligrams per liter. The creek is significantly impacted by agriculture.

At 2:25 P.M. on June 14, 2004, the air temperature in the vicinity of Mill Creek at a point 1.30 miles (2.09 km) upstream of its mouth was 24.0 °C (75.2 °F). The water temperature of the creek at that place and time was 14.8 °C (58.6 °F). The specific conductivity of the creek's waters is 49 micromhos.

A visual assessment of Mill Creek in October 2007 had a result of 19 out of 28. Its scores on the seven components of the assessment were mostly 3 on a scale of 1 to 4, but it also scored 2 on some components.

Mill Creek is an infertile stream with cold water.

== Geography ==
The elevation near the mouth of Mill Creek is 846 feet (258 m) above sea level. The elevation of the creek's source is between 1,380 feet (420 m) and 1,400 feet (430 m).

Mill Creek is a relatively small stream, with a width of 4.2 feet (1.3 m). It has a gradient of 29.8 meters per kilometer. There are deep holes on the creek, which are described as an "excellent physical habitat" in the Roaring Creek Coldwater Conservation Plan.

== Watershed ==
The watershed of Mill Creek has an area of 4.98 square miles (12.9 km^{2}). The mouth of the creek is in the east-central part of Locust Township. There are forests for most of its length and also forests along most of the lengths of its unnamed tributaries. The creek is the smallest tributary of Roaring Creek.

A total of 48 percent of the length of Mill Creek is within 100 metres (330 ft) of a road. 82 percent is within 300 metres (980 ft) of a road and 90 percent is within 500 metres (1,600 ft) of one. It is difficult to access portions of Mill Creek because the entire length of the creek is on private land that is closed to the public. In 2000, the population density of the watershed was 18 people per square kilometer.

Mill Creek is in the United States Geological Survey quadrangle of Shumans. The headwaters of the creek are near the Pennsylvania State Game Lands Number 58.

== History and etymology ==
Mill Creek is named after a mill known as the Mowrey Mill. This mill was built by Abner Hampton in 1820. Volunteers from the Roaring Creek Valley Conservation Association performed a visual assessment on the creek on October 1, 2007. However, the creek is the only stream in the watershed of Roaring Creek that was not studied by the Pennsylvania Fish and Boat Commission prior to a 2009 survey of the watershed.

== Biology ==
Mill Creek is considered by the Pennsylvania Fish and Boat Commission to be Class A Wild Trout Waters between its headwaters and its mouth. The creek is also considered by the Pennsylvania Department of Environmental Protection to be a High-Quality Coldwater Fishery. It is inhabited by both brook trout and brown trout. A total of five species of fish inhabit the creek: brook trout, brown trout, eastern blacknose dace, white suckers, and creek chub. The Roaring Creek Coldwater Conservation Plan advises against the stocking of trout in the creek.

The biomass of wild brown trout in Mill Creek is 48.28 kilograms per hectare and the biomass of wild brown trout is 23.92 kilograms per hectare. There are an estimated 110 brown trout per kilometer that are more than 7 inches (18 cm) in length and an estimated 83 brook trout per kilometer of that length. There are an estimated 561 brown trout and 423 brook trout more than 7 inches (18 cm) in length in the creek. The largest brook trout are 11 inches (28 cm) long and the largest brown trout are 12 inches (30 cm) long. Mill Creek is the only stream in the watershed of Roaring Creek where wild brook trout are common.

A total of 24 macroinvertebrate taxa inhabit Mill Creek. The taxa Hydropsychidae, Nigronia, and Philopotamidae are common in the creek. Macroinvertebrate taxa that are less common, but still present, include Ephemerellidae, Gomphidae, Heptageniidae, Limnephilidae, Perlidae, Perlodidae, Pteronarcyidae, and Sialidae. Rare macroinvertebrate taxa in the creek include Baetidae, Cambaridae, Dytiscidae, Ephemeridae, Isonychiidae, Leptophlebiidae, Limnephilidae, and several others.

== See also ==
- List of rivers of Pennsylvania
- Lick Run (Roaring Creek), next tributary of Roaring Creek going downstream
