= Wagner Covered Bridge No. 19 =

- U.S. National Register of Historic Places
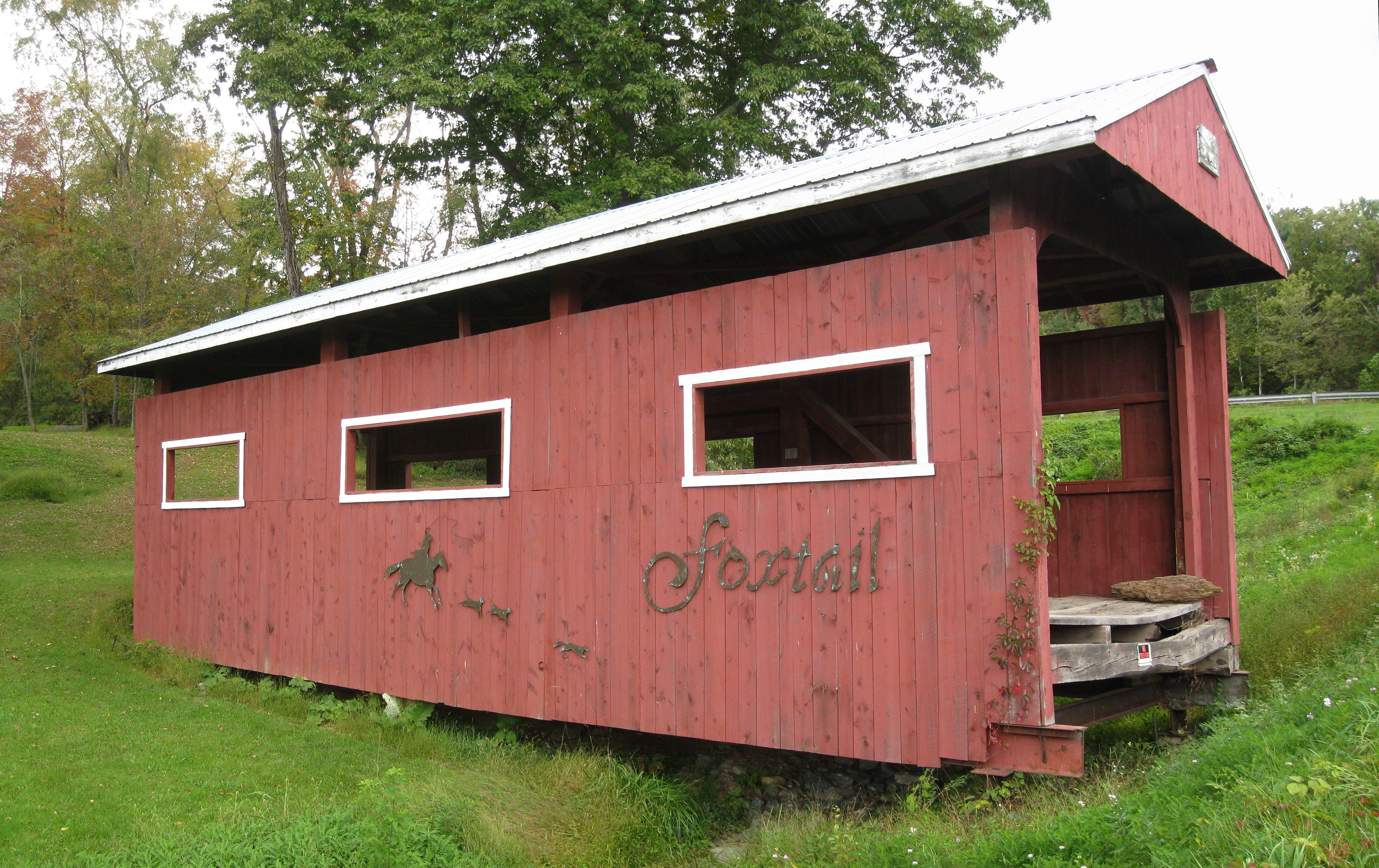
- The bridge relocated to the entrance of the Foxtail housing development in Bloomsburg, Pennsylvania in September 2012.

- Location within Pennsylvania Location within the United States
- Location: Pennsylvania Route 468, Locust Township, Pennsylvania
- Coordinates: 40°53′32″N 76°22′28″W
- Area: 0.1 acres (0.040 ha)
- Built: 1856
- Built by: Dan Kostenbauder
- Architectural style: Queen Post Truss
- MPS: Covered Bridges of Columbia and Montour Counties TR
- NRHP reference No.: 79003178
- Added to NRHP: November 29, 1979

The Wagner Covered Bridge No. 19 is an historic wooden covered bridge that was originally built in Locust Township in Columbia County, Pennsylvania, United States.

It was listed on the National Register of Historic Places in 1979. The bridge was dismantled on March 23, 1981, and the pieces stored at Knoebels Amusement Resort until it was rebuilt at the entrance to a housing development in Hemlock Township in 1994.

== History and architectural features ==
When built in 1856, this historic structure was a 56.5-foot-long (17.2 m), Queen Post Truss bridge with a tarred metal roof. It originally crossed the North Branch of Roaring Creek and was one of twenty-eight historic covered bridges that were located in Columbia and Montour Counties.

It was listed on the National Register of Historic Places in 1979. The bridge was dismantled on March 23, 1981, and the pieces stored at Knoebels Amusement Resort until it was rebuilt at the entrance to a housing development in Hemlock Township in 1994. The coordinates above refer to the bridge's original location, its new location is 40°59.93′N 76°28.96′W.
