= Davis Covered Bridge =

- U.S. National Register of Historic Places
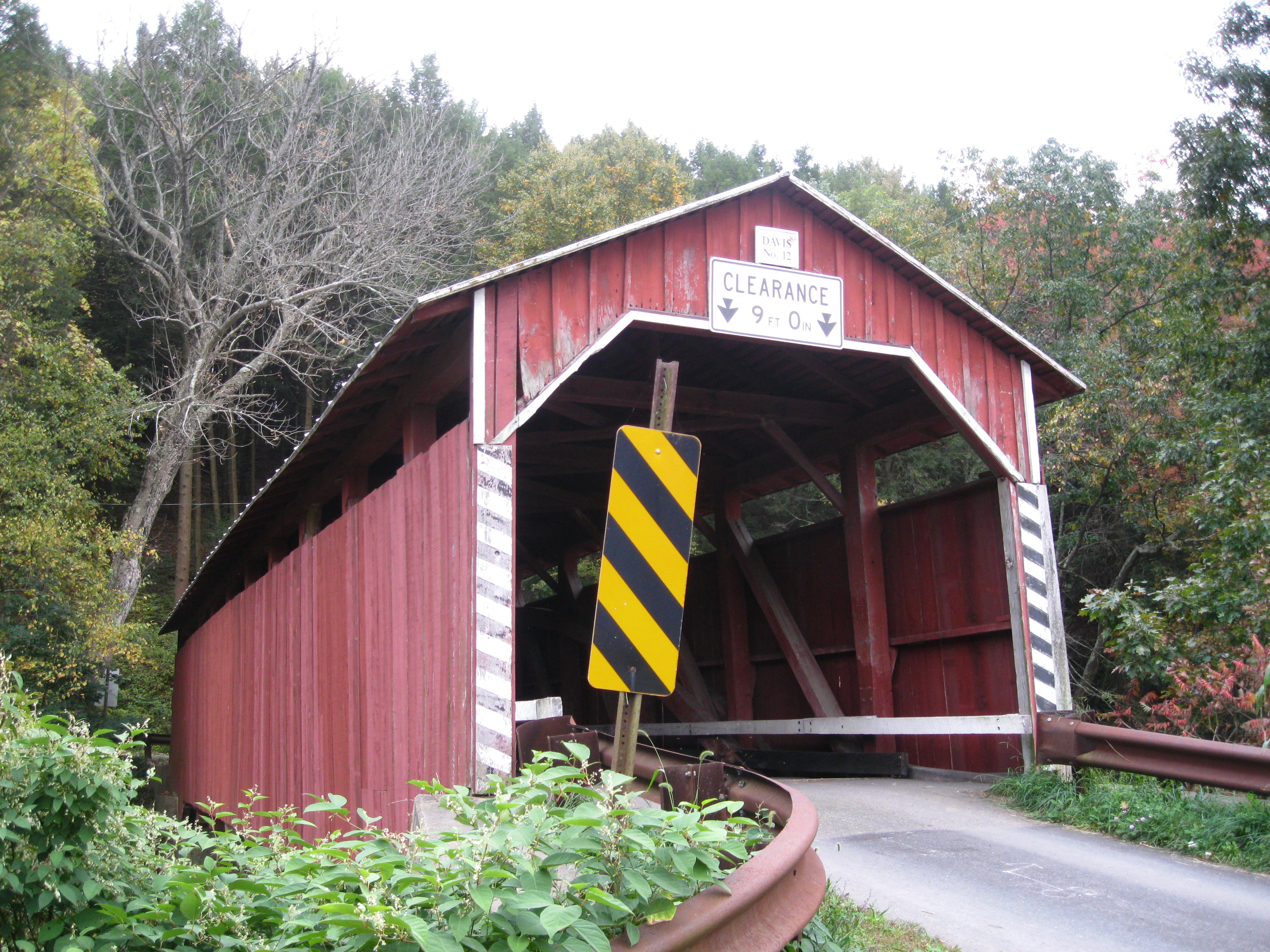
- The bridge in September 2012

- Location within Pennsylvania Location within the United States
- Location: Pennsylvania Route 371, south of Catawissa, Cleveland Township, Pennsylvania
- Coordinates: 40°54′40″N 76°26′24″W
- Area: 0.1 acres (0.040 ha)
- Built: 1850
- Built by: D. Kostenbauder
- Architectural style: Burr Truss-Arch
- MPS: Covered Bridges of Columbia and Montour Counties TR
- NRHP reference No.: 79003191
- Added to NRHP: November 29, 1979

The Davis Covered Bridge is a historic wooden covered bridge located at Cleveland Township in Columbia County, Pennsylvania. It is a 87.1-foot-long (26.5 m), Burr Truss arch bridge, with a tarred metal roof, constructed in 1850. It crosses the North Branch of Roaring Creek. It is one of 28 historic covered bridges in Columbia and Montour Counties.

It was listed on the National Register of Historic Places in 1979.
