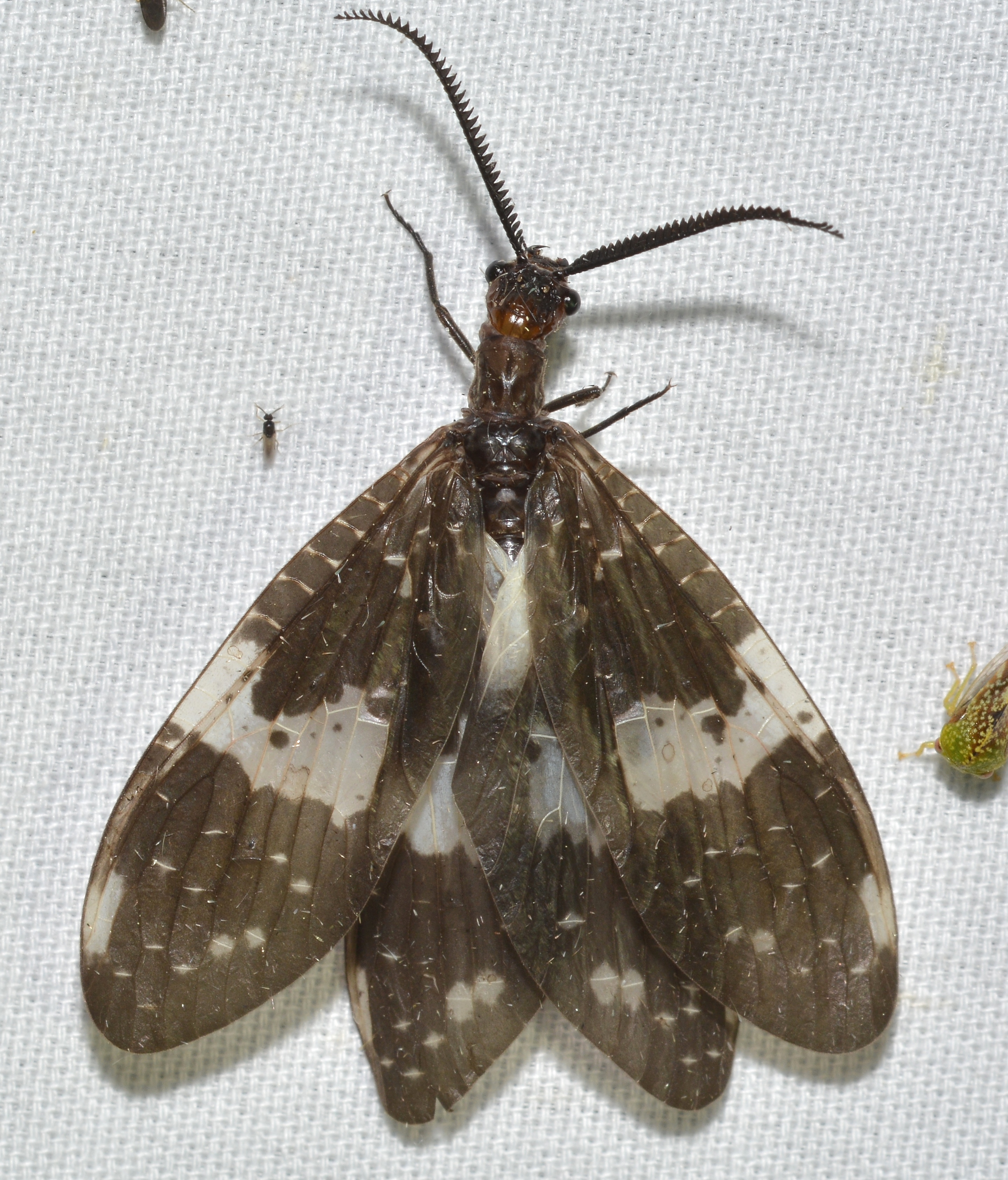

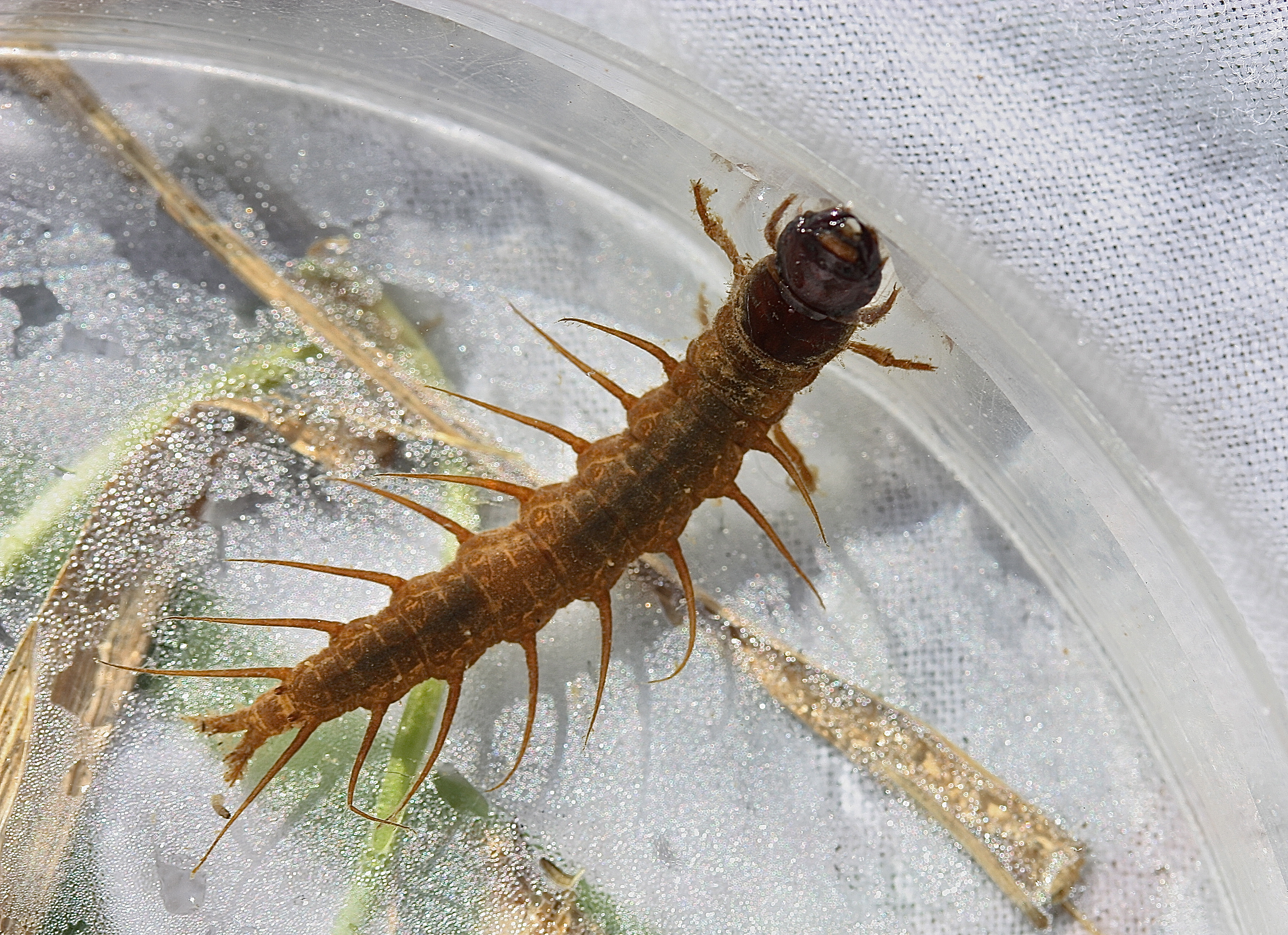

Scientific classification
- Domain: Eukaryota
- Kingdom: Animalia
- Phylum: Arthropoda
- Class: Insecta
- Order: Megaloptera
- Family: Corydalidae
- Genus: Nigronia
- Species: N. serricornis

Binomial name
- Nigronia serricornis (Say, 1824)

= Nigronia serricornis =

Species of insect

Nigronia serricornis has many common names including hellgrammites or fishflies or saw-combed fishflies. The genus Nigronia has one other North American member N. fasciatus and South American which lives in much of the same territory and is quite similar in all regards. They are holometabolous insects with an aquatic larval stage. N. serricornis is a common inhabitant of woodland streams in North America and they are often the largest insect predator found in 2nd and 3rd order streams. The larvae are a sit-and -wait ambush predators that feed on a large variety of invertebrates. Studies have shown that N. serricornis has a varying diet throughout the seasons.

== Distribution ==
Despite this small organism's limited ability to disperse it has managed to spread throughout the Eastern United States. The range of N. serricornis expands northward from Florida into Ontario, and west to the US Rocky Mountains. By using genetic analyses, Heilveil and Berlocher (2006) have identified that there are six major clades of N. serricornis. The ancestral clade in the north end of their range, represent the initial colonization of N. serricornis on the Eastern US. This clade was separated from the derived clade by the Appalachian Mountains.

== Diet ==
N. serricomis is an active predator and has a varied diet consisting of many smaller invertebrates such as midges, caddisflies, black flies, mayflies, ostracods, and small crustaceans. Studies have shown that N. serricomis changes its diet from season to season and even from month to month. N. serricomis larvae feed by foraging with their mandibles open and quickly closing them upon contact with prey.

== Development ==
N. serricornis likely has a three week life cycle consisting of an egg, larva, pupa and adult stages. The larvae live for up to three years in aquatic environments hunting invertebrates and are the only life stage which feeds. The pupa then crawls out of the water onto rotting logs or near the shore to pupate in shallow chambers for up to three weeks. After the adults emerge from the chambers, they need up to an hour to dry before they can fly away and find mates, although they are relatively poor fliers, so they do not move very far from their pupation site. The adults only live for about a week and in this time, they need to mate, and the female needs to find a site to deposit her eggs, known as an oviposition. The female chooses a site for depositing her eggs on structures that overhang water, such as leaves or bridges, which allow the newly hatching larva to fall directly into the water and as such the adults to not have to invest any further resources to their offspring. The females seem to choose their oviposition on locations that are unoccupied by other egg masses but otherwise the sites are not limited to any preference for egg deposit.

== Oxygen consumption ==
Most insects, especially aquatic insects, have shown to have fluctuation in their oxygen consumption due to the weight and size of the organism, the temperature and/or chemistry of the water or the season of the year it is. Year-round presence of N. serricomis larvae in streams results in generally stable respiratory responses to temperature. Physiologically, N. serricomis larvae are adapted to maintain a constant oxygen consumption regardless of temperature, season or stage of larval development. This consistency allows N. serricomis larvae to vary their metabolism in direct relation to its surrounding water temperature.

== Interactions with other organisms ==
Nigronia serricomis larvae, being predators, have to compete with other predators in their streams. This has been observed in Michigan between N. serricornis and Corydalus cornutus. This interspecific competition affects the N. serricornis very little due to their generalized diet but when the two do interact Corydalus cornutus dominates. One interesting interaction N. serricornis has is with a small ectoparasite, Nanocladius rectinervis. This tiny animal lives in a silk tube attached to its host, usually on the mesothorax, and feeds on the detrital material that its host does not fully consume and gets caught up in body folds. They also gain the added stability, protection and mobility by choosing to attach to a mobile predator which has behavioural and morphological adaptions to live in strong currents.
