= Lake Glory =

- Lake Adell Marie, Lake Adele Marie
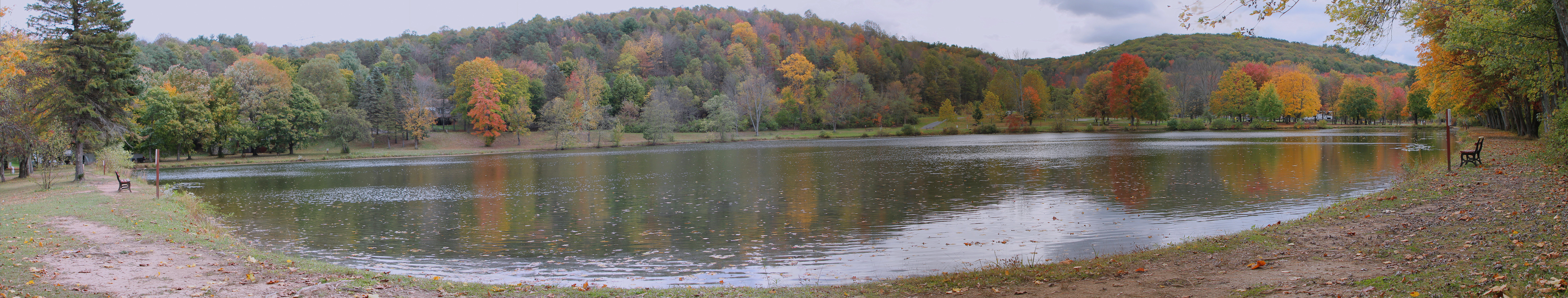
- Panorama of Lake Glory (view full size)

- Location within Pennsylvania Location within the United States
- Location: Cleveland Township, Columbia County, Pennsylvania
- Coordinates: 40°54′19″N 76°27′31″W
- Type: reservoir
- Etymology: "inspirational name"
- Surface area: 5.4 acres (2.2 ha)
- Surface elevation: 643 feet (196 m)

Lake Glory (also known as Lake Adell Marie or Lake Adele Marie) is a reservoir in Columbia County, Pennsylvania, in the United States. It has a surface area of approximately 5.4 acres (2.2 ha) and is situated in Cleveland Township. The lake is in the vicinity of Roaring Creek, Pennsylvania Route 487, and Pennsylvania Route 42. It was first developed in the 1950s and by the 1970s was a significant recreational area in the region. The reservoir is located near the Lake Glory Campground.

== Geography ==
According to The National Map, Lake Glory is not situated on any stream. However, it is located only a few hundred feet from Roaring Creek. The reservoir has an elevation of 643 feet (196 m) above sea level. The lake is entirely within the United States Geological Survey quadrangle of Catawissa.

Lake Glory is a manmade lake. It is situated within the Lake Glory Campground.

Lake Glory is in the vicinity of Pennsylvania Route 487 and Pennsylvania Route 42.

== History ==
Lake Glory was entered into the Geographic Names Information System on September 1, 1989. Its identifier in the Geographic Names Information System is 1212533. The lake was added to the Geographic Names Information System because it appears in a county highway map by the Pennsylvania Department of Transportation. The reservoir was historically known as Lake Adele Marie or Lake Adell Marie, after Adell Norwich Sircovics, the wife of the lake's first owner.

Lake Glory was first developed in the 1950s. The lake eventually came to be owned by Charles King, who changed its name to its current one. The lake's etymology is described in Walter M. Brasch's 1982 book Columbia County Place Names as an "inspirational name".

A clam bake was held at Lake Glory by a post of the American Legion in the summer of 1967. During the 1970s, the area in the vicinity of the lake was one of the main locations of seasonal development in the area.

== Biology ==
In the 1970s, Lake Glory was stocked at least once with brook trout, rainbow trout, northern pike, yellow perch, bass, and catfish.

== Recreation ==
In 1970, a fish catching competition was held at Lake Glory, with cash prizes being offered to those who caught the longest trout and the most fish.

By the 1970s, Lake Glory was a recreational area of "regional significance". A private campground known as the Lake Glory Campground was developed at the lake in the 1950s and was named at the same time as Lake Glory. It has an area of 110 acres (45 ha).

== See also ==
- List of lakes in Pennsylvania
