= Mugser Run =

Stream in Columbia County, Pennsylvania, United States

Coordinates: 40°52′42″N 76°30′14″W

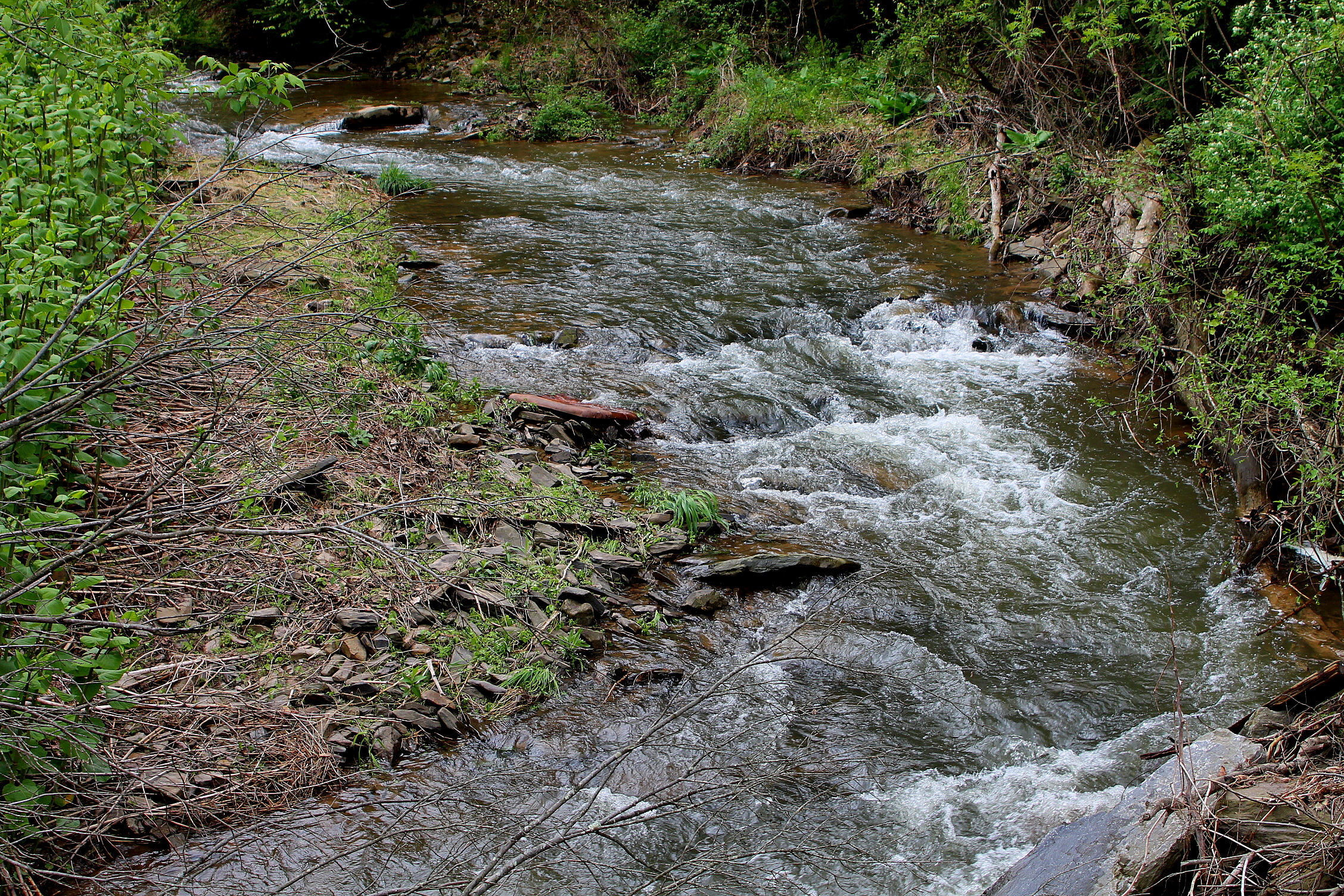
Mugser Run about 3.6 miles (5.8 km) downstream of its headwaters

Mugser Run is a 8.0-mile-long (12.9 km) stream in Columbia County, Pennsylvania, in the United States. It is a tributary of South Branch Roaring Creek. Mugser Run is located in Locust and Cleveland Townships. Forested land and agricultural land are by far the most common uses of land in the watershed. Brown trout and rainbow trout are found in the creek. The main rock formations are the Trimmers Rock Formation and the Catskill Formation–Buddys Run formation.

== Course ==
Mugser Run starts in near Pennsylvania Route 42 in Locust Township, between Numidia and Little Mountain. The creek flows west into Cleveland Township after a short distance. Upon entering Cleveland Township, it turns south and briefly skirts the northern edge of Little Mountain before turning north again. It passes by the community of Fisherdale and turns west, then turns north. For a while, the creek flows into a deep and narrow river valley. The valley widens out as the creek passes by a covered bridge. Just before its mouth, it enters Knoebels Amusement Resort. The creek empties into South Branch Roaring Creek at the Northumberland County line inside the park just under Knoebels Crystal Pool.

Mugser Run has at least one tributary.

== Watershed ==
Forested land is the largest land use in the Mugser Run watershed, with 50.24% of the watershed consisting of forests. 45.65% of the land in the watershed of Mugser Run is devoted to agriculture. The third-largest use of land in the watershed is developed land, which takes up 4.11% of the watershed.

The southern edge of the Mugser Run watershed is on Little Mountain and the northern edge is in the rolling hills of Cleveland Township. The western edge is in Locust Township and the eastern edge is at the Columbia/Northumberland County line.

The area of the Mugser Run watershed is 11.9 square miles.

A total of 3805.4 acres of land in the Mugser Run watershed consist of forest. 1781.6 acres of land in the Mugser Run watershed are devoted to hay or pastures. 1685.3 acres in the watershed consist of cropland. 276 acres of land are in low-intensity development. 19.8 acres are land in transition, 12.4 acres are unpaved roads, 9.9 acres are from wetlands, and 2.5 acres are high-intensity development.

On 61% to 66% of Mugser Run, there is a road within 100 metres (330 ft). On 75% to 83% of the creek, there is a road within 300 metres (980 ft). There is no location in Mugser Run that is not within 500 metres (1,600 ft) of a road.

== Hydrology ==
The average annual amount of precipitation in the Mugser Run watershed from 1991 to 2011 was 39.3 inches (100 cm). The average annual amount of runoff in the same period was 0.22 inches (0.56 cm).

9,515.1925 pounds (4,316.0187 kg) of sediment per day flow through Mugser Run. 7,515.1233 pounds (3,408.8026 kg) per day come from cropland. 702.2062 pounds (318.5154 kg) per day come from stream banks. A total of 509.4247 pounds (231.0712 kg) of sediment are contributed from hay and pasturelands. 229.7532 pounds (104.2143 kg) per day come from low-intensity development. Forests contribute 483.0685 pounds (219.1162 kg) per day. Unpaved roads contribute 44.0548 pounds (19.9829 kg) of sediment per day and land in transition contributes 31.3973 pounds (14.2416 kg) per day. 0.1096 pounds (0.0497 kg) per day come from high-intensity development and 0.0548 pounds (0.0249 kg) per day come from wetlands.

In the summer of 2006, the temperature of Mugser Run ranged from 19.7 °C (67.5 °F) and the site MURU1 to 22.3 °C (72.1 °F) at the site MURU3. The specific conductance of the creek ranges from 93 micro-siemens to 102 micro-siemens per cubic centimeter. The pH of the creek is slightly acidic, ranging from 6.33 to 6.84. The discharge of the creek ranges from 35.2 to 42.8 liters per second.

In the summer of 2006, the concentration of nitrogen in the waters of Mugser Run ranged from 1119.3 micrograms per liter to 1613.6 micrograms per liter. The concentration of phosphorus ranged from 7.2 to 15.5 micrograms per liter.

Mugser Run received a visual assessment in the fall of 2007, and was given scores on a scale of 0 to 28, with higher scores indicating higher quality. The scores of Mugser Run ranged from 19 to 20.

Agriculture significantly influences the chemical hydrology of Mugser Run.

== Geology ==
Mugser Run is located entirely within the ridge and valley physiographic province.

The most significant rock formations in the Mugser Run watershed are the Trimmers Rock Formation and the Catskill Formation–Buddys Run, which both occur in 35% of the watershed. The Catskill Formation–Irish Valley formation is the next-most prevalent formation, occurring in 20% of the watershed. The Hamilton Group and the Spechty Kopf Formation occupy 6% and 4% of the watershed, respectively.

The Berks-Weikert-Bedington soil series is the most prevalent soil series in the Mugser Run watershed, occupying 34% of the watershed. The Leck Kill-Meckesville-Calvin soil series and the Hazleton-Dekalb-Buchanan soil series both occupy 33% of the watershed.

Mugser Run has an elevation of 610 feet (190 m) above sea level.

== History ==
The Johnson Covered Bridge No. 28 crosses Mugser Run. It was built by Daniel Stine for $799. Adam M. Johnson owned a shoe store on the creek near the Johnson Covered Bridge No. 28.

== Biology ==
Mugser Run is a trout stream. Its headwaters are considered Class A Wild Trout Waters. In 1985, it was stocked with brown trout and rainbow trout. The concentration of brown trout in the creek ranges from about 76 to 78 kilograms per hectare. The fish range from 0.25 centimeters to 39.9 centimeters.

At one site on Mugser Run (named MURU1 at 40.854461, -76.443677), 19 species of microinvertebrates have been observed. Three are considered abundant, one is considered common, six are considered present, and nine are considered rare. At another site (named MURU2), 21 species of microinvertebrates have been observed. Three are considered abundant, two are considered common, six are considered present, and ten are considered rare. At a third site (named MURU3 at 40.877083, -76.495773), 24 taxa have been observed. Two are considered abundant, two are considered common, ten are considered present, and ten are considered rare.

The canopy coverage of Mugser Run ranges from 50% to 85%. The concentration of chlorophyll ranges from 2.00 to 2.66 micrograms per cubic centimeter.
