= Johnson Covered Bridge No. 28 =

- U.S. National Register of Historic Places
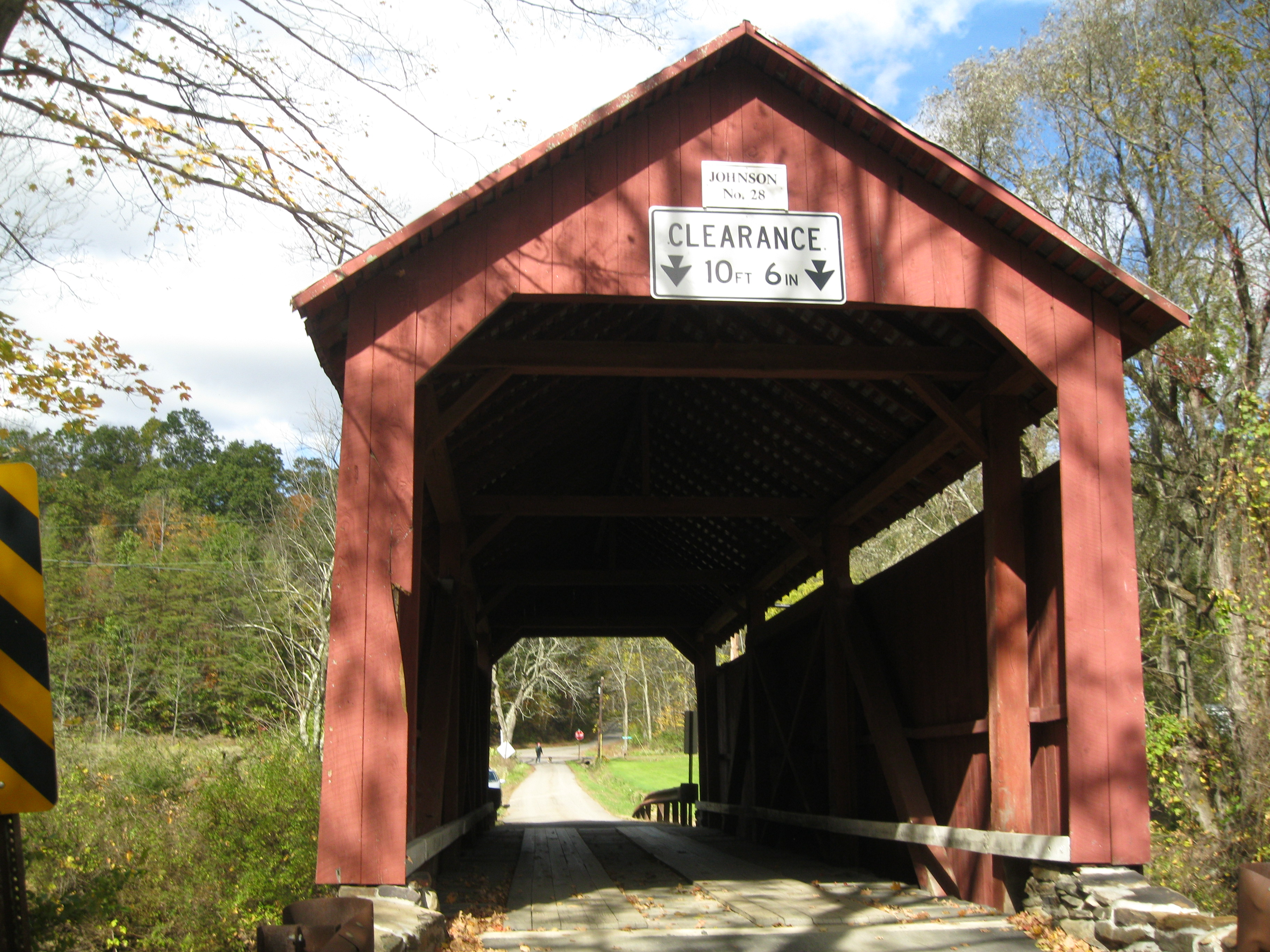
- The bridge in October 2012

- Location within Pennsylvania Location within the United States
- Location: Pennsylvania Route 320, south of Catawissa, Cleveland Township, Pennsylvania
- Coordinates: 40°52′40″N 76°29′2″W
- Area: 0.1 acres (0.040 ha)
- Built: 1882
- Built by: Daniel Stine
- Architectural style: Warren Truss
- MPS: Covered Bridges of Columbia and Montour Counties TR
- NRHP reference No.: 79003185
- Added to NRHP: November 29, 1979

The Johnson Covered Bridge No. 28 is an historic, wooden covered bridge in Cleveland Township in Columbia County, Pennsylvania, United States.

It was listed on the National Register of Historic Places in 1979.

== History and architectural features ==
It is a 60.8-foot-long (18.5 m), Warren Truss bridge with a metal roof. Erected in 1882, it crosses Mugser Run, and is one of twenty-eight historic covered bridges in Columbia and Montour Counties.
