= Snyder Covered Bridge No. 17 =

- U.S. National Register of Historic Places
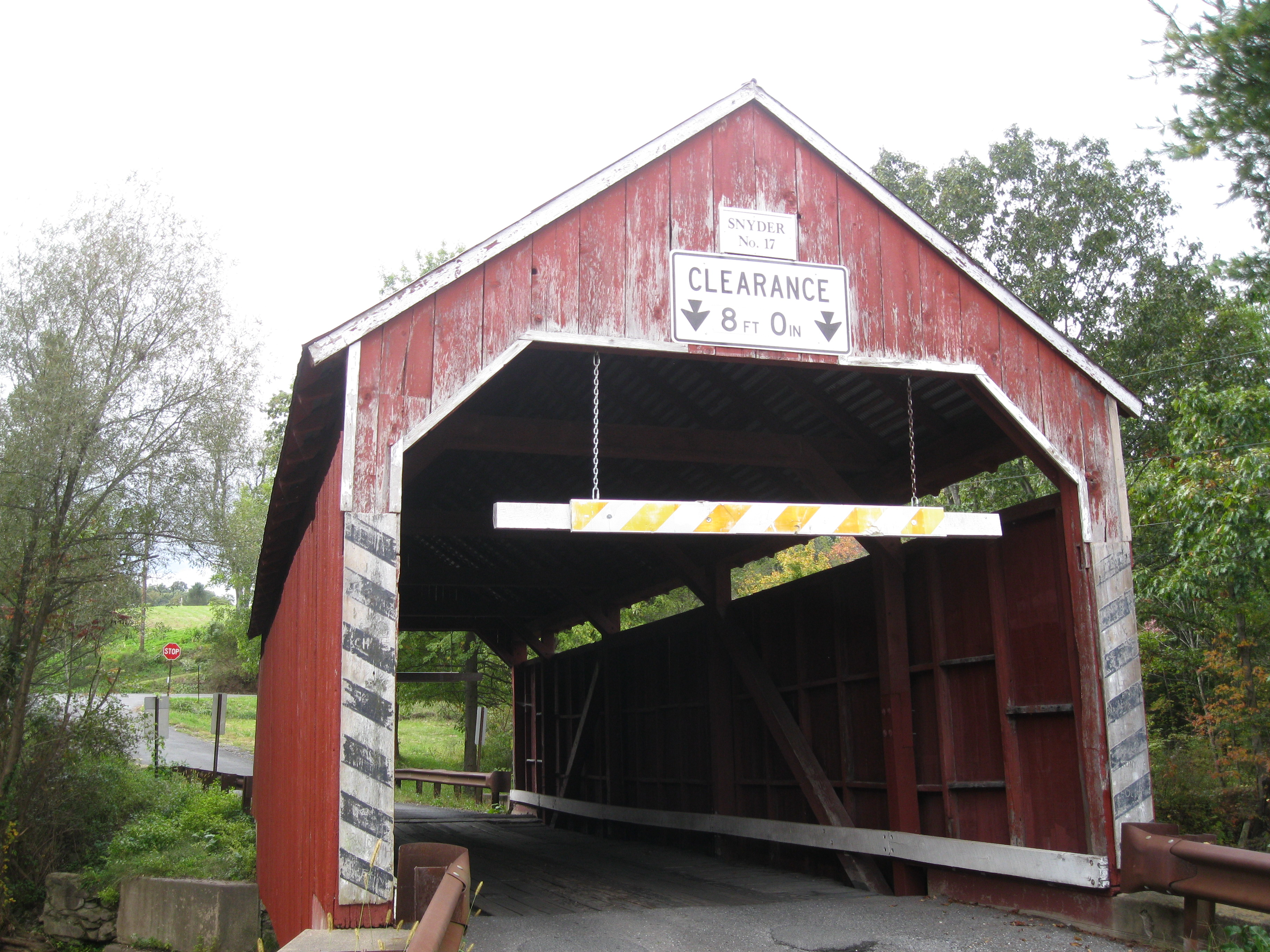
- The bridge in September 2012

- Location within Pennsylvania Location within the United States
- Location: Pennsylvania Route 361, southeast of Slabtown, Locust Township, Pennsylvania
- Coordinates: 40°54′05″N 76°23′40″W
- Area: 0.1 acres (0.040 ha)
- Built: 1860
- Architectural style: Queen Post
- MPS: Covered Bridges of Columbia and Montour Counties TR
- NRHP reference No.: 79003188
- Added to NRHP: November 29, 1979

The Snyder Covered Bridge No. 17 is a historic wooden covered bridge located at Locust Township in Columbia County, Pennsylvania. It is a 60.2-foot-long (18.3 m), Queen Post Truss bridge with a galvanized steel roof constructed in 1860. It crosses Roaring Creek. It is one of 28 historic covered bridges in Columbia and Montour Counties.

It was listed on the National Register of Historic Places in 1979.
