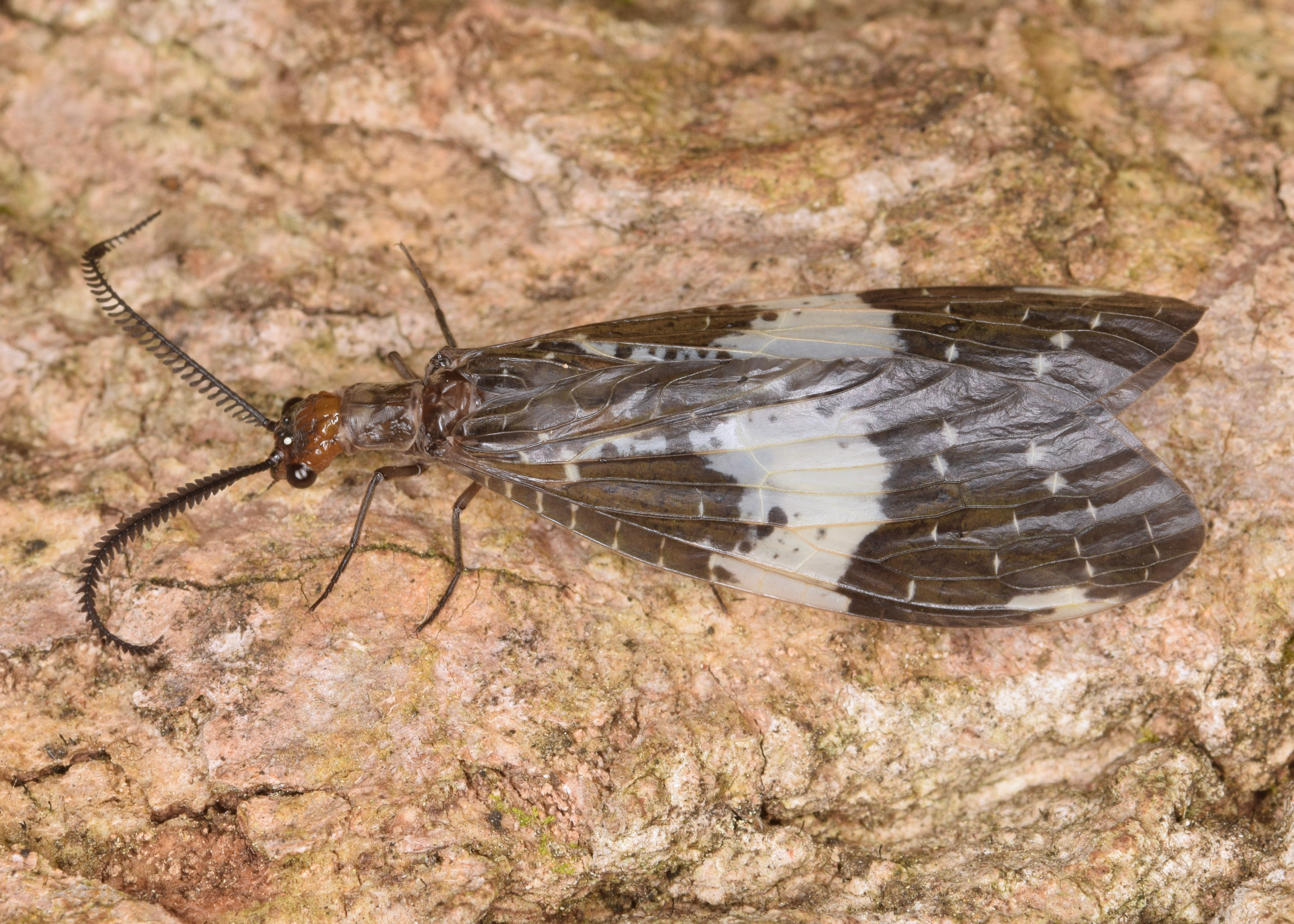

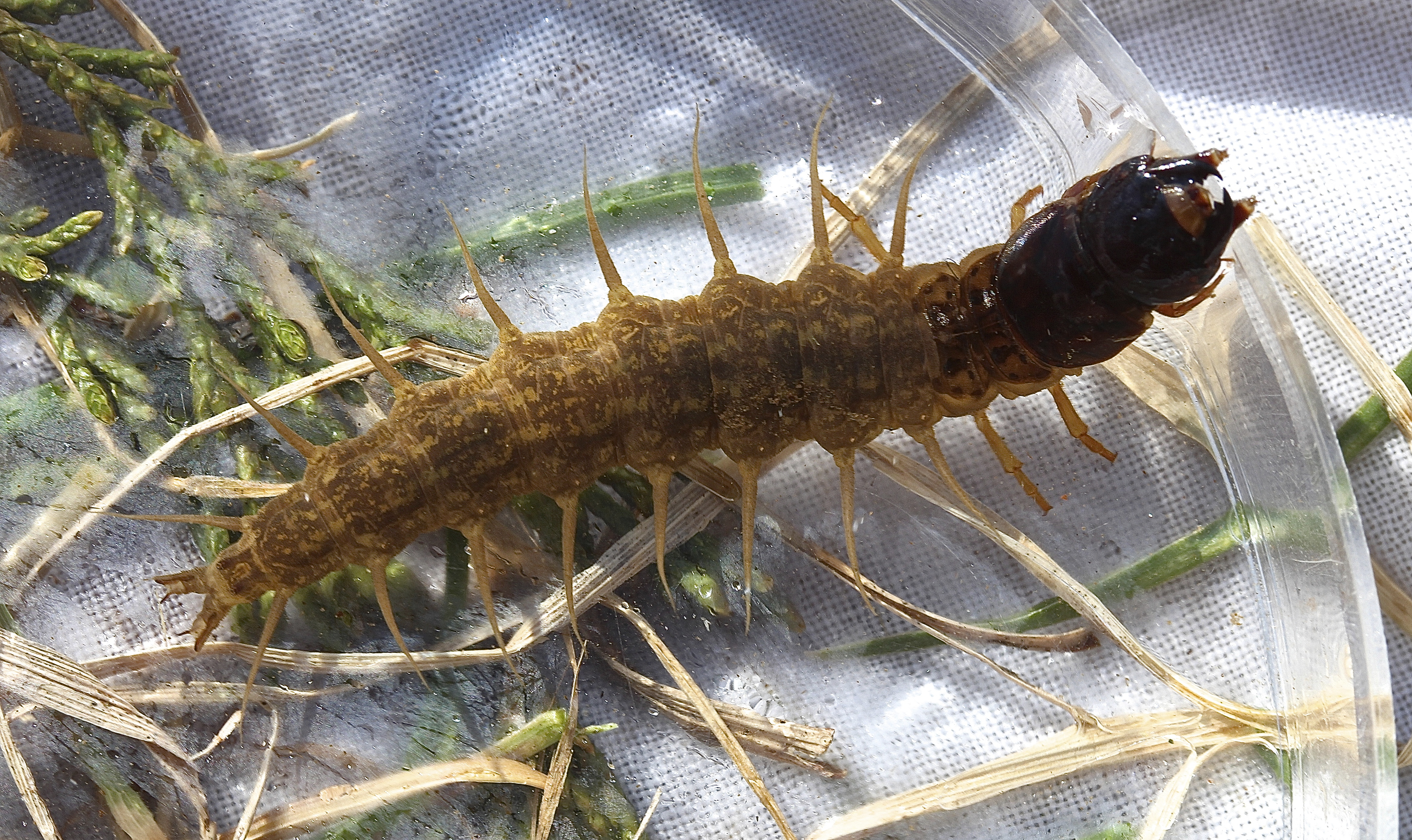
- Adult (top) and larva (bottom)

Scientific classification
- Kingdom: Animalia
- Phylum: Arthropoda
- Class: Insecta
- Order: Megaloptera
- Family: Corydalidae
- Genus: Nigronia
- Species: N. fasciata

Binomial name
- Nigronia fasciata (Walker, 1853)

= Nigronia fasciata =

Species of insect

Nigronia fasciata is a species of megalopterous dark fishfly in the Corydalidae family. The typical size of N. fasciata is 22 to 28 millimeters, or 2.2 to 2.8 centimeters. Range: Eastern United States. Note: not present in Canada.
