= Slabtown, Pennsylvania =

Unincorporated community in Pennsylvania, US

- Census-designated place
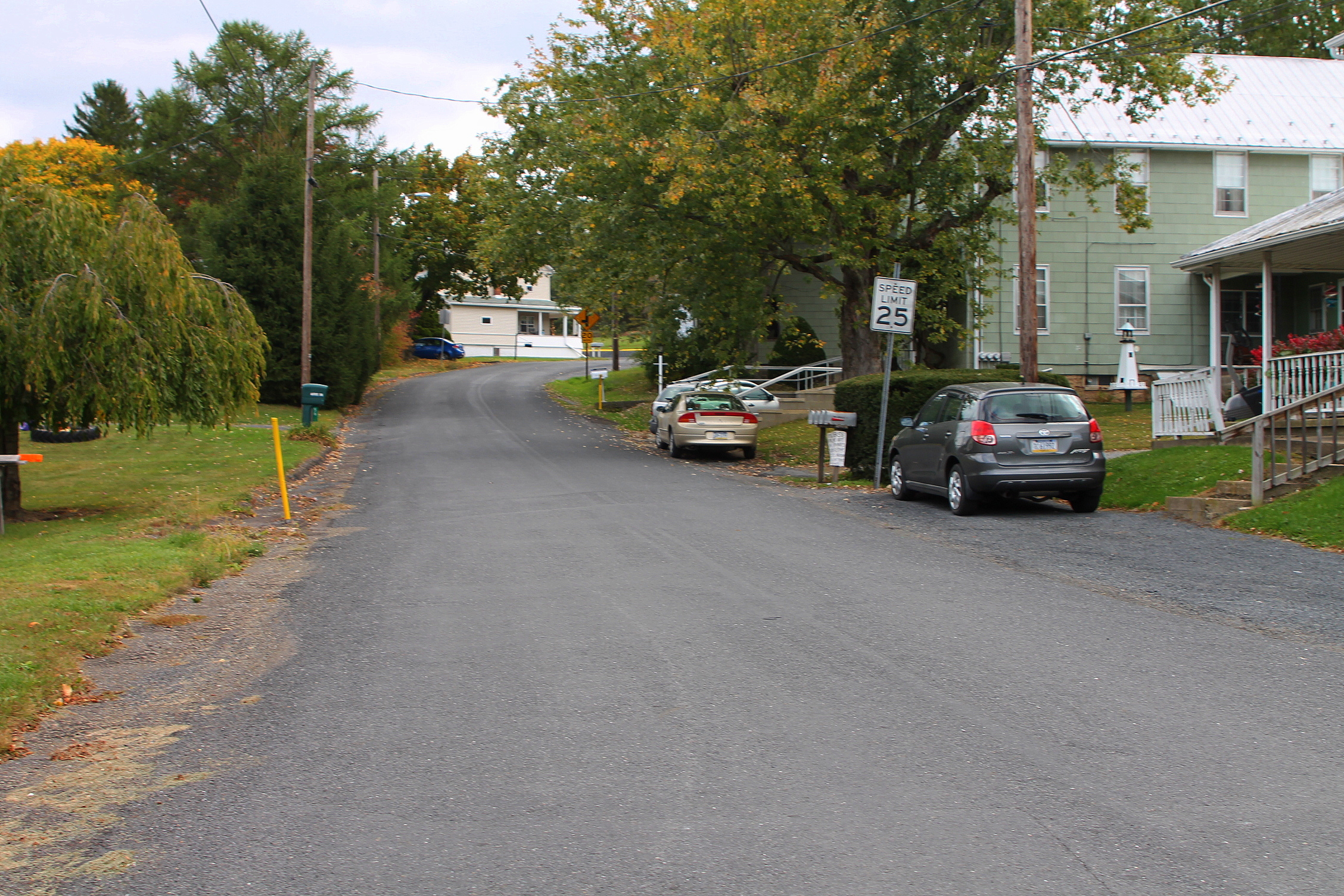
- Quaker Meeting House Road in Slabtown

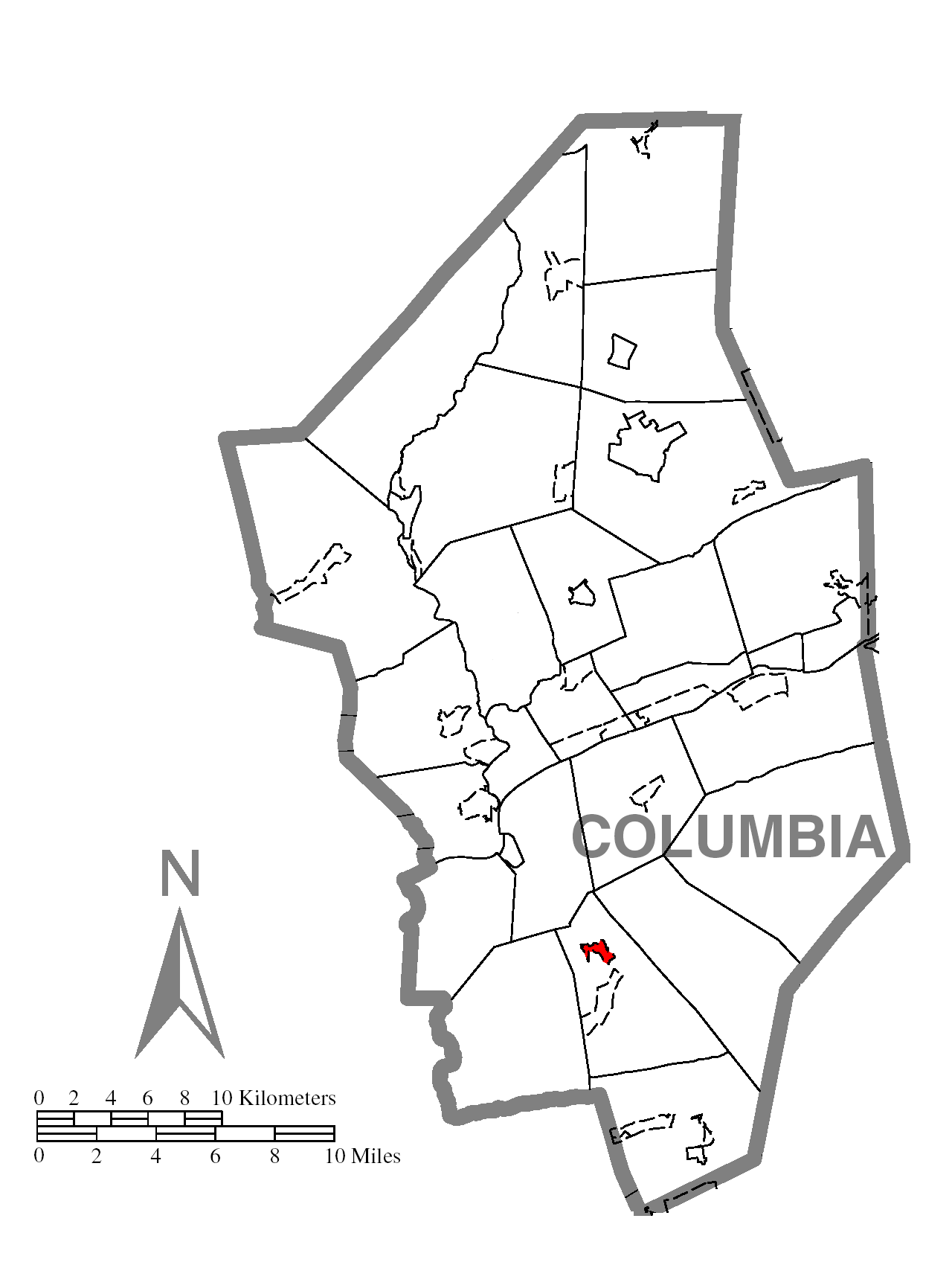
- Location within Columbia County

- Location within the U.S. state of Pennsylvania
- Coordinates: 40°54′18″N 76°24′31″W
- Country: United States
- State: Pennsylvania
- County: Columbia
- Township: Locust

Area
  - Total: 0.49 sq mi (1.27 km^{2})
  - Land: 0.47 sq mi (1.23 km^{2})
  - Water: 0.015 sq mi (0.04 km^{2})
- Elevation: 800 ft (240 m)

Population (2020)
  - Total: 145
  - Density: 327/sq mi (126.3/km^{2})
- Time zone: UTC-5 (Eastern (EST))
  - Summer (DST): UTC-4 (EDT)
- FIPS code: 42-71056
- GNIS feature ID: 1187777

Slabtown is a census-designated place in Columbia County, Pennsylvania, United States. It is part of Northeastern Pennsylvania. The population was 145 at the 2020 census. It is part of the Bloomsburg-Berwick micropolitan area.

== Geography ==
Slabtown is located in southern Columbia County at 40°54′22″N 76°24′31″W (40.905987, -76.408734), in the northern part of Locust Township. It is in the valley of Roaring Creek, a westward-flowing tributary of the Susquehanna River.

Slabtown is served by Pennsylvania Route 42, which leads north 9 miles (14 km) to Bloomsburg, the county seat, and south over several mountains 12 miles (19 km) to Ashland. According to the United States Census Bureau, the Slabtown CDP has a total area of 0.49 square miles (1.27 km^{2}), of which 0.47 square miles (1.23 km^{2}) is land and 0.02 square miles (0.04 km^{2}), or 2.86%, is water.

Slabtown has hills in the south and east and is flat in the north and west. The land in the CDP is mostly agricultural, with some forest.

== Demographics ==
As of the census of 2000, there were 105 people, 44 households, and 31 families residing in the CDP. The population density was 288.3 inhabitants per square mile (111.3/km^{2}). There were 65 housing units at an average density of 178.5 per square mile (68.9/km^{2}). The racial makeup of the CDP was 100.00% White.

There were 44 households, out of which 20.5% had children under the age of 18 living with them, 65.9% were married couples living together, 2.3% had a female householder with no husband present, and 27.3% were non-families. 22.7% of all households were made up of individuals, and 9.1% had someone living alone who was 65 years of age or older. The average household size was 2.36 and the average family size was 2.72.

In the CDP, the population was spread out, with 18.1% under the age of 18, 9.5% from 18 to 24, 30.5% from 25 to 44, 20.0% from 45 to 64, and 21.9% who were 65 years of age or older. The median age was 42 years. For every 100 females, there were 98.1 males. For every 100 females age 18 and over, there were 95.5 males.

The median income for a household in the CDP was $32,292, and the median income for a family was $39,583. Males had a median income of $35,625 versus $16,250 for females. The per capita income for the CDP was $16,384. There were no families and 2.9% of the population living below the poverty line, including no under eighteens and none of those over 64.

== Education ==
The school district is the Southern Columbia Area School District.
