= Roaring Creek (Pennsylvania) =

Tributary of the Susquehanna River

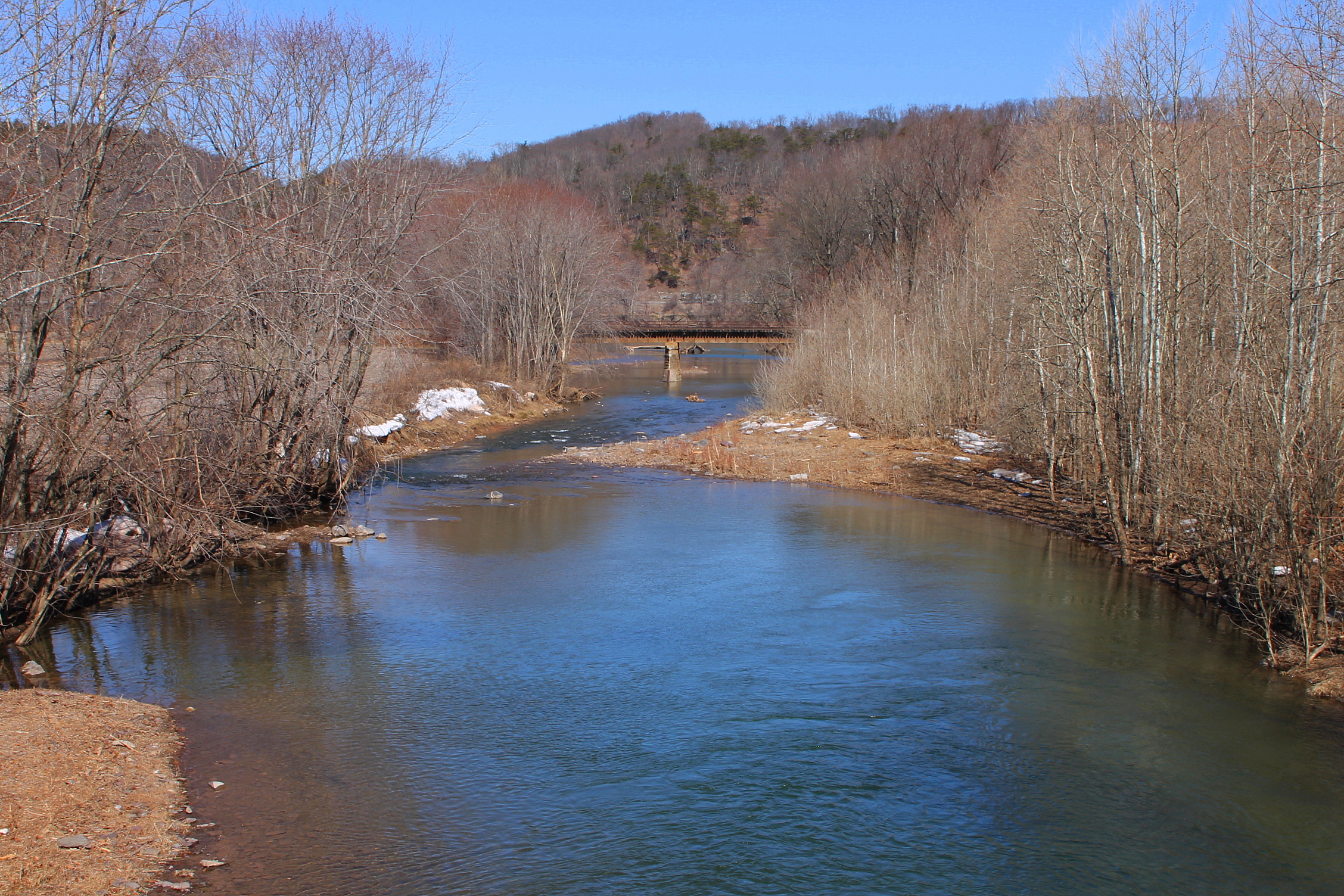
- Roaring Creek looking downstream near its mouth
- Etymology: direct translation of its native name, Popemetang, which references the rapids and waterfalls on the creek
- Native name: Popemetang (Unami)

Physical characteristics
- Source
  - location: Catawissa Mountain in Roaring Creek Township, Columbia County, Pennsylvania
  - elevation: between 1,660 and 1,680 feet (510 and 510 m)
- Mouth
  - location: Susquehanna River on the border between Mayberry Township, Montour County, Pennsylvania and Franklin Township, Columbia County, Pennsylvania
  - coordinates: 40°56′22″N 76°31′44″W
  - elevation: 453 ft (138 m)
- Length: 20 mi (32 km)
- Basin size: 87.3 mi^{2} (226 km^{2})

Basin features
- Progression: Susquehanna River → Chesapeake Bay
- Tributaries
  - left: Lick Run, South Branch Roaring Creek
  - right: Mill Creek

Roaring Creek is a tributary of the Susquehanna River in Columbia County and Montour County, in Pennsylvania, in the United States. It is slightly more than 20 miles (32 km) long and flows through Roaring Creek Township, Locust Township, Catawissa Township, Cleveland Township, and Franklin Township in Columbia County and Mayberry Township in Montour County. The watershed of the creek has an area of 87.3 square miles (226 km^{2}). It has three named tributaries: South Branch Roaring Creek, Lick Run, and Mill Creek. The creek is not considered to be impaired and is not affected by coal mining. However, its watershed has been impacted by human land use. Claystones, conglomerates, sandstones, siltstones, and shales all occur within the watershed. The creek flows through a gorge in its lower reaches, along the border between Columbia County and Montour County.

Most of the watershed of Roaring Creek is in Columbia County, but small areas are in Montour County, Northumberland County, and Schuylkill County. More than 40 percent of the watershed is forested and nearly 40 percent is agricultural land. State game lands and state forests are also in the watershed. A total of approximately 3,500 people inhabit the watershed, as of 2000. The creek's drainage basin is a High-Quality Coldwater Fishery and a Migratory Fishery upstream of Lick Run. Downstream of Lick Run, the main stem is a Trout Stocked Fishery and Migratory Fishery. A reach of the creek above Lick Run is designated as Class A Wild Trout Waters. 31 species of fish were observed at 20 sites in the watershed in 2003 and 2004.

Roaring Creek was historically known as Popemetang, but it was known as Roaring Creek by the late 1700s. Settlers such as Quakers first arrived in the area in the 1770s. In the 19th century, various mills and furnaces were constructed on the creek and several bridges were constructed. Agriculture was also a major industry in the watershed in the early 20th century. More bridges were constructed across the creek in the 20th century. The Roaring Creek Valley Conservation Association formed in February 2006. Part of the creek is navigable by canoe.

== Course ==
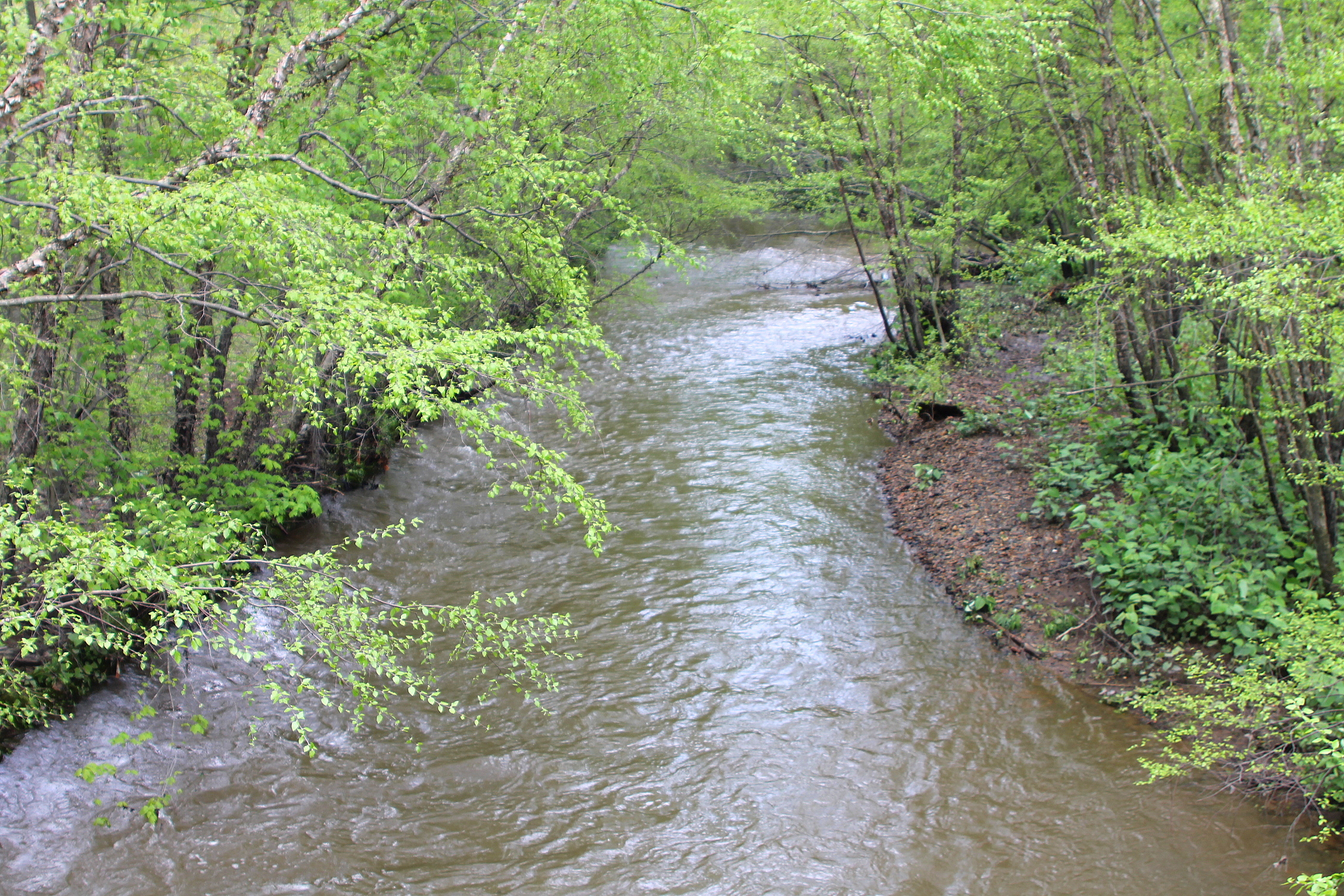
Roaring Creek in springtime

Roaring Creek begins on Catawissa Mountain in Roaring Creek Township, Columbia County. It flows west-southwest for a short distance before turning south for a few tenths of a mile. It then turns west for a few miles and flows off Catawissa Mountain before eventually crossing State Route 2003, passing Mill Grove, and entering Locust Township. The creek turns north-northwest for a few tenths of a mile and reenters Roaring Creek Township before turning west and reentering Locust Township. It then flows west-northwest for more than a mile and receives Mill Creek, its first named tributary, from the right, as well as receiving the tributary Lick Run from the left. The creek then turns northwest for more than a mile and enters Slabtown before turning west for several tenths of a mile and crossing Pennsylvania Route 42. After this, it turns northwest for several tenths of a mile before meandering west-southwest for a few miles, passing Queen City, Parrs Mill, and a lake known as Lake Glory. In this stretch, the creek leaves Locust Township and crosses the border between Catawissa Township and Cleveland Township three or four times before entering Franklin Township. Near Pennsyl's Mill, The creek then meanders northwest for a few miles, crossing Pennsylvania Route 487 and receiving South Branch Roaring Creek, its least named tributary, from the left. Upon reaching the Montour County line, the creek turns north for a few miles, flowing along the border between Franklin Township, Columbia County and Mayberry Township, Montour County. In this reach, it passes through a gorge with Sharp Ridge on the west. After a few miles, the creek leaves the gorge and crosses State Route 3012. A few tenths of a mile further downstream, it reaches its confluence with the Susquehanna River.

Roaring Creek joins the Susquehanna River 142.36 miles (229.11 km) upriver of its mouth.

=== Tributaries ===
Roaring Creek has three named tributaries: South Branch Roaring Creek, Lick Run, and Mill Creek. South Branch Roaring Creek joins Roaring Creek 4.28 miles (6.89 km) upstream of its mouth. Its watershed has an area of 35.9 square miles (93 km^{2}). Lick Run joins Roaring Creek 14.08 miles (22.66 km) upstream of its mouth. Its watershed has an area of 5.97 square miles (15.5 km^{2}). Mill Creek joins Roaring Creek 15.02 miles (24.17 km) upstream of its mouth. Its watershed has an area of 4.98 square miles (12.9 km^{2}).

== Hydrology ==
The concentration of alkalinity in Roaring Creek upstream of Lick Run is 9 milligrams per liter. Many nearby watersheds have been rendered nearly devoid of aquatic life due to acid mine drainage caused by coal mining. However, Roaring Creek has not been affected by this, although it has been still impacted by human land use. Sedimentation, siltation, and agricultural impacts occur in the watershed. The only impaired stream in the watershed is a small unnamed tributary that is impaired by siltation. From a chemical standpoint, Roaring Creek is infertile.

The specific conductance of Roraing Creek ranges from 11 micro-siemens per centimeter at site 2 to 127 micro-siemens per centimeter at site 4. In 2003 and 2004, the pH of the creek ranged from 7.0 to 7.2. In a later survey, it was found to be acidic at sites 1 and 2 (6.50 and 6.89, respectively), but alkaline at sites 3 and 4 (7.34 and 8.27, respectively). The concentration of alkalinity in the creek ranges from 5.1 milligrams per liter at site 1 to 32 milligrams per liter at site 2. The concentration of water hardness ranges from 28 milligrams per liter at river mile 4.04 to 44 milligrams per liter at river mile 8.54. The discharge of the creek is 12.2 liters per second at site 1, 243.5 liters per second at site 2, 216.7 liters per second at site 3, and 271.6 liters per second at site 4.

The concentration of nitrogen in Roaring Creek ranges from 956.5 micrograms per liter at site 1 to 2343.1 micrograms per liter at site 2. The phosphorus concentration ranges from 12.6 micrograms per liter at site 1 to 28.6 micrograms per liter at site 2.

== Geography, geology, and climate ==
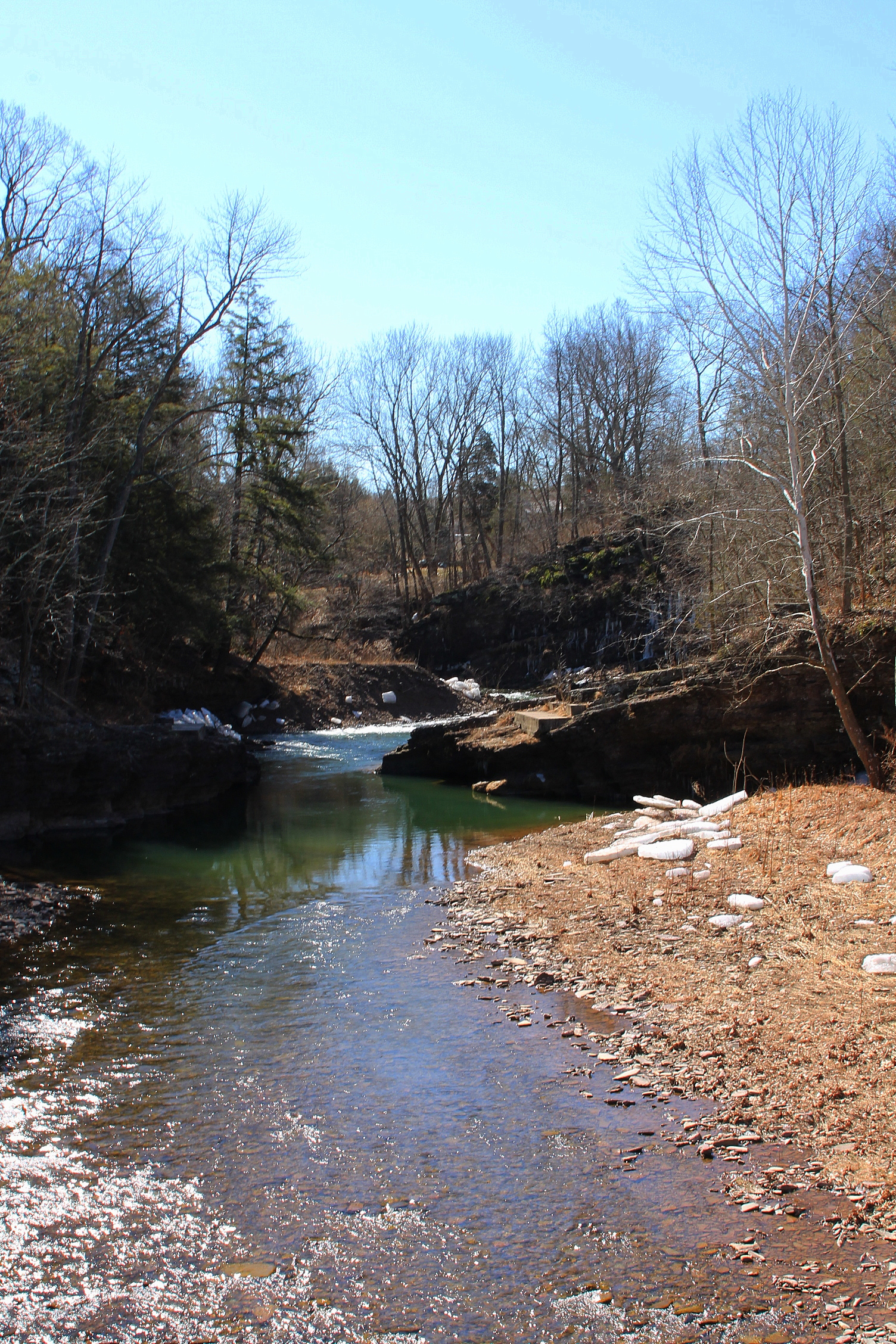
Roaring Creek near the lower end of its gorge

The elevation near the mouth of Roaring Creek is 453 feet (138 m) above sea level. The elevation of the creek's source is between 1,660 and 1,680 feet (510 and 510 m) above sea level. From 1,100 to 700 feet (340 to 210 m) above sea level, the gradient of the creek is 57.1 feet per mile. From 700 feet (210 m) above sea level to its mouth, the gradient is 25.7 feet per mile.

The topography at the headwaters of Roaring Creek is mountainous. However, much of the watershed is rough and hilly and the creek flows through a valley surrounded by broken hills. It flows through a narrow gorge for its last 3 miles (4.8 km). The creek's channel is sinuous. There are cobbly and rocky rapids on some reaches of the creek. In the gorge, the creek flows past cliffs and over ledges and waterfalls. A set of wet limestone ledges known as the Roaring Creek Bluffs are located along the creek in Franklin Township and Montour County. Power lines also cross the creek in this reach. Some strainers occur on the creek upstream of State Route 3012. A ridge known as Sharp Ridge is located near the creek.

Roaring Creek is located in the ridge and valley physiographic province. A dividing ridge separates the creek from the Susquehanna River. One reach of the creek is a mid-sized coldwater stream. Another reach is a large freestone stream. Roaring Creek flows through rock formations consisting of sandstone and shale. Rocks in the watershed include claystones, conglomerates, sandstones, siltstones, and shales from the Devonian and Mississippian. Outcroppings of calcareous beds, limestones, and marine fossils occur in the watershed as well. Some mineable coal is present in the watershed of South Branch Roaring Creek. The Genesee beds appear along the creek and are the lowest beds that are visible above the water line. To the east, they are covered by Chemung beds. A soil known as the Albrights Series is found along the creek. It is a reddish-brown soil that is slightly poorly or moderately well drained and is made from glaciated red shale and sandstone.

Roaring Creek has a 100 year floodplain. The average annual rate of precipitation in the watershed of Roaring Creek ranges from 35 to 50 inches (89 to 127 cm). In July 2003 and June 2004, the water temperature of the creek was found to range from 14.7 °C (58.5 °F) at river mile 10.98 to 19.4 °C (66.9 °F) at river mile 6.02. The air temperature near the creek ranged from 17.0 °C (62.6 °F) at river mile 8.54 to 30.0 °C (86.0 °F) at river mile 6.02.

== Watershed ==
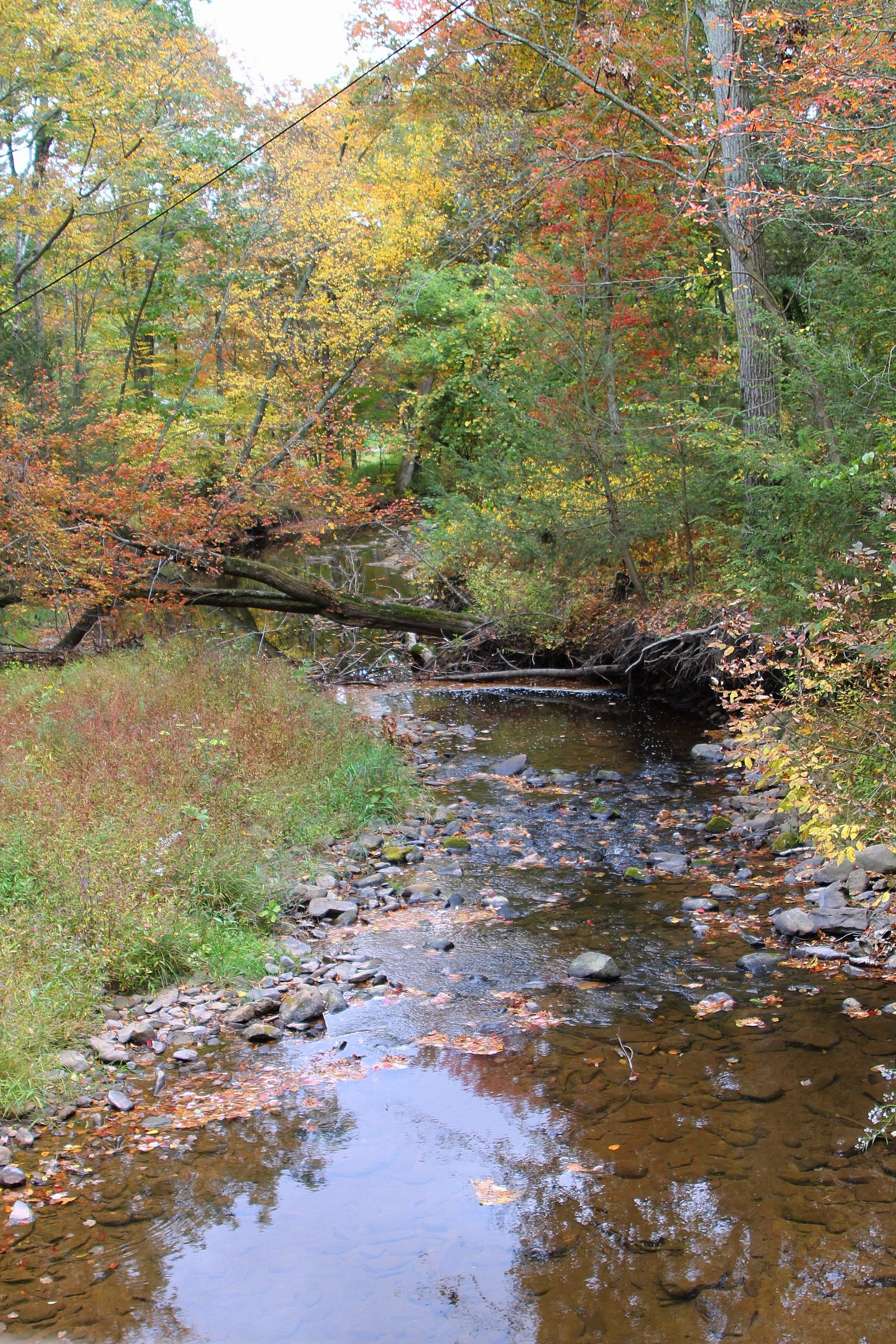
Roaring Creek in its upper reaches

The watershed of Roaring Creek has an area of 87.3 square miles (226 km^{2}). The watershed occupies parts of Columbia County, Montour County, Northumberland County, and Schuylkill County. Most of the watershed is in Columbia County and smaller areas are in Montour County and Northumberland County. Only a very small area in its upper reaches is in Schuylkill County. The watershed is in the Lower North Branch Susquehanna drainage basin. The creek's mouth is in the United States Geological Survey quadrangle of Danville. However, its source is in the quadrangle of Shumans. The creek also passes through the quadrangle of Catawissa. Other quadrangles that the watershed is in include Shamokin, Ashland, and Mount Carmel. The creek flows in a generally northwesterly direction and serves as the border between Montour County and Columbia County in its last 2 miles (3.2 km). Roaring Creek is one of three major streams draining the southern part of Columbia County.

More than 40 percent of the watershed of Roaring Creek is on forested land, including evergreen and deciduous forests, as well as mixed forests. A significant portion of the forested land in the watershed is a 9,000 acres (3,600 ha) tract of land along South Branch Roaring Creek. This tract was acquired by the Pennsylvania Department of Conservation and Natural Resources in 2003. A large tract of forested land on a ridge running from Moosic to the Susquehanna River passes through the watershed of Roaring Creek. State forest land occurs along the southern edge of the watershed and Pennsylvania State Game Lands (Pennsylvania State Game Lands Number 58) occur along the eastern edge. Nearly 40 percent of the watershed is on agricultural land. This land use occurs in the creek's valley, as does open space.

Upstream of Lick Run, 13 percent of Roaring Creek is on public land that is open to access. The remaining 87 percent is on private land that is closed to access. The remaining reaches of the creek are entirely on private land, but open to access. As of 2000, approximately 3,500 people live in the watershed. In section 01, the population density of the watershed is 18 people per square kilometer as of 2000. In section 02, the population density is 22 people per square kilometer and in section 03, the population density is 16 people per square kilometer. In section 01 of the creek, 50 percent of its length is within 100 meters of a road, 89 percent is within 300 meters, and 91 percent is within 500 meters. In section 02, 28 percent is within 100 meters, 87 percent is within 300 meters, and 100 percent is within 500 meters. In section 03, 96 percent of its length is within 100 meters of a road, 98 percent is within 300 meters of one, and 100 percent is within 500 meters of one. The creek flows through a remote-seeming farm valley for a substantial part of its length. Major roads in or near the watershed include Pennsylvania Route 487, Pennsylvania Route 54, and Pennsylvania Route 42.

Visual assessment of Roaring Creek was carried out by Roaring Creek Valley Conservation Association volunteers at four locations in October and November 2007. The scores ranged from 15.5 out of 28 (55 percent; the lowest value in the entire watershed) to 23 out of 28 (82 percent).

== History and etymology ==
Roaring Creek was entered into the Geographic Names Information System on August 2, 1979. Its identifier in the Geographic Names Information System is 1185166.

Roaring Creek was known to the Lenni Lenape as Popemetang, which means "Roaring Creek" in English. This name likely originates from the waterfalls and rapids on the creek's lower reaches. The creek was known as Popemetang until the late 1700s. However, several maps were referring to it as Roaring Creek as early as 1792. Its name appears as Roaring Creek in even the earliest survey warrants in the area.

The Centre Turnpike was constructed in 1770 and provided access to the valley of Roaring Creek, roughly following the current course of Pennsylvania Route 487 and Pennsylvania Route 54. The Reading Road was later constructed in the watershed and ran in a southeasterly direction. Quakers were living in the valley of the creek by the 1770s and land on the creek was patented to Samuel Shakespeare in 1773. A number of settlers arrived in the valley from the Philadelphia area via the Reading Road. Soon after the end of the American Revolutionary War, farms were appearing along the creek's banks.

The second-oldest mill in what is now Columbia County was built in a gorge on Roaring Creek, near its mouth, in the 1780s. This mill was known as the Cleaver Mill. A second mill, which was similar to the first, was later constructed at the site. John Hauch constructed a furnace on the creek in 1816. It was the first furnace in the area. The first iron furnace in Montour County was built near the creek's mouth in 1839 or 1840. The furnace was known as the Roaring Creek Anthracite Water Power Furnace. It was altered in 1854. In 1856, the furnace produced 2350 tons of iron from ore on Montour Ridge, despite low water. The only post office in Mayberry Township up to 1915 was built at the mouth of the creek in 1895. It was known as Howelsville, after W.B. Howell, its first postmaster.

In the early 1900s, major industries in the watershed of Roaring Creek included agriculture. However, the creek was also used as water power for a small gristmill. During this time period, major communities in the watershed included Roaring Creek and Bear Gap. Their populations were 407 and 124, respectively. In the early 1900s, the only major industries in Franklin Township were gristmills on the creek on the border between it and Cleveland Township. There were historically proposals to use the creek as a water supply for Danville, transferring the water via pipes under the Susquehanna River. Andrew Trone once constructed a hotel on the creek.

Many bridges have been constructed across Roaring Creek and a number of covered bridges can be seen from the creek. The first bridge over the creek was constructed in 1874 at Slabtown for a cost of $1500. It was replaced in 1913 for a cost of $5500. The Davis Covered Bridge was built northwest of Slabtown in 1875 and repaired in 1997. It is 86.9 feet (26.5 m) long and is listed on the National Register of Historic Places. The Snyder Covered Bridge No. 17 was built over the creek southeast of Slabtown in 1876 and repaired in 2010. It is 60.0 feet (18.3 m) long and is also on the National Register of Historic Places. The two-span Esther Furnace Covered Bridge was built over the creek in Cleveland Township in 1905. It is 95.1 feet (29.0 m) long and is listed on the National Register of Historic Places.

A steel stringer/multi-beam or girder bridge carrying State Route 2012 was constructed over Roaring Creek in 1908 and repaired in 1996. It is 27.9 feet (8.5 m) long and is situated east of Mill Grove. A concrete tee beam bridge was built over the creek in 1940 north of Aristes. This bridge is 33.1 feet (10.1 m) long and carries Pennsylvania Route 42. A two-span steel stringer/multi-beam or girder bridge carrying State Route 3003 was constructed across the creek southwest of Catawissa in 1950 and repaired in 2011. This bridge is 86.0 feet (26.2 m) long. Two bridges of the same type (but with only one span) were constructed over the creek in Slabtown and Mill Grove in 1956, carrying Creek Road and State Route 2001. Their lengths are 64.0 feet (19.5 m) and 46.9 feet (14.3 m); the first was repaired in 2011. A prestressed box beam or girders bridge carrying Pennsylvania Route 42 over the creek was built in 1959 south of Catawissa. Its length is 68.9 feet (21.0 m) and it was repaired in 2010. A bridge of a similar type was built over the creek in 1964 for T314. It is 73.2 feet (22.3 m) long and is situated to the south of Catawissa. A prestressed stringer/multi-beam or girder bridge carrying State Route 3012 was built across the creek in 1966. It is west of Catawissa and is 64.0 feet (19.5 m) long. A prestressed box beam or girders bridge was built across the creek in 1974 south of Catawissa. It is 84.0 feet (25.6 m) long and carries Pennsylvania Route 487. A bridge of the same type, but carrying T468, was built over the creek in 1981. It is situated south of Mill Grove and has a length of 50.9 feet (15.5 m). A steel stringer/multi-beam or girder bridge carrying Mill Road was built over the creek in 1985 and repaired in 2012. This bridge is 34.1 feet (10.4 m) long and is situated southeast of Slabtown.

In 2003, Martin Friday assessed streams in the watershed of Roaring Creek at 37 locations, using the United States Environmental Protection Agency's rapid assessment protocol. In 2004, Robert Wnuk carried out fisheries surveys on every named stream in the watershed. The Roaring Creek Valley Conservation Association formed in February 2006 to conserve the natural and cultural resources of the Roaring Creek watershed.

== Biology ==
Upstream of the tributary Lick Run, the drainage basin of Roaring Creek is designated as a High-Quality Coldwater Fishery and a Migratory Fishery. From Lick Run downstream to its mouth, the main stem of the creek is a Trout-Stocking Fishery and a Migratory Fishery. Wild trout naturally reproduce in the creek from its headwaters downstream to 11,154 feet (3,400 m) upstream of its mouth, a distance of 18.15 miles (29.21 km). They also naturally reproduce throughout the entire length of every other named tributary of the creek. Roaring Creek is considered by the Pennsylvania Fish and Boat Commission to be Class A Wild Trout Waters for brown trout from its headwaters downstream to Lick Run, a distance of 6.1 miles (9.8 km).

In 2003 and 2004, 31 fish species were found at 20 sites in the watershed of Roaring Creek. Eastern blacknose dace are the most common fish species in the watershed and were observed at 85 percent of the sites. White suckers and brown trout occurred at 80 percent of the sites, longnose dace occurred at 70 percent of the sites, cutlips minnows occurred at 65 percent of the sites, and bluegills occurred at 60 percent of the sites. Fallfish, golden shiners, yellow bullheads, and American eels were all historically observed in the watershed, but were not found during the survey. However, redside dace, creek chubsuckers, green sunfish, and fathead minnows were observed in the watershed for the first time during the 2003/2004 survey. The most common game species was wild brown trout, although smaller numbers of brook trout were observed as well. Other game fish in the creek's drainage basin include rainbow trout. smallmouth bass, largemouth bass, and chain pickerel.

The biomass of wild brown trout in section 02 of Roaring Creek was estimated in the early 2000s to be 9.53 kilograms per hectare. There were an estimated 42 brown trout of legal size per kilometer of stream. This equates to an estimated 815 brown trout between 7 and 16 inches (18 and 41 cm) in length in that section. The trout in section 02 of the creek are up to approximately 400 millimetres (16 in) in length and some brown trout in the creek can reach lengths of up to 22 inches (56 cm).

Waterfowl have been known to inhabit the watershed of Roaring Creek.

Various macroinvertebrate taxa inhabit Roaring Creek. At one site, there is one abundant macroinvertebrate taxon, with 25 to 100 individuals being observed. At this site, there are five common taxa and five present taxa, with 10 to 25 and 3 to 9 individuals being observed, respectively. Eleven taxa are rare, with fewer than three individuals being observed. At another site, there are two abundant taxa, three common taxa, four present taxa, and eight rare taxa. At a third site on the creek, there are three abundant taxa, four common taxa, three present taxa, and seven rare taxa.

Hardwood trees and hemlocks occur on the slopes of the valley of Roaring Creek. Hemlocks also occur in the creek's gorge. The canopy coverage at four sites on the creek ranges from 0 percent to 75 percent. The algal biomass of the creek ranges from 0.01 to 1.21 in terms of chlorophyll a per square centimeter. The Roaring Creek Bluffs are listed on the Columbia County Natural Areas Inventory. Jeweled shooting-star, which is threatened in Pennsylvania, occurs at this site. Other plant species in this area include hydrangea, fragile fern, maidenhair spleenwort, golden saxifrage. However, several weedy plants also grow in the area.

== Recreation ==
It is possible to canoe on 13.0 miles (20.9 km) of Roaring Creek, from Slabtown to the mouth during fast snowmelt or within three days of heavy rain. The difficulty rating of the creek ranges from 1 to 2+. Edward Gertler's book Keystone Canoeing describes the scenery as being "fair to good". The book describes the creek itself as being "a small and easy-to-overlook wet weather stream". There are two painted canoe gauges on the creek, one at Pennsylvania Route 42 and the other at Pennsylvania Route 487.

Roaring Creek is one of the major fishing area in Columbia County. Knoebels Amusement Park is in the western part of the creek's watershed. In the 1990s, the creek was a candidate for Pennsylvania Scenic Rivers status.

== See also ==
- Little Roaring Creek, the next tributary of the Susquehanna River going downriver
- Catawissa Creek, the next tributary of the Susquehanna River going upriver
- List of rivers of Pennsylvania
