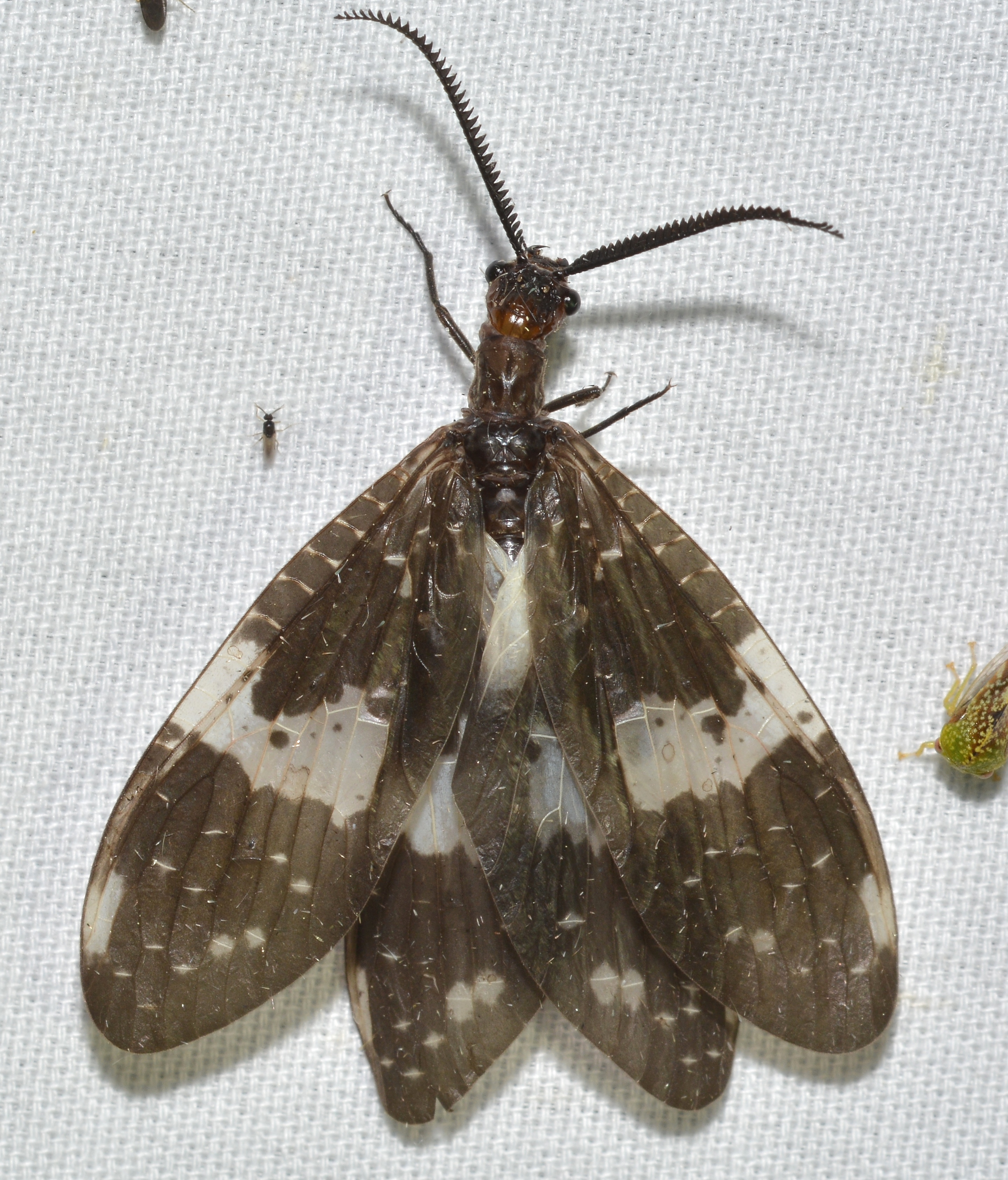
- Nigronia serricornis

Scientific classification
- Domain: Eukaryota
- Kingdom: Animalia
- Phylum: Arthropoda
- Class: Insecta
- Order: Megaloptera
- Family: Corydalidae
- Subfamily: Chauliodinae
- Genus: Nigronia; Banks, 1908

= Nigronia =

Genus of insects

Nigronia is a genus of megalopterous insects (dark fishflies) in the family of Corydalidae. The typical size of species in the Nigronia genus are 20-30 millimeters.

== Species ==
There are 2 species in the genus Nigronia; Nigronia serricornis and Nigronia fasciata. The main thing that distinguishes the two species is that Nigronia fasciata has continuous and large white areas on its wings, whereas Nigronia serricornis has white spots on its wings which are isolated, rather than large and continuous.
