= Locust Township, Columbia County, Pennsylvania =

Township in Pennsylvania, US

Coordinates: 40°53′00″N 76°22′59″W

Locust Township, Pennsylvania
- Township
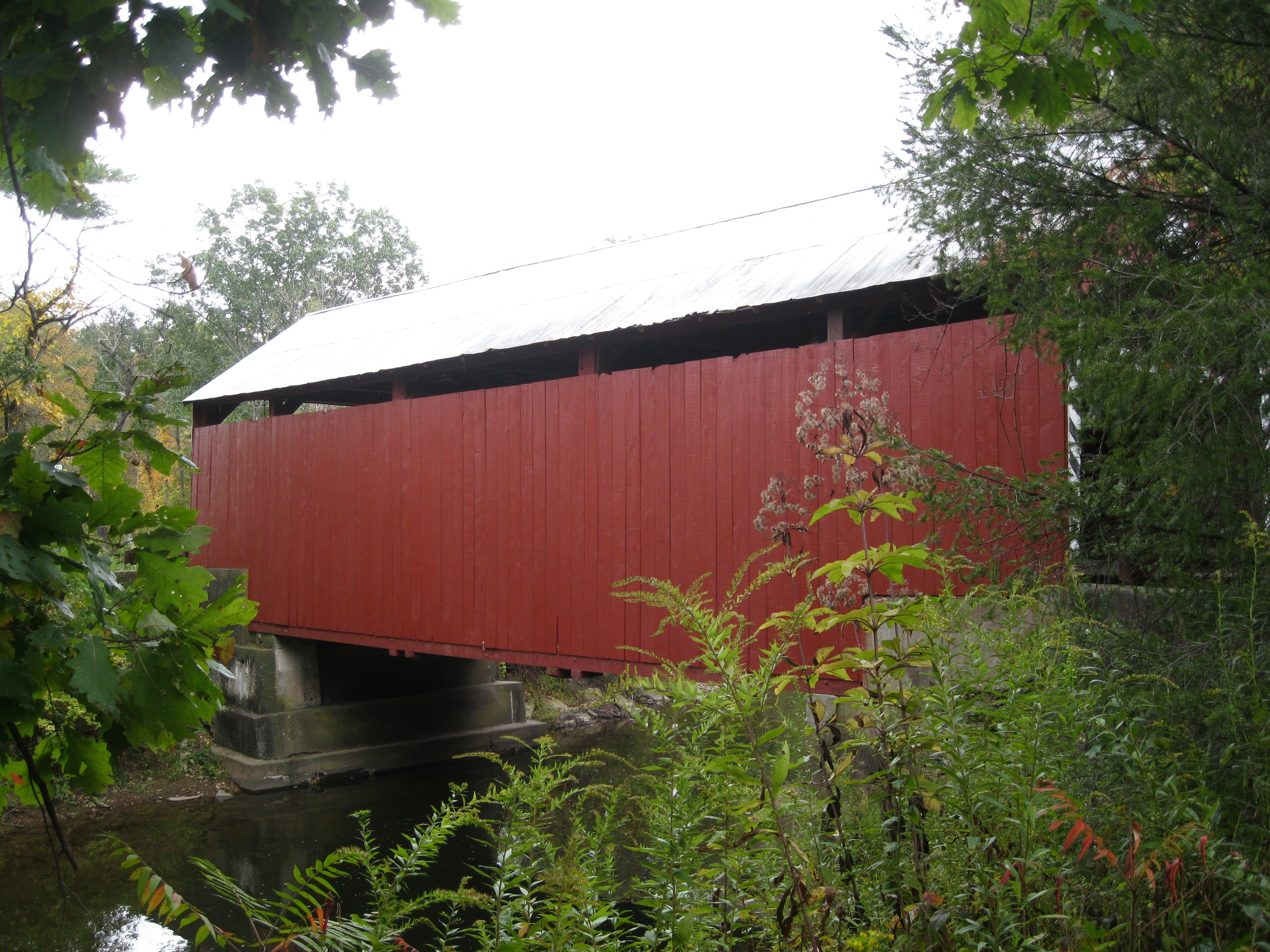
- Snyder Covered Bridge No. 17 crossing Roaring Creek in Locust Township

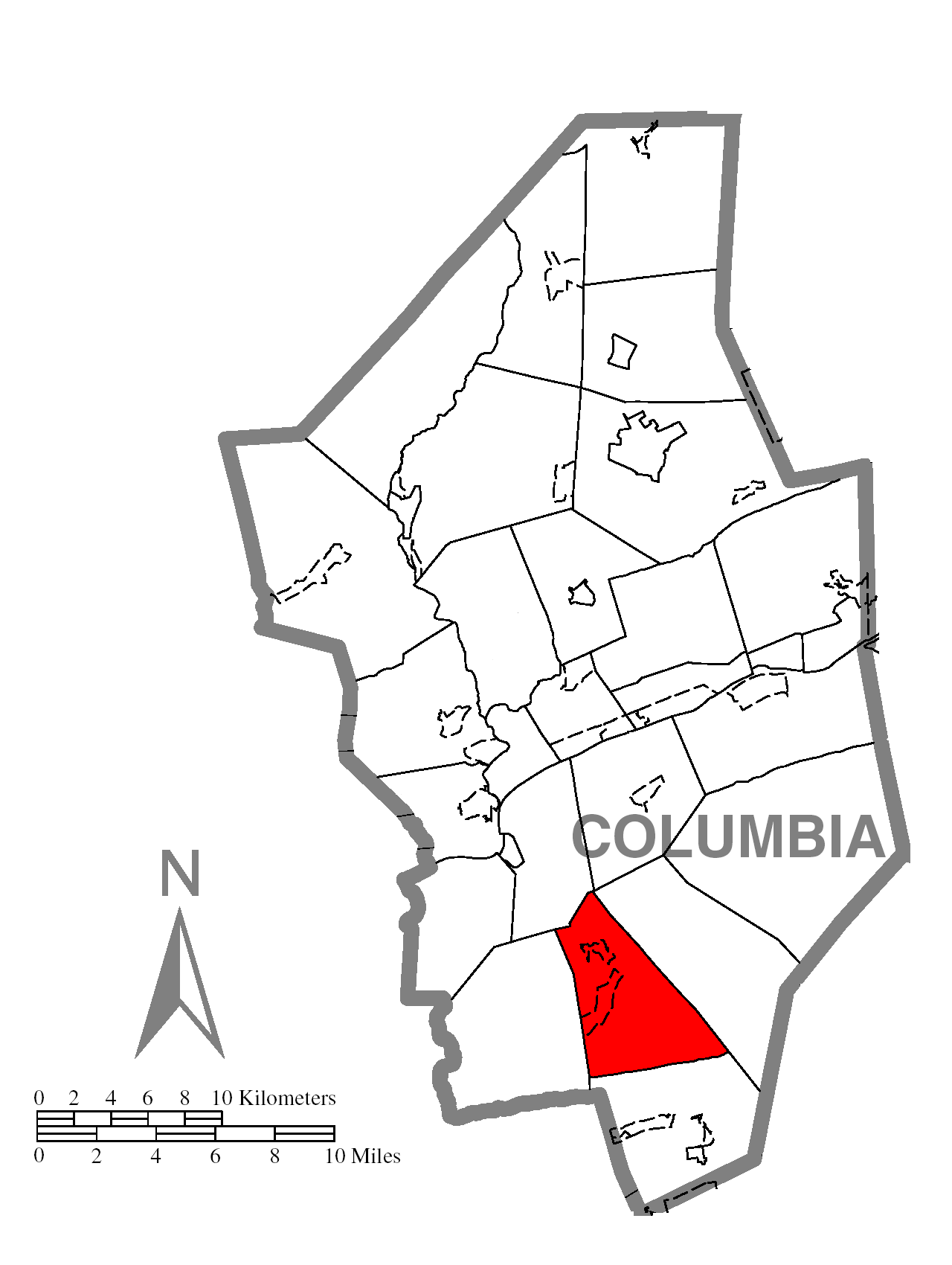
- Map of Columbia County, Pennsylvania highlighting Locust Township

- Map of Columbia County, Pennsylvania
- Country: United States
- State: Pennsylvania
- County: Columbia
- Settled: 1794
- Incorporated: 1853

Area
  - Total: 17.90 sq mi (46.36 km^{2})
  - Land: 17.79 sq mi (46.08 km^{2})
  - Water: 0.11 sq mi (0.28 km^{2})

Population (2020)
  - Total: 1,459 ▲
  - Estimate (2021): 1,463
  - Density: 78.8/sq mi (30.41/km^{2})
- Time zone: UTC-5 (Eastern (EST))
  - Summer (DST): UTC-4 (EDT)
- Area code: 570
- FIPS code: 42-037-44208

Locust Township is a township in Columbia County, Pennsylvania, United States. It is part of Northeastern Pennsylvania. The population was 1,459 at the time of the 2020 census.

== History ==
The Snyder Covered Bridge No. 17 and Wagner Covered Bridge No. 19 were listed on the National Register of Historic Places in 1979. The Roaring Creek Friends Meetinghouse near Numidia was built in 1796.

== Geography ==
Locust Township is in southern Columbia County and contains the unincorporated communities of Slabtown and Numidia. The southern boundary follows the crest of Little Mountain. According to the United States Census Bureau, the township has a total area of 17.9 square miles (46.4 km^{2}), of which 17.8 square miles (46.1 km^{2}) is land and 0.1 square miles (0.3 km^{2}), or 0.60%, is water.

== Demographics ==
Historical population
Census	Pop.	Note	%±
2010	1,404		—
2020	1,459		3.9%
2021 (est.)	1,463		0.3%
U.S. Decennial Census

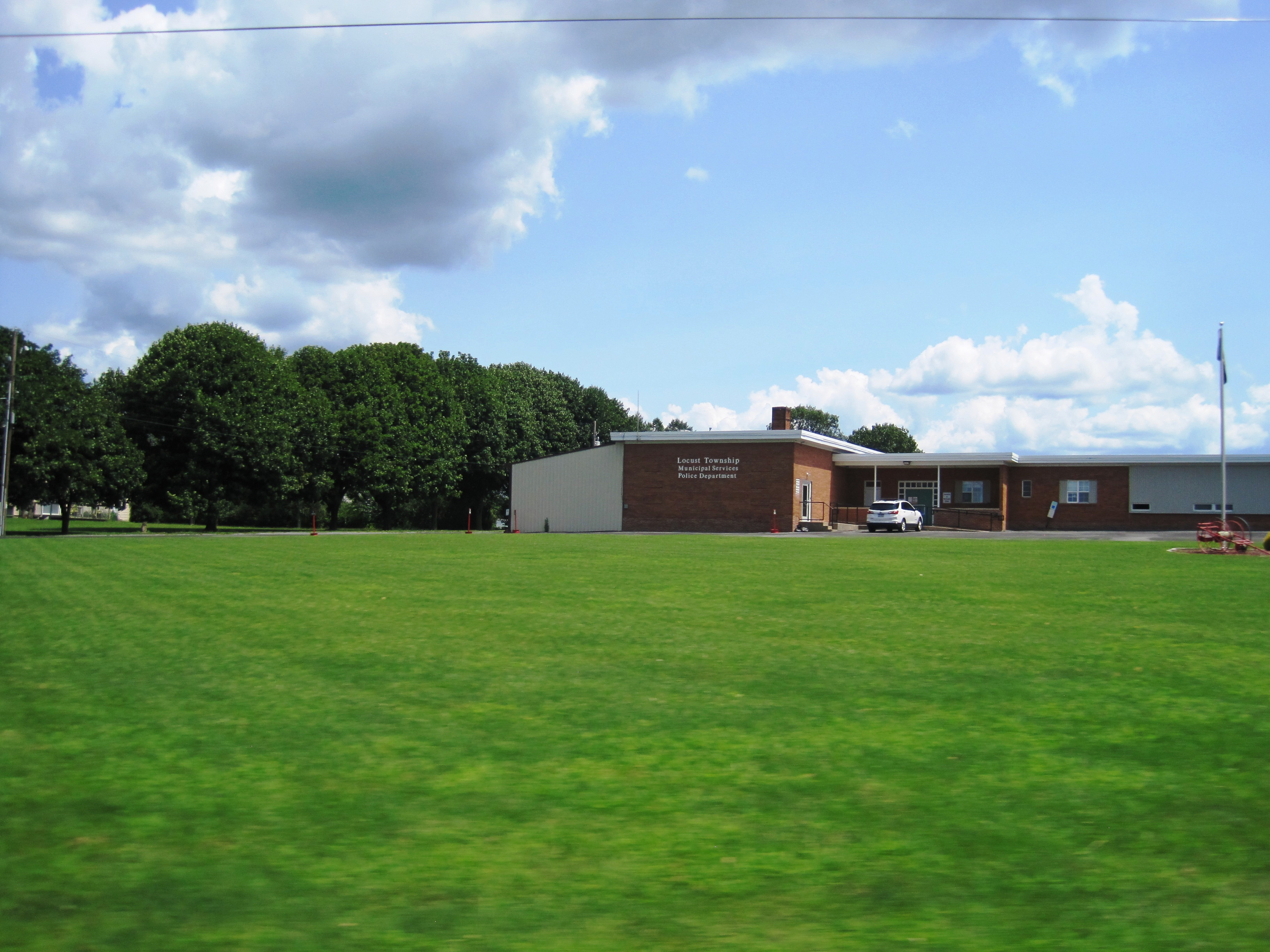
Locust Municipal Building

As of the census of 2000, there were 1,410 people, 572 households, and 427 families residing in the township. The population density was 78.5 inhabitants per square mile (30.3/km^{2}). There were 698 housing units at an average density of 38.9 units per square mile (15.0 units/km^{2}). The racial makeup of the township was 99.08% White, 0.07% African American, 0.07% Native American, 0.28% Asian, 0.43% from other races, and 0.07% from two or more races. Hispanic or Latino of any race were 1.13% of the population.

There were 572 households, out of which 28.3% had children under the age of 18 living with them, 64.9% were married couples living together, 5.2% had a female householder with no husband present, and 25.2% were non-families. 23.1% of all households were made up of individuals, and 12.4% had someone living alone who was 65 years of age or older. The average household size was 2.46 and the average family size was 2.89.

In the township the population was spread out, with 22.4% under the age of 18, 5.2% from 18 to 24, 28.4% from 25 to 44, 25.5% from 45 to 64, and 18.4% who were 65 years of age or older. The median age was 42 years. For every 100 females, there were 99.4 males. For every 100 females age 18 and over, there were 97.1 males.

The median income for a household in the township was $37,292, and the median income for a family was $44,539. Males had a median income of $32,900 versus $20,625 for females. The per capita income for the township was $16,522. About 3.8% of families and 6.6% of the population were below the poverty line, including 10.2% of those under age 18 and 6.5% of those age 65 or over.
