= Warrior Run (West Branch Susquehanna River tributary) =

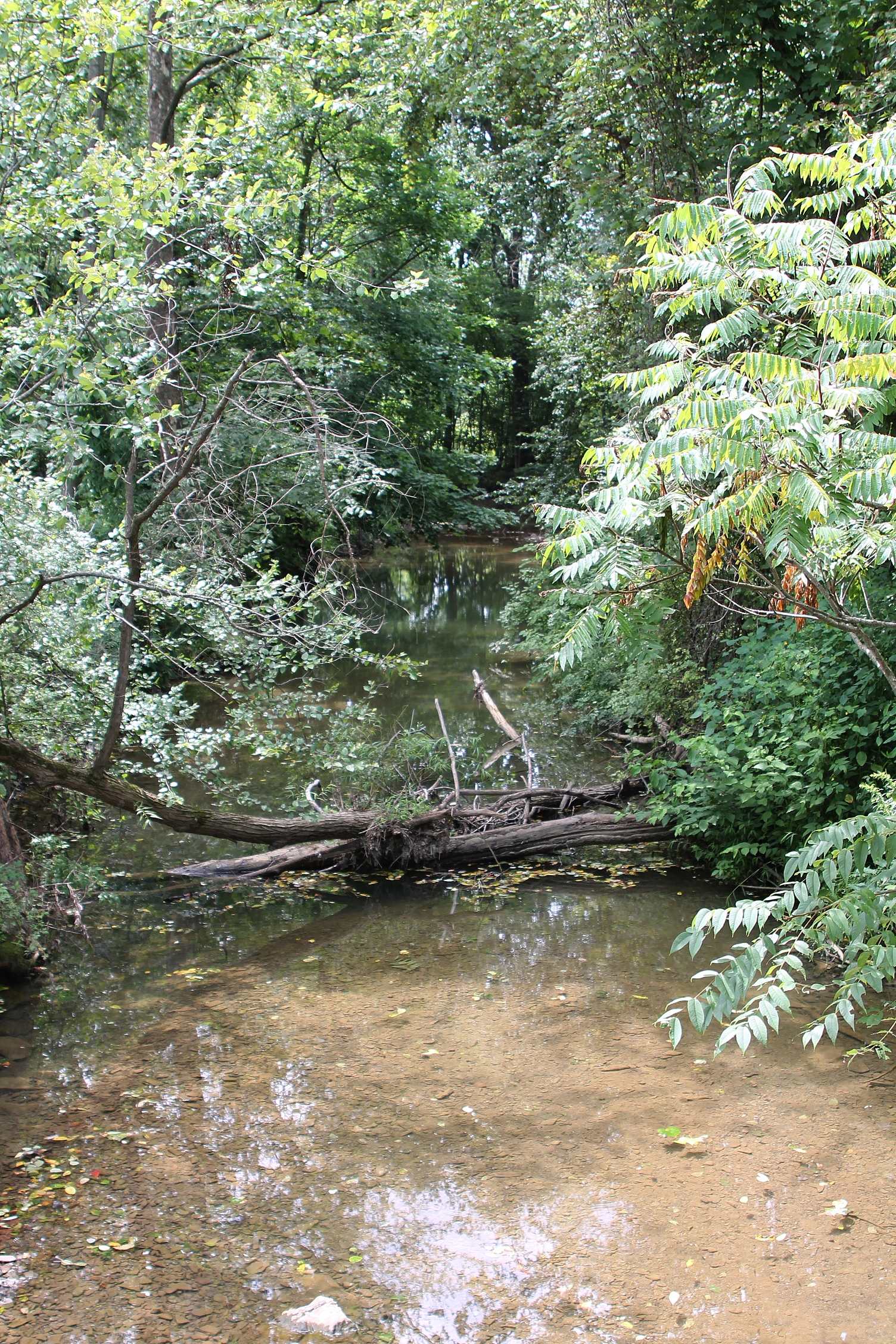

Physical characteristics
- Source
  - location: Delaware Township, Northumberland County, Pennsylvania
- Mouth
  - location: West Branch Susquehanna River at Delaware Township, Northumberland County, Pennsylvania
  - coordinates: 41°04′24″N 76°51′18″W
- Length: 9.5 mi (15.3 km)
- Basin size: 21.6 sq mi (56 km^{2})

Basin features
- Progression: West Branch Susquehanna River, Susquehanna River, Chesapeake Bay

Warrior Run (also known as Warrior Run Creek) is a tributary of the West Branch Susquehanna River in Northumberland County, Pennsylvania, in the United States. It is 9.5 miles (15.3 km) in length. It has a watershed area of 21.6 square miles and the watershed is in Northumberland and Lycoming Counties. The main soil series in the watershed is the Berks-Weikert-Bedington series and the main land uses are agriculture and forest. The communities of Watsontown, Turbotville, and McEwensville are all in or near the watershed. The Warrior Run watershed was inhabited by Europeans in the early 1770s. Several mills and forts were built along it.

== Course ==
Warrior Run begins in northeastern Delaware Township, in the Muncy Hills, not far from the border between Northumberland County and Lycoming County. It flows southwards, paralleling Interstate 180. As the stream leaves the Muncy Hills, it briefly passes through the western part of Lewis Township and goes under Pennsylvania Route 54. It flows near the Warrior Run High School and the community of Warrior Run before turning southwest and returning to Delaware Township. It then continues southwest past McEwensville, flows under Interstate 180, and continues west, paralleling Pennsylvania Route 44. The stream eventually crosses under Pennsylvania Route 44 and Pennsylvania Route 45 before emptying into the West Branch Susquehanna River near the southern edge of Watsontown.

=== Tributaries ===
The tributaries of Warrior Run are all unnamed tributaries.

== Geology ==
The Warrior Run watershed is located in the Appalachian Mountain section of the ridge-and-valley geographic region. The highest part of the watershed is the northern part, where the Muncy Hills are situated. The stream's source is 300 feet (91 m) higher than its mouth.

Thirty-five percent of the rocks in the upper reaches of the Warrior Run watershed are interbedded sedimentary rocks. These largely consist of the Hamilton Group, the Onondaga Formation, and the Old Port Formation Undivided. The remaining 65% of the rocks are sandstone and shale, mainly belonging to the Trimmers Rock Formation and the Wills Creek Formation. The Trimmers Rock Formation occurs in the entire northern part of the watershed. The Hamilton Group occurs in the central part of the watershed. Continuing southward, the next formation is the Old Port Formation Undivided, followed by the Keyser and Tonoloway Formation Undivided and then the Wills Creek Formation. The Bloomsburg and Mifflintown Formation Undivided occupies the southwestern corner of the watershed.

The most common soil series in the Warrior Run watershed is the Berks-Weikert-Bedington series, which is a shaly silt loam. The Watson-Berks-Alvira series and the Hagerstown-Edom-Washington series are also common within the watershed. The Berks-Weikert-Bedington series occurs throughout the northern and southern parts of the watershed, and the Watson-Berks-Alvira series occurs in the northern and central parts. The Hagerstown-Edom-Washington series occurs in the central part of the watershed. The Chenango-Pope-Holly series is found in the southwestern corner of the watershed, and the Leck Kill-Minersville-Calvin series is found in the eastern part of the watershed.

There is significant soil erosion along the banks of Warrior Run.

== Hydrology ==
The total load of sediment in Warrior Run is 13,951.62 pounds (6,328.35 kg) per day. A 10% reduction of this load is required to meet the total maximum daily load as determined by the Environmental Protection Agency. A total of 8,181.26 pounds (3,710.96 kg) per day of it comes from agricultural lands and 5,034.24 pounds (2,283.49 kg) per day comes from stream banks. The daily load of sediment from hay or pastures is 384 pounds (174 kg) and the load from low-intensity development is 167.18 pounds (75.83 kg). The load of sediment from land in transition and from unpaved roads is 40.88 pounds (18.54 kg) per day and 9.59 pounds (4.35 kg) per day. No sediment comes from wetlands. The daily load of phosphorus in the stream is 11.09 pounds (5.03 kg). To meet the total maximum daily load for phosphorus as determined by the Environmental Protection Agency, the load would have to be reduced by 25%. 6.99 pounds (3.17 kg) of the daily load of phosphorus comes from croplands, 2.65 pounds (1.20 kg) comes from groundwater, and 0.89 pounds (0.40 kg) comes from hay or pastures. 0.17 pounds (0.077 kg) comes from hay or pastures, and 0.11 pounds (0.050 kg) each comes from stream banks and septic systems. 0.06 pounds (0.027 kg) comes from land "in transition" (according to the Environmental Protection Agency) and 0.01 pounds (0.0045 kg) comes from unpaved roads. Wetlands do not contribute any phosphorus to the stream. All of the streams in the watershed are impaired according to the Environmental Protection Agency.

The annual average rainfall between 2005 and 2013 was 37.74 inches (95.9 cm) in the Warrior Run watershed. The average annual runoff was 0.13 inches (0.33 cm).

The boroughs of Turbotville and McEwensville both discharge treated sewage into streams in the Warrior Run watershed.

== Watershed ==
The area of the Warrior Run watershed is 21.6 square miles. It is located in Delaware Township and Lewis Township in Northumberland County and a small part of Muncy Creek Township, in Lycoming County. Turbotville is also partially within the boundaries of the watershed. The main highways in the watershed are Interstate 180 (running north–south) and Pennsylvania Route 54 (running east–west). There are also many township roads in the area.

Agricultural land makes up 55% of the Warrior Run watershed. Forested land makes up 35% of the watershed and developed land makes up 10% of it. Most of the forested land is confined to the northern reaches of the watershed. The watershed contains 17.3 acres of wetlands.

== History ==
According to John Franklin Meginness, Warrior Run has been relevant to Northumberland County history since near the beginning of European habitation in the area.

A historic Native American trail once ran from Northumberland to Muncy, passing by the mouth of Warrior Run and the Muncy Hills on the way. By the late 1800s, a public road occupied the course of this path. John Shikellamy, the oldest son of the Oneida chief Shikellamy, owned a hunting lodge at the mouth of Warrior Run. The lodge was known as the Warrior's Camp. Shikellamy himself lived in an area between Warrior Run and Chillisquaque Creek in around 1737.

In May 1769, a lot of 609 acres, including the present-day community of Watsontown, was surveyed at the mouth of Warrior Run. Captain Daniel Piper came to own this land. European Settlers arrived at the stream, four miles (seven kilometers) upstream of the mouth, in 1772, making them the first European settlers in that area. These settlers included Jacob Freeland, John Vincent, Peter Vincent, and Cornelius Vincent. Fort Freeland was built on the site in 1775 to protect the settlers from the Indians. It was a stockaded log house with half an acre of land inside the walls. The fort provided visibility for approximately a mile upstream and downstream. It was destroyed on July 28, 1779 by 100 British troops under the command of John McDonald and 200 Indians commanded by Hiokoto, a Seneca chief. Hawkins Boone, a relative of Daniel Boone, built Fort Boone at the mouth of the stream. Fort Meninger was also located there. John Watson had the idea to build a community at the mouth of Warrior Run, which he started building in 1794. Originally known as Slabtown, its name was later changed to Watsontown. Daniel Vincent purchased 400 acres surrounding Fort Freeland and constructed a mill there. It was renovated in 1818 and remained as late as the early 1900s.

Jacob Freeland constructed a gristmill on the stream in 1773. An 1891 book of Northumberland County history referred to this mill as Freeland's Mill. Daniel Vincent built another mill on Muddy Run out of logs some time before 1792. In 1792, it was replaced with a stone structure. The Wilson Mill was later also built on the stream. In the 1840s, the community of Watsontown had one or two mills on Warrior Run.

== Biology ==
Where Warrior Run flows through agricultural land, there is very little riparian bufferring. Livestock are also able to freely access the stream in places.

== Recreation ==
The Warrior Run Community Corporation plans to establish a walking trail along Warrior Run from McEwensville to the Muncy Hills. Since 2006, there has been a 5-kilometer (3.1-mile) footrace partially along Warrior Run near the Warrior Run Middle School.

== See also ==
- Muddy Run (West Branch Susquehanna River), next tributary of the West Branch Susquehanna River going downstream
- White Deer Creek, next tributary of the West Branch Susquehanna River going upstream
- List of rivers of Pennsylvania
