= Warrior Run High School =

Public school in Turbotville, Pennsylvania

Coordinates: 41.1035°N 76.8030°W

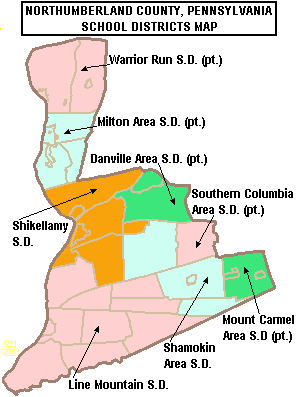
- Fragment of WRSD in northern part of Northumberland County

Location
- 4800 Susquehanna Trail; Turbotville, Union County, Northumberland County, Montour County, Pennsylvania 17772; United States

Information
- Type: Public
- Principal: Nathan Minium
- Faculty: 41 teachers (2013); 41 teachers (2011–12)
- Teaching staff: 50.70 (FTE)
- Grades: 9-12
- Enrollment: 664 (2023-2024)
- Student to teacher ratio: 13.10
- Language: English
- Colors: Blue and Gray
- Mascot: Defenders
- Website: http://www.wrsd.org/

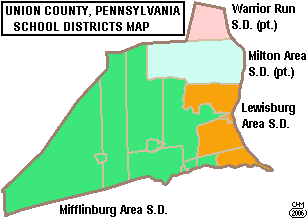
Warrior Run School District region in Union County

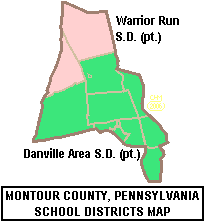
Warrior Run School District region in Montour County

Warrior Run High School is a small, rural public high school located in Turbotville, Pennsylvania. It is the sole high school operated by the Warrior Run School District. It serves the residents of the boroughs of Turbotville, McEwensville and Watsontown. It also serves Gregg Township in Union County, Delaware Township and Lewis Township in Northumberland County; as well as Anthony Township and Limestone Township in Montour County. In 2016, Warrior Run High School reported its enrollment was 479 pupils. Warrior Run High School students may choose to attend Lycoming Career and Technology Center for training in the building trades, automotive technology, culinary arts, allied health services and child care. The Central Susquehanna Intermediate Unit CSIU16 provides the high school with a wide variety of services like specialized education for disabled students and hearing, speech and visual disability services and professional development for staff and faculty.

== Extracurriculars ==
The Warrior Run School District offers a variety of extracurriculars, including clubs, activities and an extensive sports program. The sports programs are through the Pennsylvania Heartland Athletic Conference and the Pennsylvania Interscholastic Athletic Association. The Pennsylvania Heartland Athletic Conference is a voluntary association of 25 PIAA High Schools within the central Pennsylvania region.

=== Sports ===
The district funds:

Boys

- Baseball - Varsity and JV teams AAA
- Basketball- AAA
- Cross country - Class AA
- Football - Varsity and JV teams AA
- Golf - AA
- Soccer - AA
- Track and field - AA
- Wrestling - AA

Girls

- Basketball - AAA
- Cross country - A
- Field hockey - A
- Golf - AA
- Soccer - A
- Softball - Varsity and JV teams AAA
- Track and field - AA

Middle school sports

Boys

- Basketball
- Football
- Soccer
- Wrestling

Girls

- Basketball
- Field hockey

- According to PIAA directory July 2012 Updated per 2017 Directory
