= Warrior Run =

Warrior Run may refer to:

- Warrior Run, Pennsylvania
- Warrior Run School District
- Warrior Run Generating Station
- Warrior Run Presbyterian Church
- Warrior Run (West Branch Susquehanna River)
