= Muddy Run (West Branch Susquehanna River tributary) =

Creek in Pennsylvania, US

Coordinates: 41.0503°N 76.8534°W

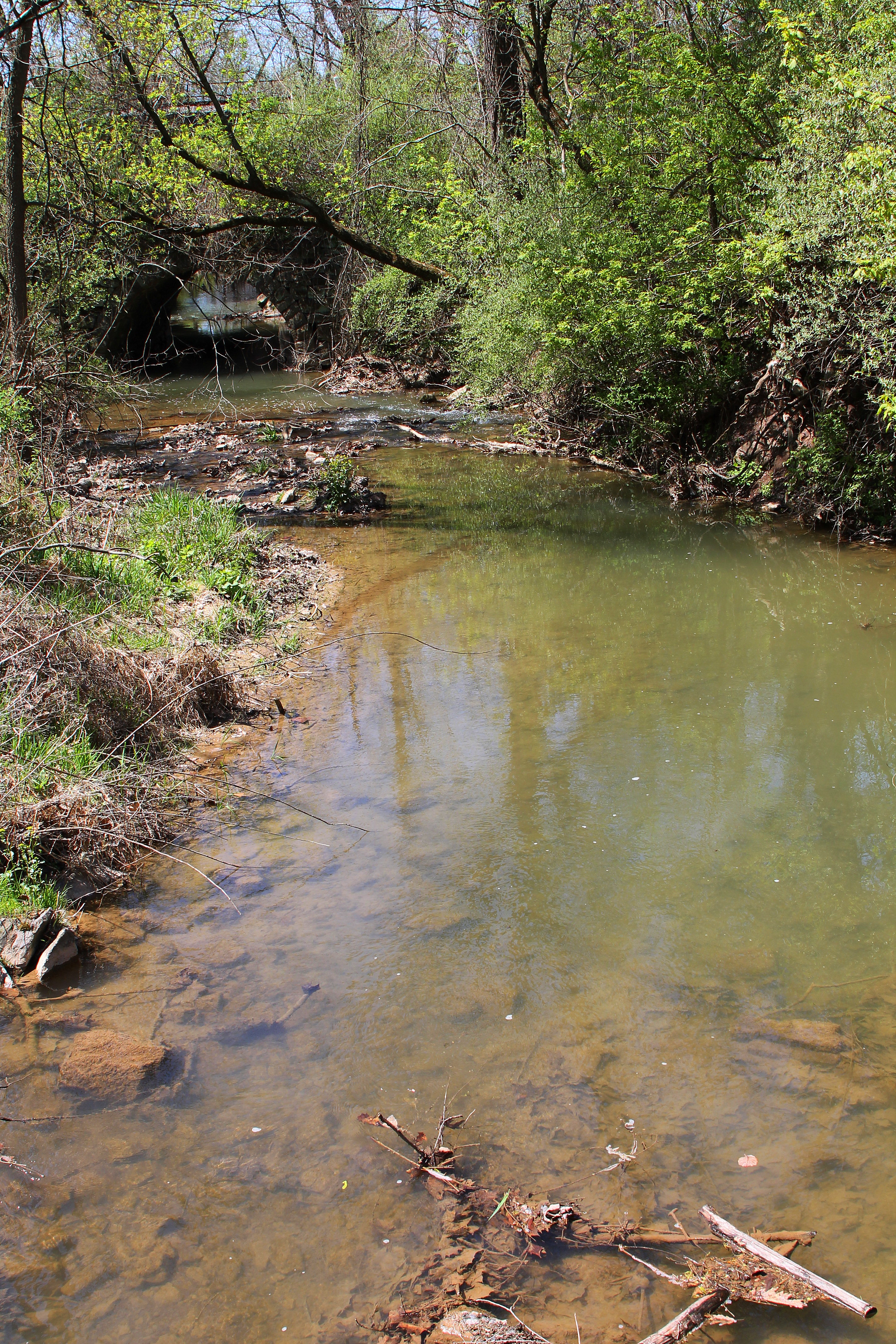
Muddy Run looking downstream

Muddy Run is a tributary of the West Branch Susquehanna River in Northumberland County, Pennsylvania, in the United States. It is 5.4 miles (8.7 km) in length. The creek is several miles northeast of the community of Milton. Main land uses include agricultural land and forest. The area of the creek's watershed is 11.4 square miles (30 km^{2}), most of which is agricultural land. Muddy Run is entirely within Turbot Township. Most of the rock in the watershed is shale. The most common soil series is the Berks-Weikert-Bedington series.

== Course ==
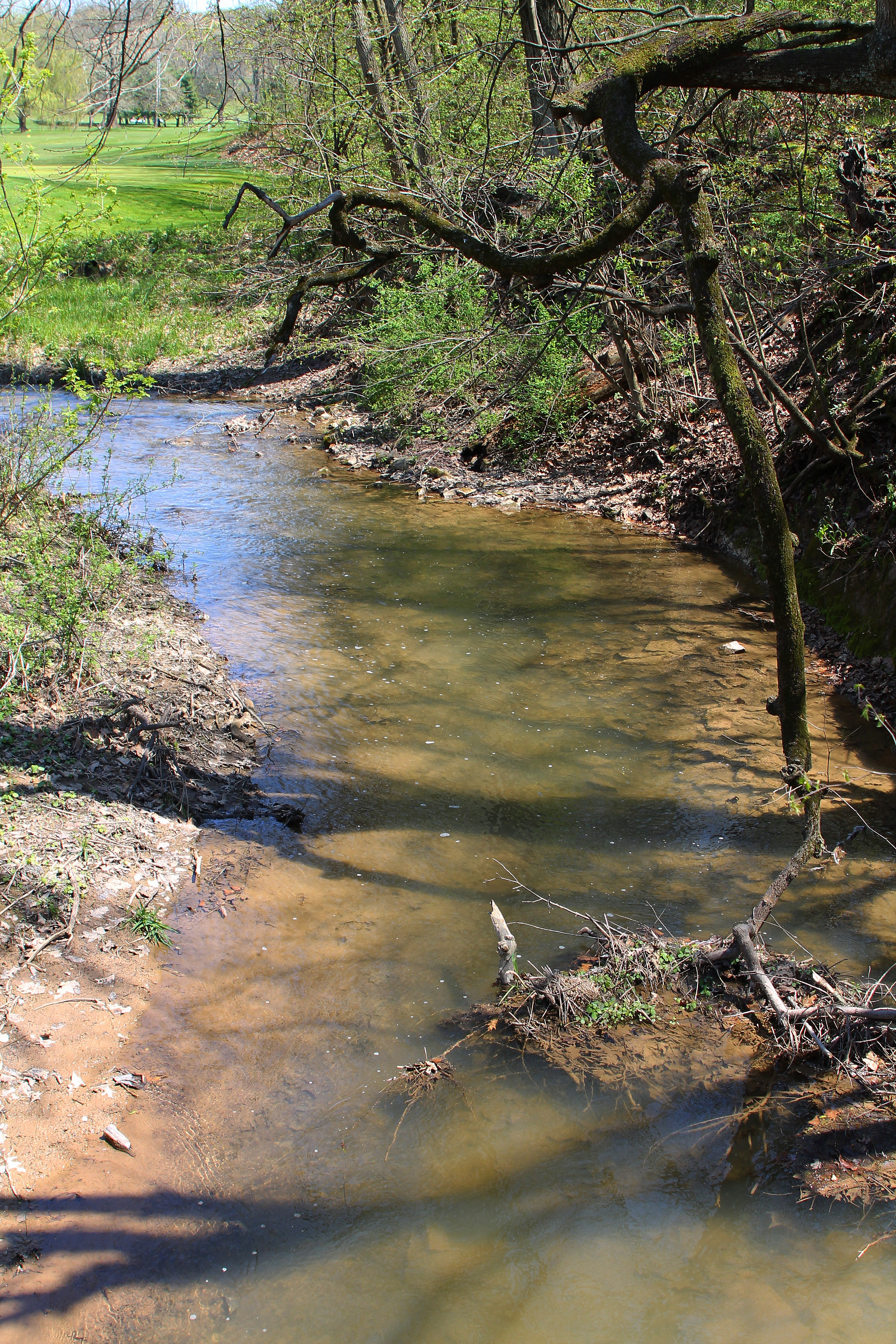
Muddy Run looking upstream

Muddy Run begins in a valley in eastern Turbot Township, near the Paradise Church. The creek heads westward before turning south and then southwest. It crosses under Interstate 80 and turns due west again. After some distance, the creek crosses under Pennsylvania Route 147 and turns northwest past a country club. North of the country club, it turns abruptly north and then west again, crossing under Pennsylvania Route 405 and entering the West Branch Susquehanna River.

=== Tributaries ===
Muddy Run's main tributaries are unnamed.

== Hydrology ==
The Hoeganaes Corporation, in the northwestern part of the watershed, is the only entity permitted to discharge sediment in the Muddy Run watershed. There is a total daily load of 10,453.416 pounds (4,741.590 kg) of sediment. 8,233.3699 pounds (3,734.5938 kg) comes from cropland, 1,565.5804 pounds (710.1353 kg) comes from the banks of streams, and 544.8767 pounds (247.1519 kg) comes from land used for hay or pastures. A total of 99.5616 pounds (45.1604 kg) comes from developed land, 9.9726 pounds (4.5235 kg) comes from forests, and 0.0548 pounds (0.0249 kg) comes from wetlands.

The average annual amount of precipitation between the early 1990s and the early 2010s was 37.7 inches (96 cm). The average amount of annual runoff during the same time period was 0.14 inches (0.36 cm).

== Geology ==
In the Muddy Run watershed, 90% of the rock is shale from the Bloomsburg/Mifflinburg Formation Undivided and the Wills Creek Formation. The remaining 10% is composed of siltstone and limestone from the Keyser/Tonoloway Formation Undivided. Most of the western part of the watershed is on the Bloomsburg/Mifflinburg Formation Undivided, with the exception of a band in the central-western part of the watershed, which is on the Wills Creek Formation. The Keyser/Tonoloway Formation Undivided occurs in an area in the northeastern part of the watershed. The rest of the watershed is on the Wills Creek Formation.

The main soil series in the Muddy Run watershed is the Berks-Weikert-Bedington, which is a silt-loam with shale. Other soil types in the watershed include the Chenango-Pope-Holly series, the Hagerstown-Edom-Washington series, and the Leck Kill-Meckesville-Calvin series. The Berks-Weikert-Bedington series occurs in the central and northwestern part of the watershed. The Chenango-Pope-Holly series is found in an area in the extreme western area of the watershed. The Hagerstown-Edom-Washington series is found in the eastern section of the watershed. The Leck Kill-Meckesville-Calvin soil series occurs in the southwestern and north-central areas of the watershed.

The stream banks of Muddy Run are eroded in some locations. The elevation of the creek at its mouth is 429 feet (131 m) above sea level.

== Watershed ==
The area of the Muddy Run watershed is approximately 11.4 square miles (30 km^{2}). 75% of the watershed is devoted to agriculture 15% is forested, and 10% is developed. In specific, 3402.6 acres of the watershed are for growing crops, 2083.1 acres are for hay or pastures, 1045.3 acres are forest, and 630.1 acres are considered "low-intensity development" by the Environmental Protection Agency. 93.9 acres are turf, 37.1 acres are considered "transition" by the Environmental Protection Agency, and 17.3 acres are wetland. Much of the forest and developed land is in the western half of the watershed.

The main roads in the Muddy Run watershed are Interstate 80, Pennsylvania Route 147 in the western part of the watershed, and a number of township roads throughout the watershed. The watershed occupies part of Milton Township, Turbot Township, Delaware Township in Northumberland County. It also occupies a small area of western Limestone Township, in Montour County.

== History ==
The first mill in Turbot Township was built on Muddy Run by Hawkins Boone some time before 1779. In 1785, Cornelius Waldron and his son Laffert arrived at the mouth of Muddy Run. Laffert Waldron later purchased a tract of farmland on the creek. In 1840, Abraham Straub moved a gristmill to a location on the creek. The Muddy Run school was historically located on Muddy Run.

Fort Boone was built at the mouth of Muddy Run.

Part of the area Muddy Run flowed through was historically referred to as "Paradise".

== Biology ==
There are no riparian buffers in certain areas along Muddy Run. Livestock such as cattle have unlimited access to the creek in some places.

== See also ==
- Limestone Run (Montour and Northumberland Counties, Pennsylvania), next tributary of the West Branch Susquehanna River going downriver
- Warrior Run (West Branch Susquehanna River), next tributary of the West Branch Susquehanna River going upriver
- List of rivers of Pennsylvania
