= Warrior Creek =

Warrior Creek may refer to:

- Warrior Creek (Georgia)
- Warrior Creek (Pennsylvania)

== See also ==
- Warrior Run (disambiguation)
