= Limestone Run (Montour and Northumberland Counties, Pennsylvania) =

Coordinates: 41°01′04″N 76°51′25″W

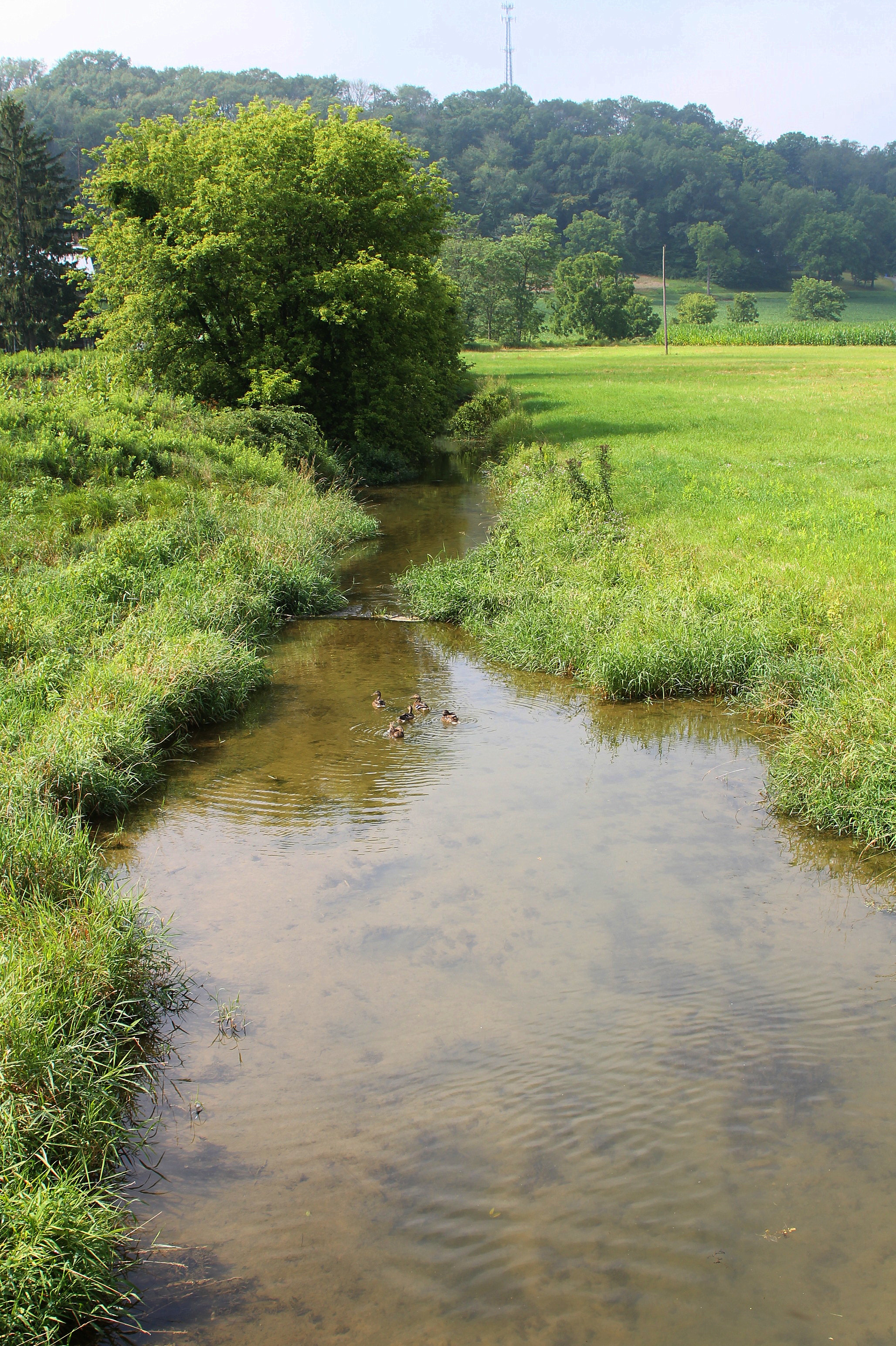
- Limestone Run looking downstream

Physical characteristics
- Source
  - location: Seven Springs Farm in Limestone Township, Montour County, Pennsylvania
  - elevation: between 620 and 640 feet (190 and 200 m)
- Mouth
  - location: West Branch Susquehanna River in Milton, Northumberland County, Pennsylvania
  - elevation: 440 ft (130 m)
- Length: 8.8 mi (14.2 km)
- Basin size: 11.6 sq mi (30 km^{2})

Basin features
- Progression: West Branch Susquehanna River → Susquehanna River → Chesapeake Bay
- Tributaries
  - left: two unnamed tributaries
  - right: nine unnamed tributaries

Limestone Run is a tributary of the West Branch Susquehanna River, in Montour County and Northumberland County, in Pennsylvania, in the United States. It is 8.8 miles (14.2 km) long and flows through Limestone Township in Montour County and Turbot Township and Milton in Northumberland County. The watershed has an area of 11.6 square miles (30 km^{2}). Slightly under 2,500,000 pounds (1,100,000 kg) of sediment flow through the stream annually. The stream's watershed is in the ridge and valley physiographic province.

The watershed of Limestone Run is mostly agricultural. However, other land uses in the stream's watershed include forests, developed land, wetlands, and coal mines. Several mills in Milton and Turbot Township historically drew their power from Limestone Run. The Pennsylvania Canal and Limestone Run Aqueduct also crossed the stream in Milton. Major floods of the stream include one in August 1817 and one in June 1972. The stream's watershed is designated as a Warmwater Fishery and a Migratory Fishery.

== Course ==
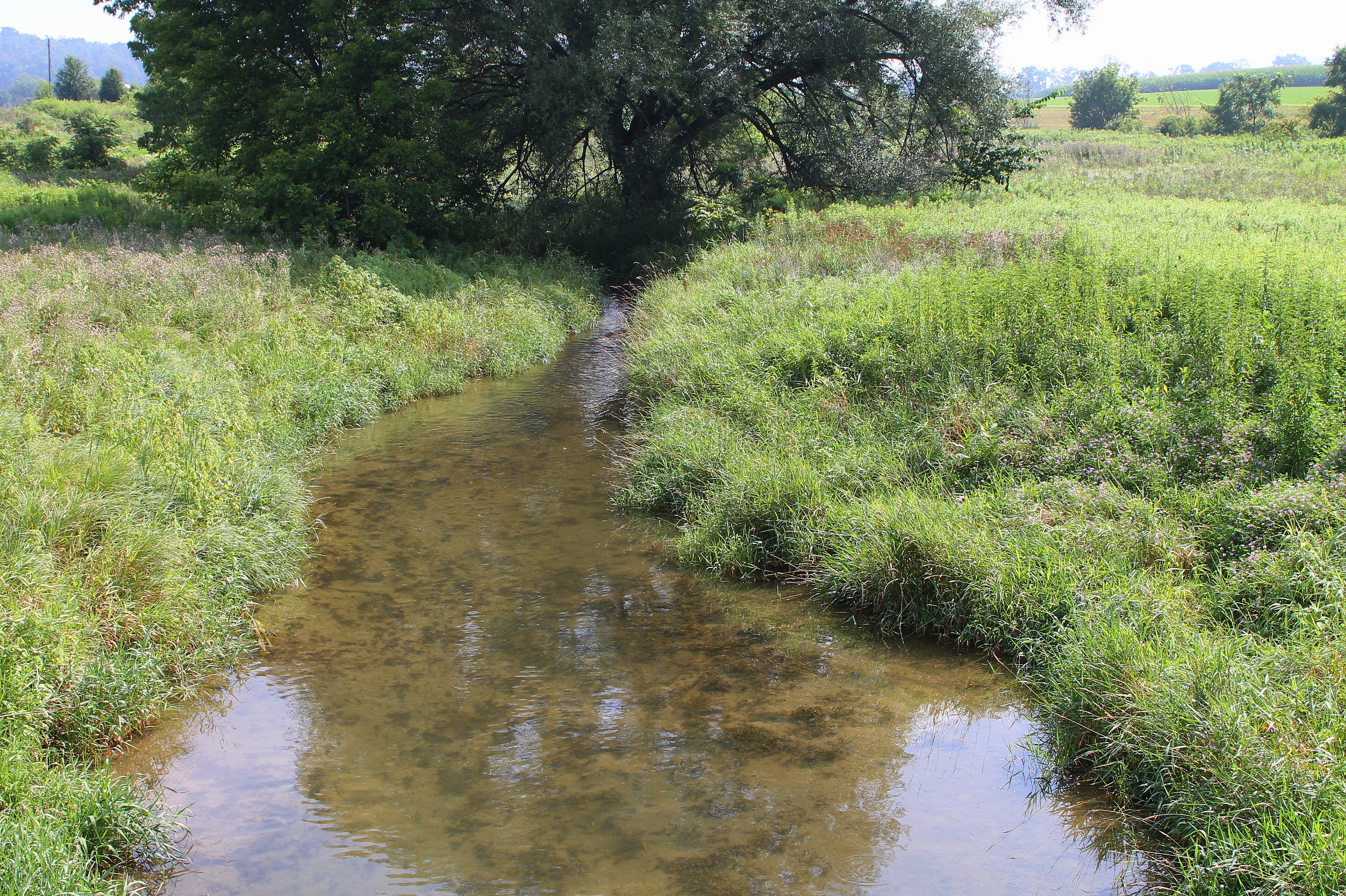
Limestone Run looking upstream in Montour County

Limestone Run begins at the Seven Springs Farm in Limestone Township, Montour County. It flows southwest for a few miles, passing the community of Limestoneville and flowing under Pennsylvania Route 254. At this point, the stream turns west, paralleling Limestone Ridge. It exits Limestone Township and enters the southern part of Turbot Township, Northumberland County. The stream continues west, parting from Limestone Ridge and crossing under Interstate 80 and then Pennsylvania Route 147 before entering the borough of Milton. It reaches its confluence with the West Branch Susquehanna River on the other side of Milton, near Milton State Park.

Limestone Run joins the West Branch Susquehanna River 11.19 miles (18.01 km) upriver of its mouth.

=== Tributaries ===
Limestone Run has no named tributaries. However, it has a number of unnamed tributaries. Nine of these enter the stream from the left and two of them enter it from the right.

== Hydrology and climate ==
Limestone Run is designated as an impaired waterbody by the Pennsylvania Department of Environmental Protection. The cause of the impairment is siltation and the source is agriculture. No part of Limestone Run or its tributaries attains stream standards set by the Pennsylvania Department of Environmental Protection.

The annual load of sediment in Limestone Run is 3,352,600 pounds (1,520,700 kg). Of this 2,478,400 pounds (1,124,200 kg) per year comes from croplands and 687,000 pounds (312,000 kg) per year comes from stream banks. Another 71,800 pounds (32,600 kg) per year comes from transitional land, 58,200 pounds (26,400 kg) comes from land used for hay or pastures, 28,600 pounds (13,000 kg) comes from low-intensity development, and 19,600 pounds (8,900 kg) comes from forests. An annual sediment load of 4,600 pounds (2,100 kg) comes from high intensity development, 4,400 pounds (2,000 kg) comes from coal mines, and no sediment is contributed by wetlands.

The average annual rainfall in the Limestone Run watershed between 2005 and 2013 was 37.7 inches (96 cm). The average annual runoff in this time period was 2.2 inches (5.6 cm).

== Geography and geology ==
The elevation near the mouth of Limestone Run is 440 feet (130 m) above sea level. The elevation of the stream's source is between 620 and 640 feet (190 and 200 m) above sea level.

The elevation in the Limestone Run watershed ranges from under 480 feet (150 m) above sea level to more than 760 feet (230 m) above sea level. The source is approximately 130 feet (40 m) higher than the mouth, making the stream move relatively slowly. The entire watershed is in the ridge and valley geographic region. The rocks in the watershed are 60% carbonate rocks and 40% shale.

Limestone Run's floodplain in Milton is located between Race Street and Center Street. This area is mostly uninhabited due to flooding concerns.

The historian J.J. John wrote that Limestone Run was "a stream of relatively greater geographical importance than its volume would indicate".

== Watershed ==
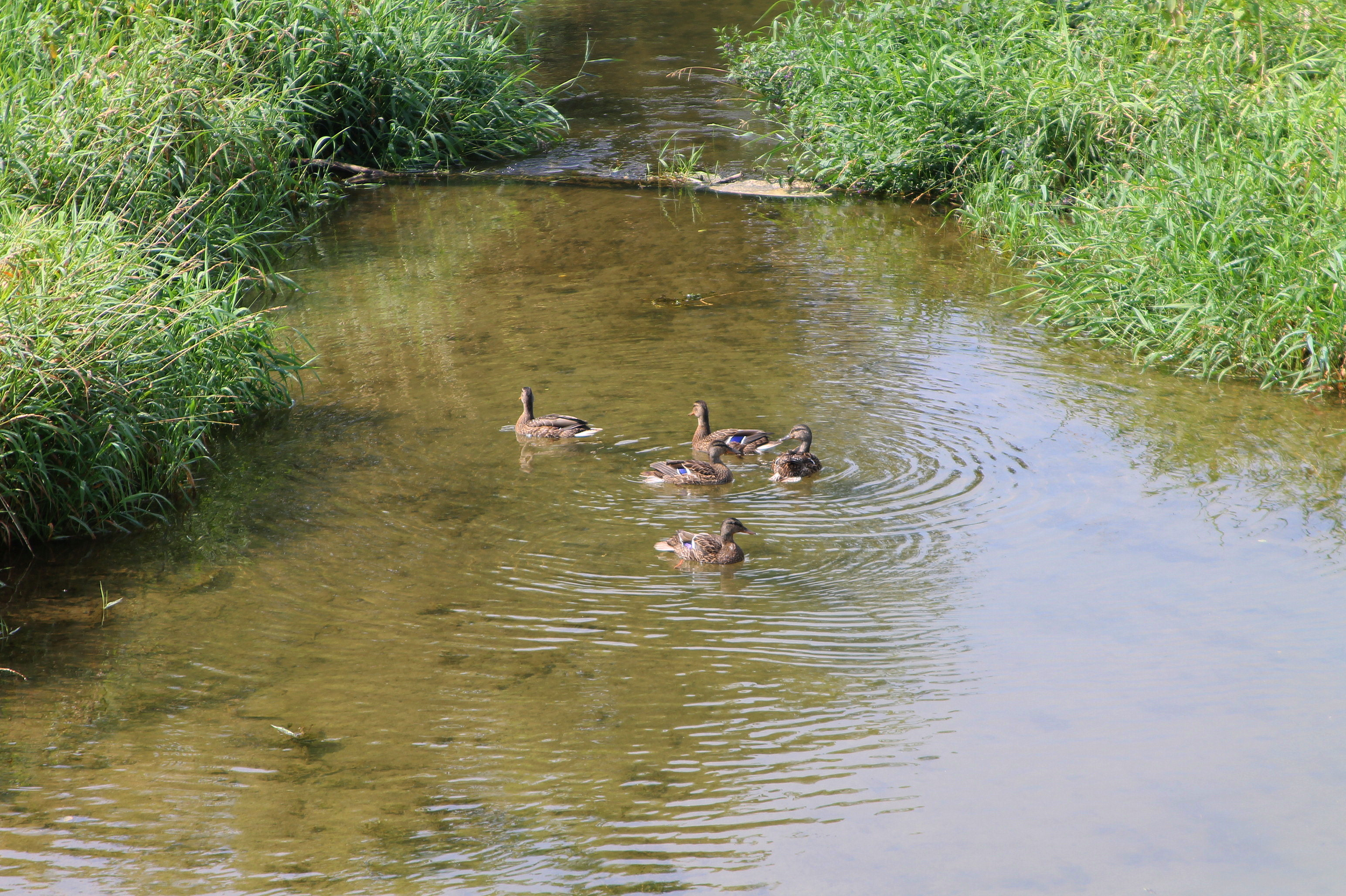
Ducks on Limestone Run

The watershed of Limestone Run has an area of 11.6 square miles (30 km^{2}). The mouth of the stream is in the United States Geological Survey quadrangle of Milton. However, its source is in the quadrangle of Washingtonville. The village of California is located near the headwaters of the stream. Pennsylvania Route 254 is also in the stream's vicinity.

A total of 72.7 percent of the watershed of Limestone Run is agricultural land, 13.4 percent is forest, 11.8 percent is low-intensity development, and 1.5 percent is high-intensity development. Additionally, 0.4 percent of the watershed consists of wetlands and 0.2 percent consists of coal mines. There are 19.3 miles (31.1 km) of streams in the watershed.

In addition to croplands and pastures, feedlots, barnyards, and area of manure stacking line the banks of Limestone Run in some areas.

== History ==
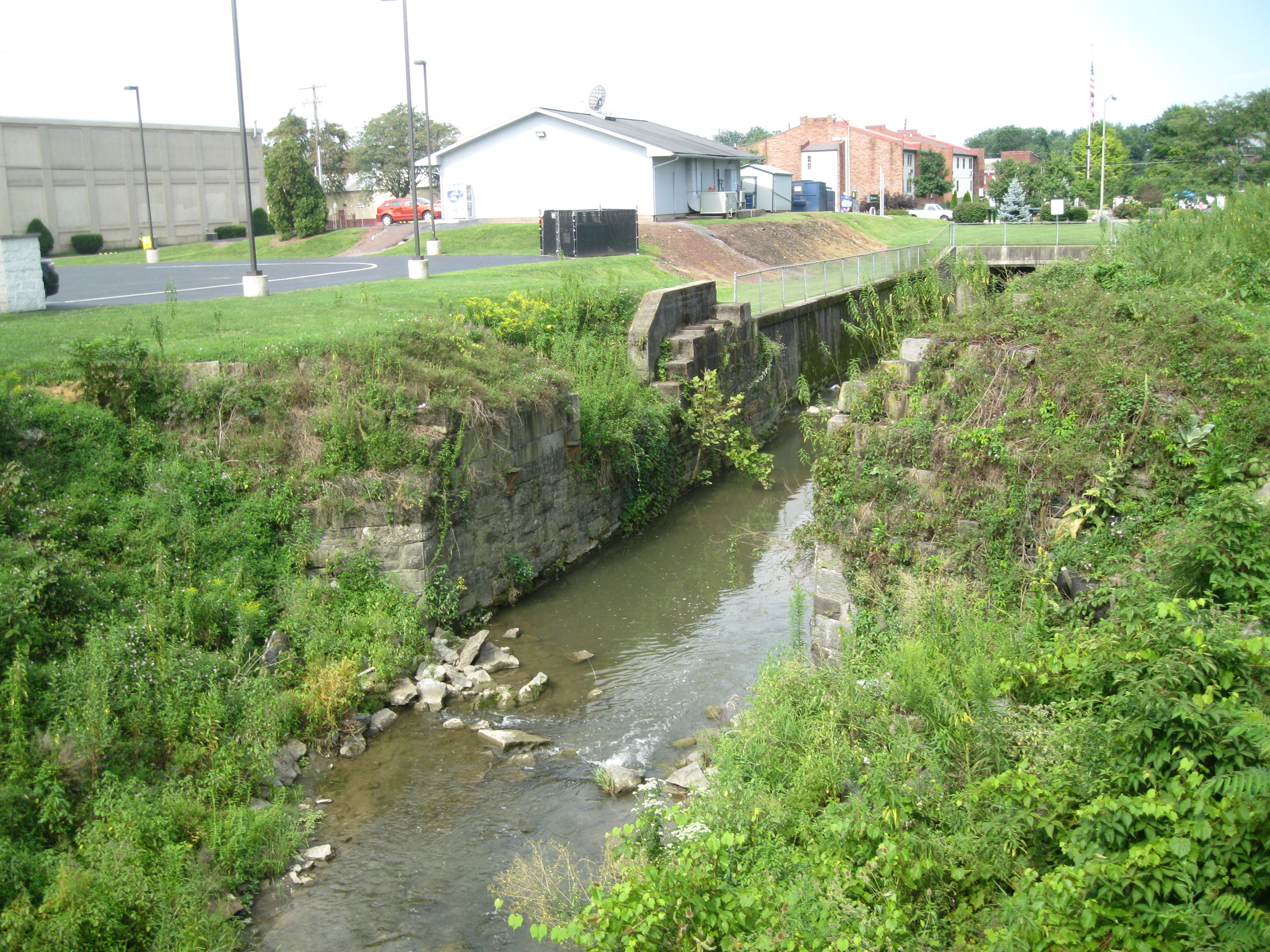
The remains of the Pennsylvania Canal and Limestone Run Aqueduct on Limestone Run

Limestone Run was entered into the Geographic Names Information System on August 2, 1979. Its identifier in the Geographic Names Information System is 1179364.

Marcus Huling was one of the first people to settle in what is now Milton, building a house there in 1772. He also established a tavern on Limestone Run. In 1774, a person living in Buffalo Township, Union County purchased several hundred acres along the stream.

In 1791, Andrew Straub built a mill on Limestone Run. It was the first manufacturing industry in Milton. It was destroyed in 1815 to make way for the Baker's Grist Mill. The Baker's Grist Mill was a gristmill on Limestone Run (and powered by the stream) at South Front Street in Milton. The latter mill was built in 1815 by George Eckert Jr. It was destroyed when Limestone Run flooded on August 9, 1817, due to heavy rainfall at the stream's headwaters, an event known as the Great Limestone Run flood of 1817. The mill burned down on May 14, 1880 and ceased to be powered by Limestone Run upon being rebuilt. It fell into disuse in 1885 and was destroyed in 1892. A carding mill and sickle factory were built on the mouth of Limestone Run some time before 1817. This mill and factory was damaged in the 1817 flood of the stream. Additionally, Moses and Samuel Teas owned a distilling business on Limestone Run. A stone mill was built at the mouth of the stream some time before 1838. William Follmer also owned a mill in the southeastern part of Turbot Township. In the 1840s, there were several flour mills in Milton that were powered by the stream.

Prior to the advent of railroads, the area along Limestone Run was mostly home to small industries. When Limestone Run flooded in 1817, at least one bridge was destroyed, in addition to the Baker's Grist Mill. After the flood, the Pennsylvania legislature contributed $5000 to the construction of a post bridge over the stream. In June 1972, the stream flooded due to Hurricane Agnes, partially contributing to a significant alteration of the appearance of Milton. The Pennsylvania Canal and Limestone Run Aqueduct, which is on Limestone Run in Milton, was added to the National Register of Historic Places on December 19, 1978.

== Biology ==
The drainage basin of Limestone Run is designated as a Warmwater Fishery and a Migratory Fishery.

There is little or no riparian buffering along Limestone Run. The Montour County Conservation District has had plans to remedy the lack of riparian buffering with the Jeremy Erb project. A proposed greenway known as the Limestone Run Greenway was mentioned in the Northumberland County Greenways Open Space Plan. It would consist entirely of 5.1 miles (8.2 km) of conservation land along the stream.

== See also ==
- Buffalo Creek (West Branch Susquehanna River), next tributary of the West Branch Susquehanna River going downriver
- Muddy Run (West Branch Susquehanna River), next tributary of the West Branch Susquehanna River going upriver
- List of rivers of Pennsylvania
