= Turbotville, Pennsylvania =

Borough in Pennsylvania, US

- Borough
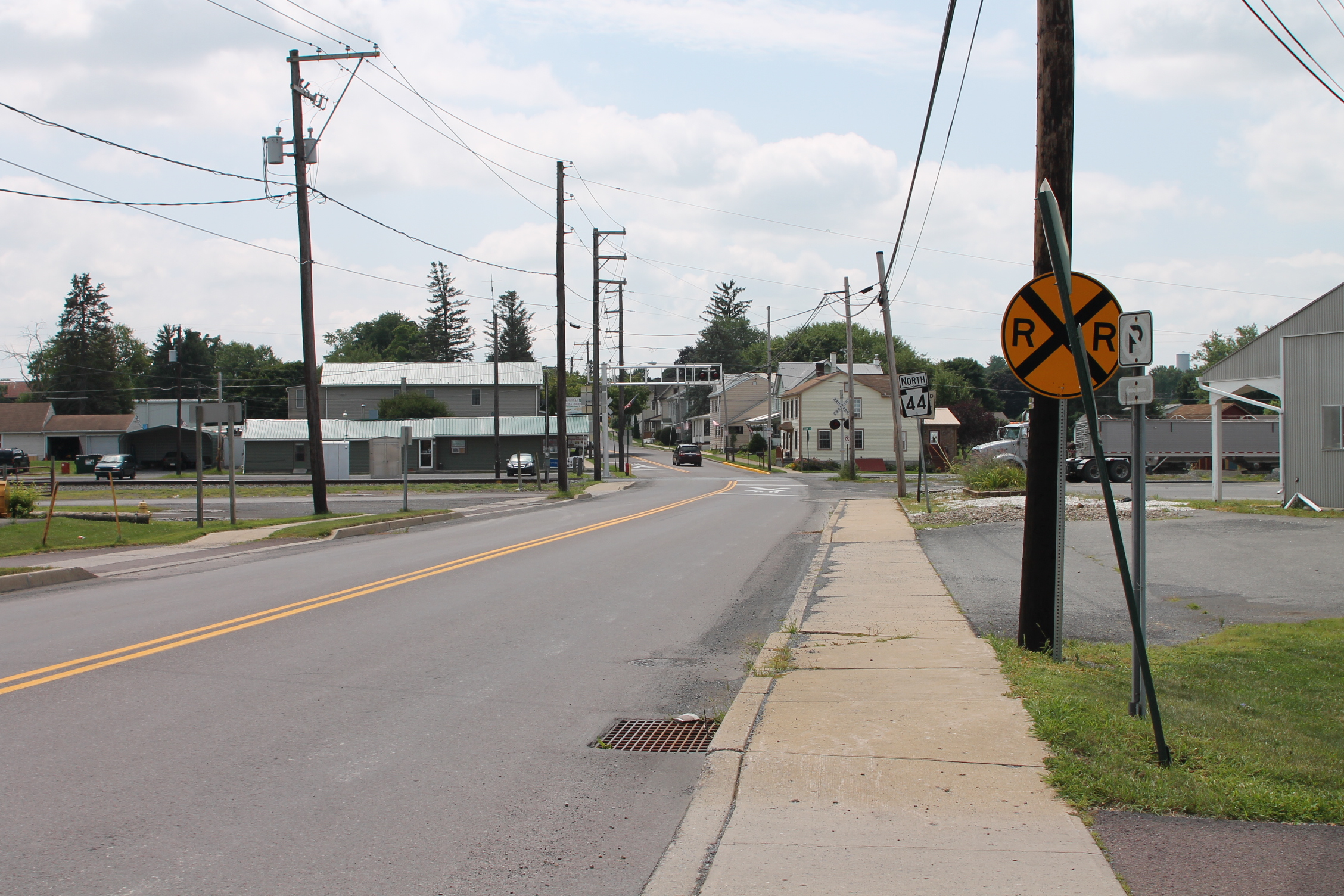
- Pennsylvania Route 44 in Turbotville

- Location of Turbotville in Northumberland County, Pennsylvania.

- Location on Turbotville in Pennsylvania Turbotville (the United States)
- Coordinates: 41°06′09″N 76°46′16″W
- Country: United States
- State: Pennsylvania
- County: Northumberland
- Settled: 1850
- Incorporated: 1858

Government
  - Type: Municipal Government
  - Body: Borough Council
  - Mayor: Benjamin Gilbert
  - Council President: Christina Mensch

Area
  - Total: 0.45 sq mi (1.17 km^{2})
  - Land: 0.45 sq mi (1.17 km^{2})
  - Water: 0 sq mi (0.00 km^{2})
- Elevation (center of borough): 575 ft (175 m)
- Highest elevation (southwestern part of borough): 600 ft (180 m)
- Lowest elevation (tributary to Warrior Run at northwestern end of borough): 530 ft (160 m)

Population (2020)
  - Total: 677
  - Density: 1,500.0/sq mi (579.15/km^{2})
- Time zone: UTC−5 (Eastern (EST))
  - Summer (DST): UTC−4 (EDT)
- ZIP Code: 17772
- Area code: 570
- FIPS code: 42-77832
- Website: https://turbotvillepa.org/

Turbotville is a borough in Northumberland County, Pennsylvania, United States. The population was 677 at the time of the 2020 census.

== Geography ==
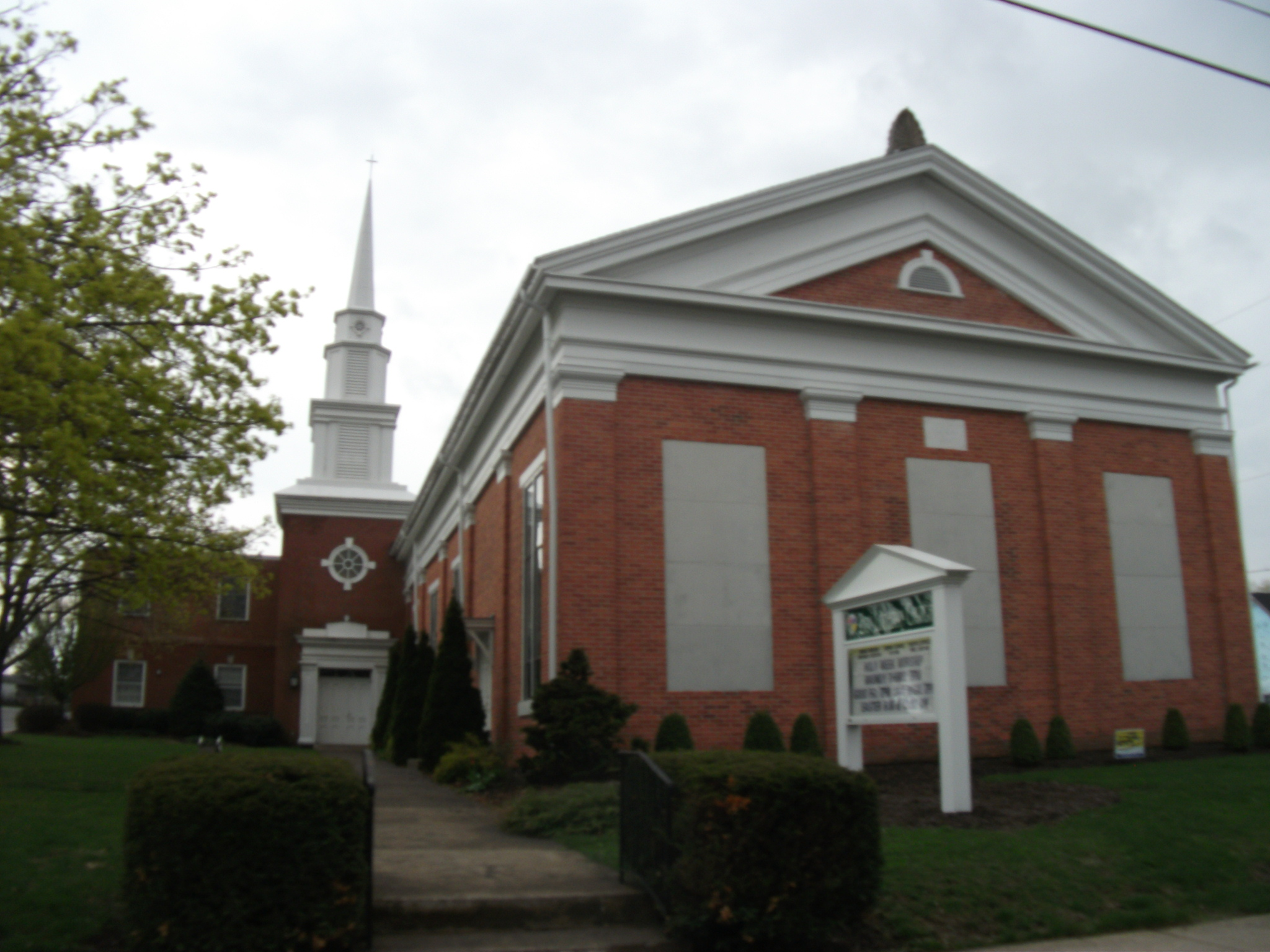
Church in Turbotville

Turbotville is located at 41°6′9″N 76°46′16″W (41.102454, –76.771188). According to the United States Census Bureau, the borough has a total area of 0.4 square mile (1.2 km^{2}), all land.

Turbotville is located along the Upper Susquehanna River in the north-central part of Pennsylvania. Turbotville is the northernmost town in Northumberland County, and is surrounded on all sides by Lewis Township.

== History ==
The greater part of the site of the borough was once owned by Jacob Sechler and wife Catherine, who had received a land grant from Governor Thomas Penn, son of William Penn. Sechler named his land "Green Lawn"; it included the area of present-day Main Street, Church Street, and the Turbotville Cemetery, and extended into present-day Lewis Township.

The settlement was originally called Snydertown, after Philip Reifsnyder, believed to be one of the first European-American settlers of the area. Reifsnyder, a blacksmith by trade, built a tavern southwest of the intersection of Main and Paradise streets; it was operated by his wife. He also operated a blacksmith shop southeast of the intersection of Main and Church streets.

Prior to being incorporated, the town name was changed to Tributville (spelled Turbotville today). The town lay within Turbot Township, and later in Lewis Township. The township and town were named after Colonel Turbutt Francis. After his service in several wars, Colonel Francis was compensated for his service with a land grant called the "Colonel's Reward", which encompasses much of the area south of Turbotville, including present-day Turbot Township.

The residents of Turbotville (formerly spelled Tributville) presented a petition for incorporation as a borough to the Northumberland County Court of Quarter Sessions at the April term in 1858. In August Andrew J. Muffly was appointed as commissioner to take depositions in the matter; his report was considered at November 1858 session, and on January 3, 1859, a decree of court was granted for this incorporation. The "Charter for the Incorporation of Turbutville in to a Borough", a handwritten account is noted on three consecutive pages (379-381) in a deed book dated April 6, 1859, located at the Northumberland County Courthouse in Sunbury, Pennsylvania. It is not known when the spelling of the town's name changed.

== Religion ==
The town had churches that were initially associated with the ethnic backgrounds of its residents; they were fundamental to community. Zion Evangelical Lutheran Church on Paradise Street, Trinity United Church of Christ (the name expresses a 20th-century merger of Congregational churches; this was formerly the German Reformed Church) on Church Street, and St. James Lutheran Church (later Holy Spirit Lutheran Church) on Church Street were all associated with ethnic Germans. The Turbotville Baptist Church was originally associated with British Americans. This was formerly located on the south block of Broadway Street. Zion and Trinity still have strong congregations within the borough.

Holy Spirit moved to a new location in Lewis Township, and the former church building is now privately owned. The Turbotville Baptist Church, formerly on Broadway Street, was razed several decades ago. It was replaced in 2009 by a new house. The Turbotville Baptist Church was last used in 1948, the year that the last pastor, Reverend Booth, died. Years later a new Baptist Church, not affiliated with the former Broadway Street church, was erected just east of the borough on State Route 54 in Lewis Township. Now known as Bethel Baptist Church, it has a strong congregation.

== Demographics ==
Historical population
Census	Pop.	Note	%±
1860	380		—
1870	417		9.7%
1880	414		−0.7%
1890	441		6.5%
1900	390		−11.6%
1910	365		−6.4%
1920	415		13.7%
1930	456		9.9%
1940	523		14.7%
1950	518		−1.0%
1960	612		18.1%
1970	627		2.5%
1980	675		7.7%
1990	675		0.0%
2000	691		2.4%
2010	705		2.0%
2020	677		−4.0%
U.S. Decennial Census

As of the census of 2000, there were 691 people, 278 households, and 190 families residing in the borough. The population density was 1,546.9 inhabitants per square mile (597.3/km^{2}). There were 302 housing units at an average density of 676.1 per square mile (261.0/km^{2}). The racial makeup of the borough was 99.13% White, 0.14% African American, 0.14% Native American, and 0.58% from two or more races.

There were 278 households, of which 37.8% had children under the age of 18 living with them, 57.2% were married couples living together, 9.4% had a female householder with no husband present, and 31.3% were non-families; 27.7% of all households were made up of individuals, and 9.7% had someone living alone who was 65 years of age or older. The average household size was 2.49 and the average family size was 3.03.

In the borough the population was spread out, with 28.2% under the age of 18, 7.2% from 18 to 24, 31.5% from 25 to 44, 21.1% from 45 to 64, and 11.9% who were 65 years of age or older. The median age was 34 years. For every 100 females there were 91.9 males. For every 100 females age 18 and over, there were 83.7 males.

The median income for a household in the borough was $40,221, and the median income for a family was $43,750. Males had a median income of $35,875 versus $25,583 for females. The per capita income for the borough was $18,401. About 4.5% of families and 3.8% of the population were below the poverty line, including 1.6% of those under age 18 and 13.5% of those age 65 or over.

== Recreation ==
The Turbotville Community Park is located at the corners of Church and Pine streets. The park includes a picnic pavilion, tennis courts and playground area. The Turbotville Community Hall and Turbotville Train Station are also located at the park.

== Points of interest ==
Notable locations include the Turbotville Auto Museum.

== Education ==
The borough is part of the Warrior Run School District, which encompasses Watsontown, Dewart, McEwensville, Exchange, Lewis Township, Delaware Township, a small portion of Gregg Township in Union County, and other outlying areas. The Warrior Run School District is unique in Pennsylvania because it stretches across three county boundaries: it serves portions of Northumberland, Montour and Union counties. The Turbotville Elementary School is located in the borough, and the Middle School/High School complex is located in Lewis Township on the Susquehanna Trail.

The first Turbotville High School was a wood-framed structure erected on present-day Church Street. This site has been redeveloped for the Turbotville Community Park pavilion. As the building became outdated and was considered too costly to heat, a new brick high school was erected on Pine Street in 1937, built during the Great Depression. That building has undergone several renovations and additions; today it is used as the Turbotville Elementary School. In 1958, a new high school was built on present-day Susquehanna Trail. It was replaced by another high school completed in 1968. The former high school was adapted for use as the Warrior Run Middle School.
