= Hopper-Snyder Homestead =

Historic house in Pennsylvania, United States

- U.S. National Register of Historic Places
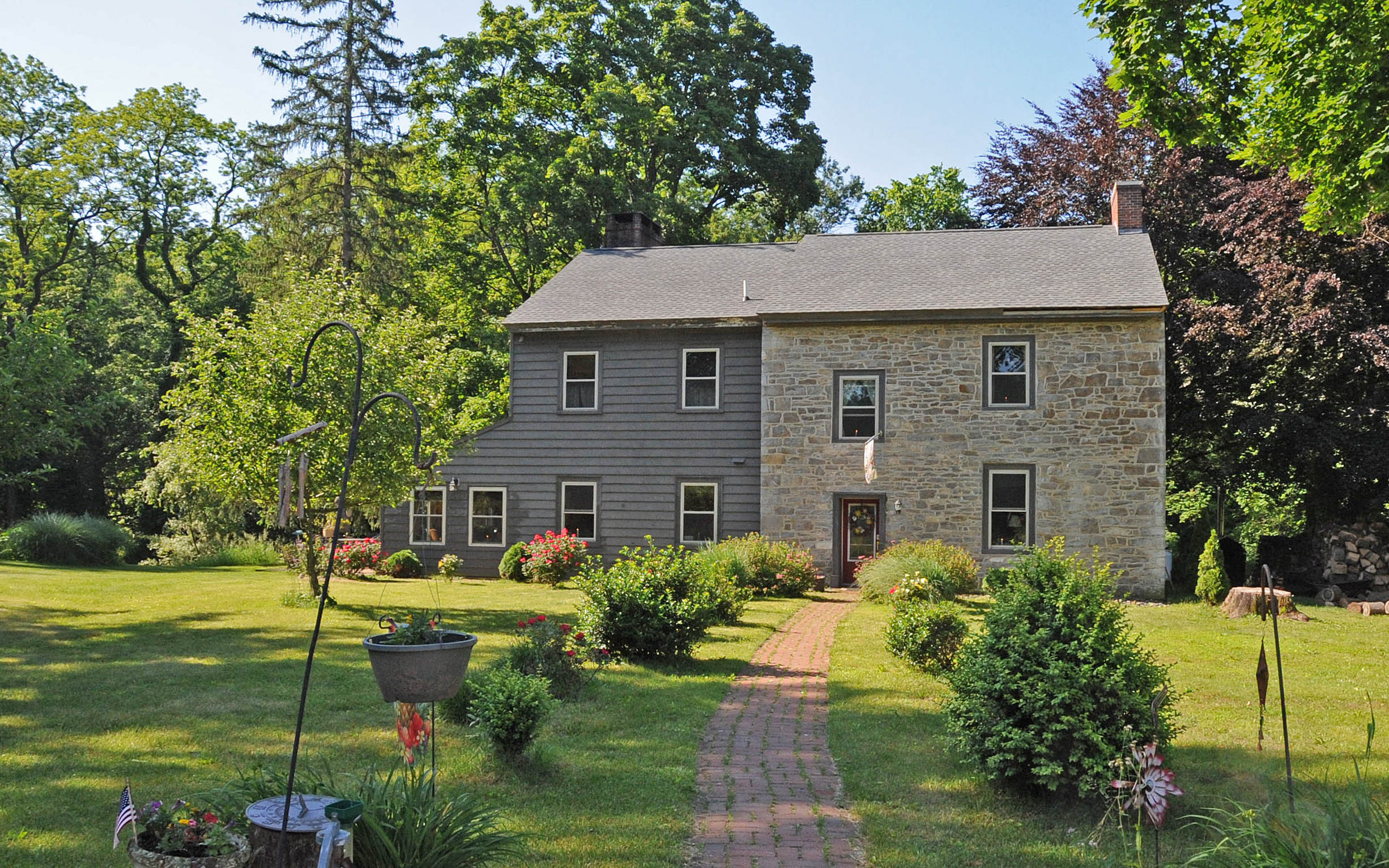

- Location within Pennsylvania Location within the United States
- Location: Northeast of Watsontown off Pennsylvania Route 49061, Delaware Township, Pennsylvania
- Coordinates: 41°5′39″N 76°51′21″W
- Area: 1 acre (0.40 ha)
- Built: c. 1800
- NRHP reference No.: 79002315
- Added to NRHP: July 3, 1979

Hopper-Snyder Homestead is a historic home located at Delaware Township, Northumberland County, Pennsylvania. It was built from 1790 to 1800, and is a 2 1/2-story, five bay by two bay, rectangular stone dwelling with a wood-frame addition. It has a gable roof and interior stone chimney.

It was added to the National Register of Historic Places in 1979.
