= William Kirk House =

Historic house in Pennsylvania, United States

- U.S. National Register of Historic Places
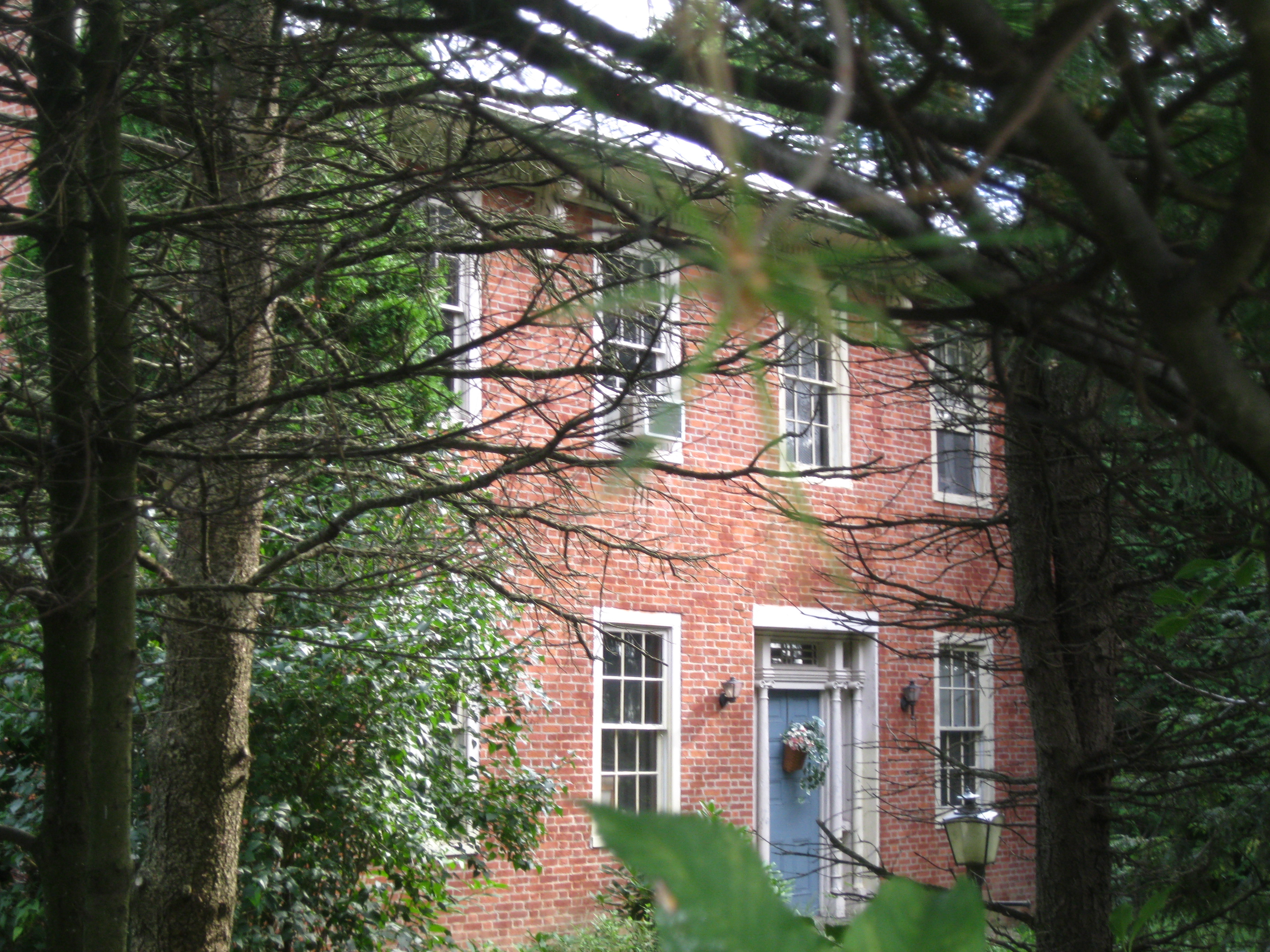
- The house (behind dense foliage) in August 2013

- Location within Pennsylvania Location within the United States
- Location: West of Turbotville, Delaware Township, Pennsylvania
- Coordinates: 41°5′56″N 76°48′43″W
- Area: 1 acre (0.40 ha)
- Built: 1828
- NRHP reference No.: 80003590
- Added to NRHP: December 2, 1980

The William Kirk House, also known as the Warrior Run Farm, is an historic home that is located in Delaware Township, Northumberland County, Pennsylvania, United States.

It was added to the National Register of Historic Places in 1980.

== History and architectural features ==
Built in 1828, this historic structure is a two-story, five-bay, rectangular, brick dwelling with a two-story rear ell. It has a gable roof that dates to circa 1870, with a decorated cornice. The interior has a center hall plan.

Also located on the property is a contributing large barn with a gable roof and silo.
