= Warrior Run Presbyterian Church =

Historic church in Pennsylvania, United States

- U.S. National Register of Historic Places
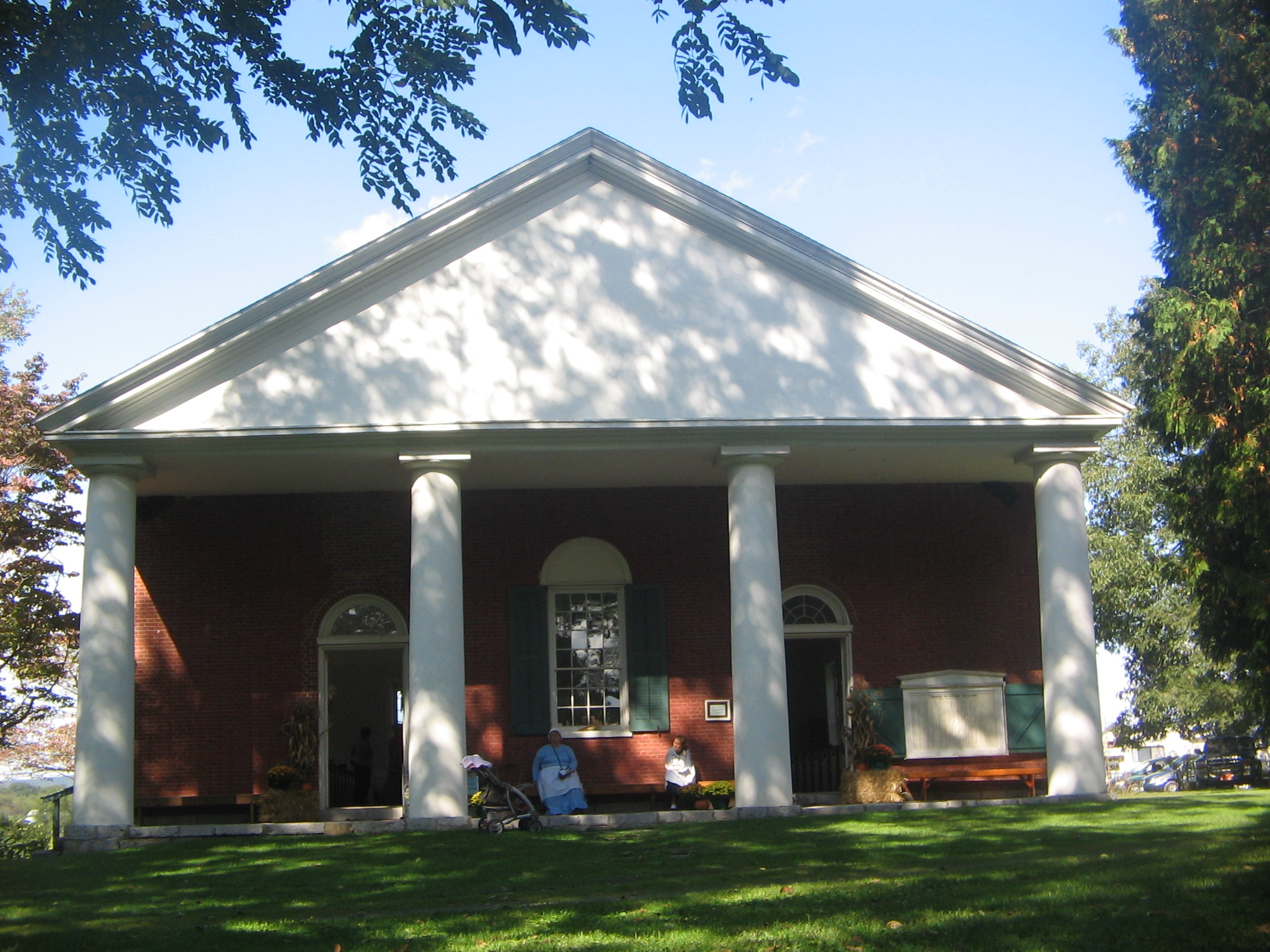
- Warrior Run Presbyterian Church, October 2009

- Location within Pennsylvania Location within the United States
- Location: North of McEwensville on Pennsylvania Route 147, Delaware Township, Pennsylvania
- Coordinates: 41°5′55″N 76°48′25″W
- Area: less than one acre
- Built: 1835
- Architectural style: Greek Revival
- NRHP reference No.: 73001659
- Added to NRHP: April 2, 1973

Warrior Run Presbyterian Church is a historic Presbyterian church located at Delaware Township, Northumberland County, Pennsylvania. It was built in 1835, and is a one-story, red brick building in the Greek Revival style. The front facade features a pedimented portico supported by four Doric order columns. The church was restored in 1947, by the Warrior Run chapter of the Daughters of the American Revolution.

It was added to the National Register of Historic Places in 1973.

== Gallery ==
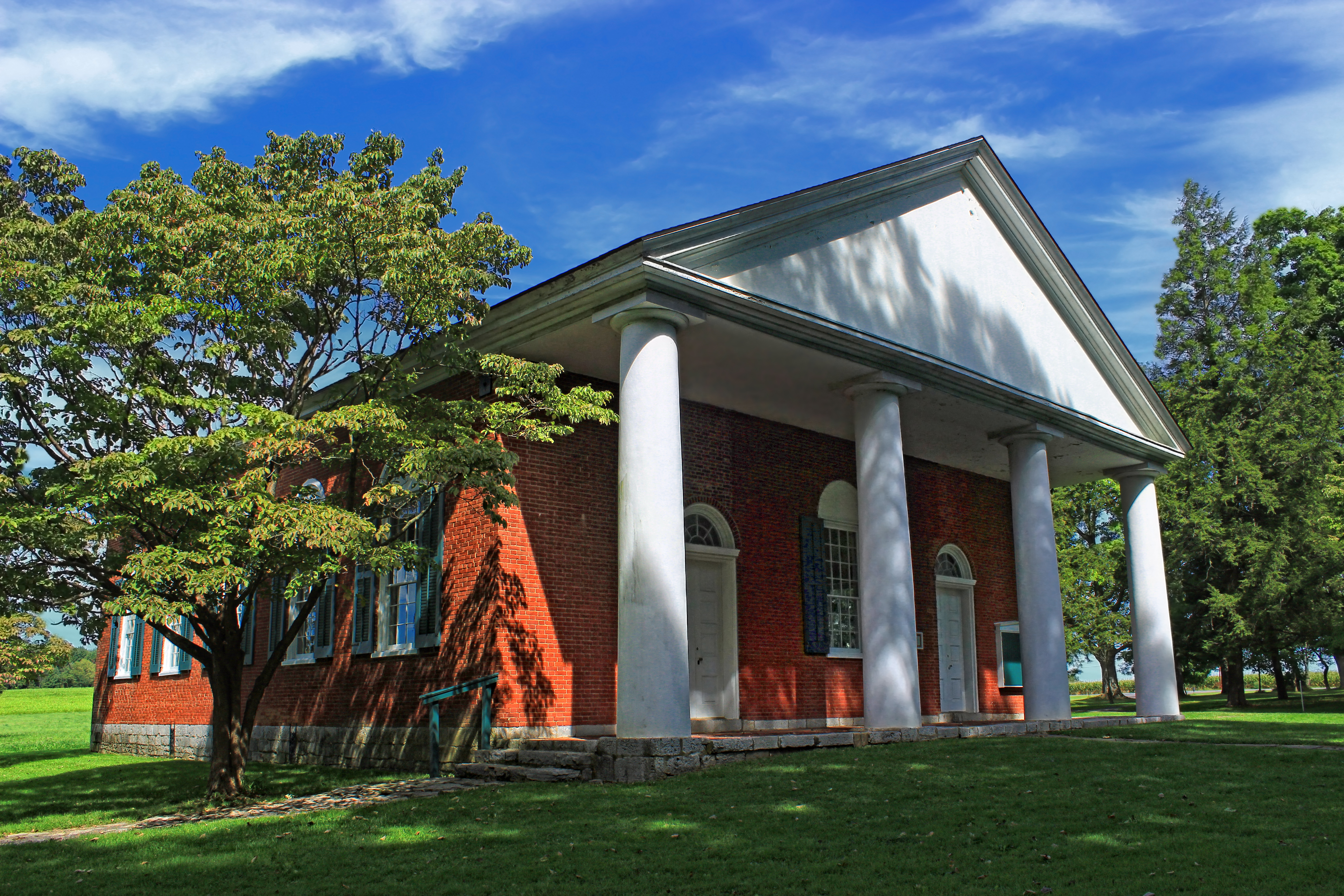

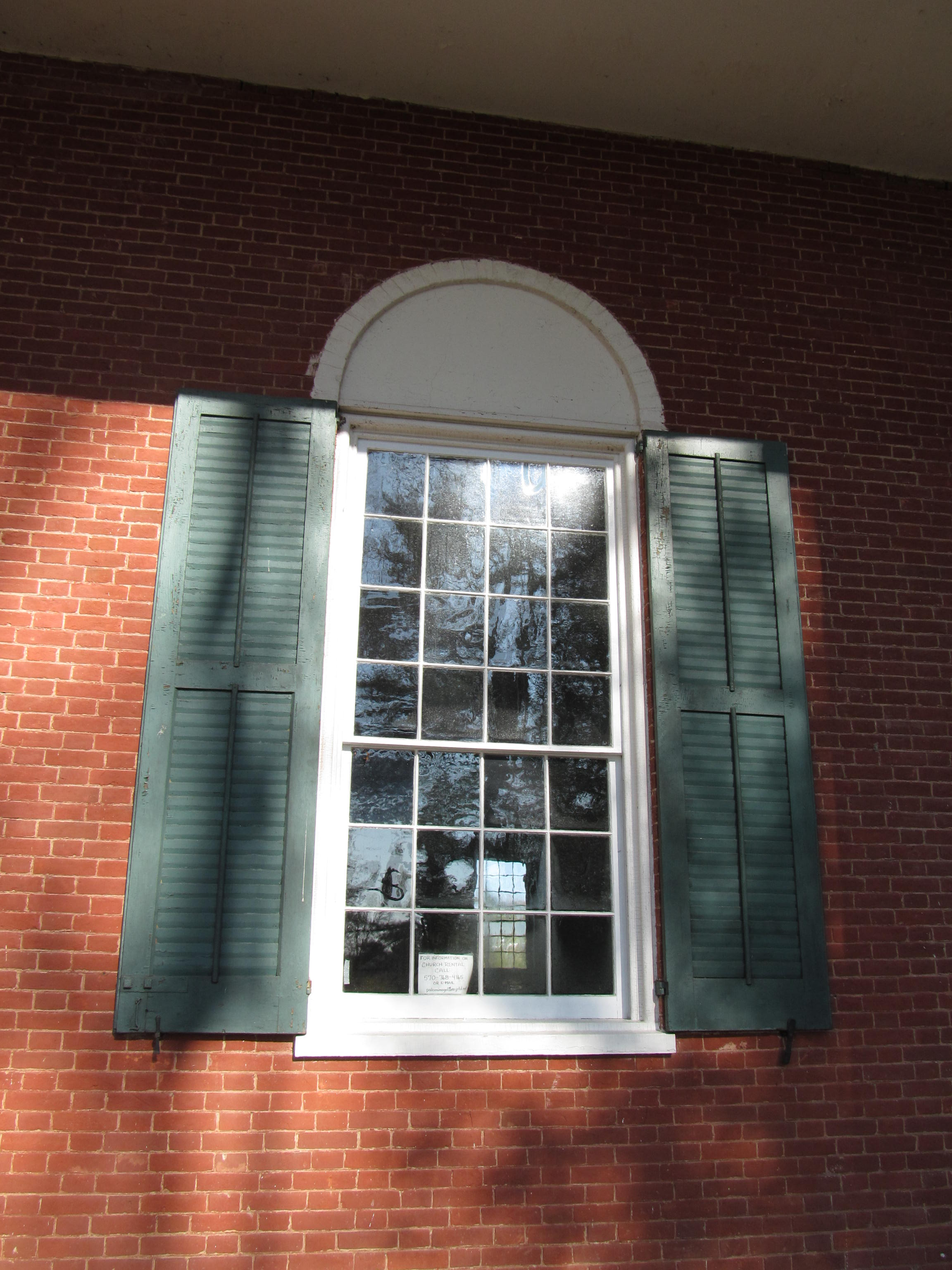

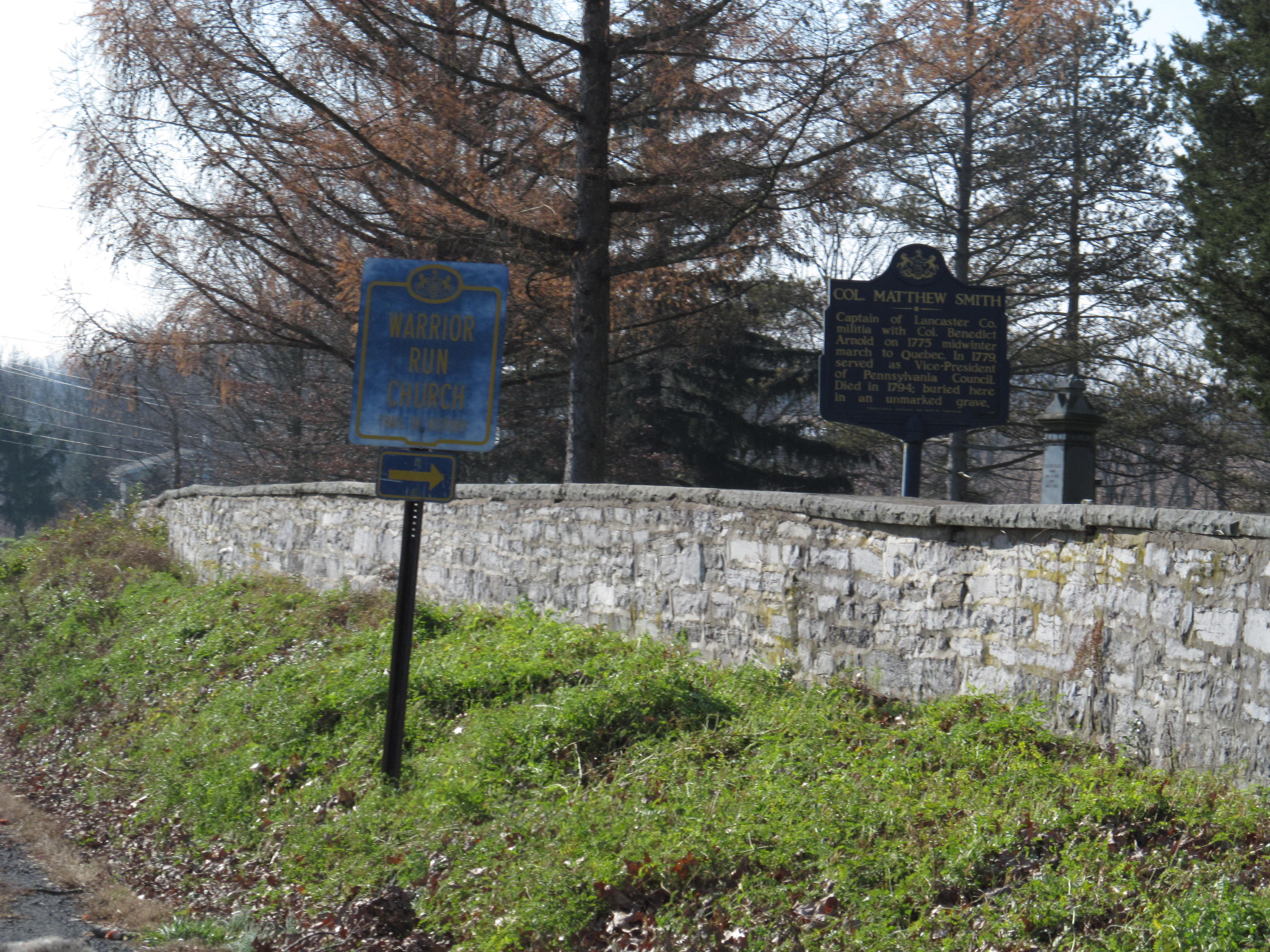
