= McEwensville, Pennsylvania =

Borough in Pennsylvania, US

- Borough
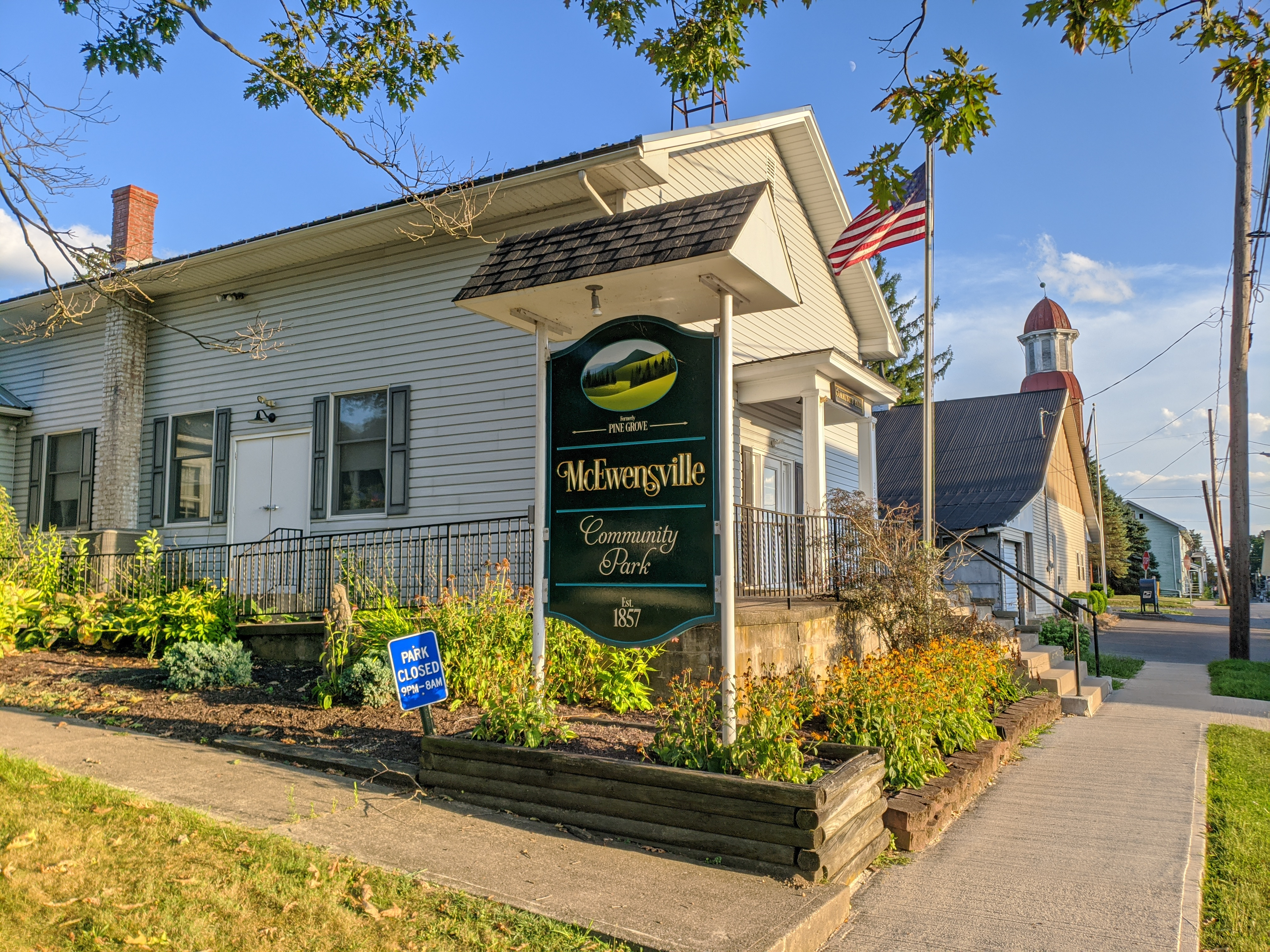
- McEwensville, Pennsylvania

- Location of McEwensville in Northumberland County, Pennsylvania.

- Location on McEwensville in Pennsylvania McEwensville (the United States)
- Coordinates: 41°04′20″N 76°49′07″W
- Country: United States
- State: Pennsylvania
- County: Northumberland
- Settled: 1825
- Incorporated: 1857

Government
  - Type: Borough Council
  - Mayor: Mark Moser

Area
  - Total: 0.12 sq mi (0.30 km^{2})
  - Land: 0.12 sq mi (0.30 km^{2})
  - Water: 0 sq mi (0.00 km^{2})
- Elevation (center of borough): 520 ft (160 m)
- Highest elevation (southeast boundary of borough): 560 ft (170 m)
- Lowest elevation (tributary to Warrior Run): 415 ft (126 m)

Population (2020)
  - Total: 293
  - Density: 2,505/sq mi (967.1/km^{2})
- Time zone: UTC-5 (Eastern (EST))
  - Summer (DST): UTC-4 (EDT)
- Zip code: 17749
- Area code: 570
- FIPS code: 42-46120
- Website: mcewensvilleboro.com

McEwensville is a borough in Northumberland County, Pennsylvania, United States. The population was 298 during the 2020 census.

== Geography ==
McEwensville is located at 41°4′20″N 76°49′7″W (41.072139, -76.818719).

According to the United States Census Bureau, the borough has a total area of 0.1 square miles (0.26 km^{2}), all land.

== Demographics ==
Historical population
Census	Pop.	Note	%±
1860	301		—
1870	269		−10.6%
1880	326		21.2%
1890	262		−19.6%
1900	208		−20.6%
1910	209		0.5%
1920	207		−1.0%
1930	210		1.4%
1940	261		24.3%
1950	297		13.8%
1960	795		167.7%
1970	247		−68.9%
1980	247		0.0%
1990	273		10.5%
2000	314		15.0%
2010	279		−11.1%
2020	293		5.0%

As of the census of 2000, there were 314 people, 116 households, and 83 families residing in the borough. The population density was 3,272.9 inhabitants per square mile (1,263.7/km^{2}). There were 123 housing units at an average density of 1,282.1 per square mile (495.0/km^{2}). The racial makeup of the borough was 98.41% White and 1.59% African American. Hispanic or Latino of any race were 0.32% of the population.

There were 116 households, out of which 38.8% had children under the age of 18 living with them, 62.1% were married couples living together, 6.9% had a female householder with no husband present, and 28.4% were non-families. 21.6% of all households were made up of individuals, and 7.8% had someone living alone who was 65 years of age or older. The average household size was 2.71 and the average family size was 3.07.

In the borough the population was spread out, with 32.8% under the age of 18, 6.4% from 18 to 24, 29.9% from 25 to 44, 16.6% from 45 to 64, and 14.3% who were 65 years of age or older. The median age was 31 years. For every 100 females there were 92.6 males. For every 100 females age 18 and over, there were 95.4 males.

The median income for a household in the borough was $35,500, and the median income for a family was $39,250. Males had a median income of $28,125 versus $21,250 for females. The per capita income for the borough was $15,309. About 4.8% of families and 6.9% of the population were below the poverty line, including 3.2% of those under age 18 and 8.0% of those age 65 or over.

== Education ==
McEwensville is served by the Warrior Run School District..

== Government ==
The mayor of McEwensville is Mark Moser. McEwensville has a five-member borough council that meets the first Wednesday of each month at 7:00 PM unless otherwise noted. Council members are:

Mayor	Mark Moser
President	Chris Walker
Vice Pres.	Fred Wesner
Secy/Treas	Rachael Sossamon
Council Person	Greg Yost
Council Person	Michael Romano
Council Person	Faye Arndt Shaffer
Solicitor	Robert Benion
Tax Collector	Jean Kline Smith
Caretaker	[Vacant]
Code Officer	CKCOG
Permit Official	CKCOG
