= Watsontown, Pennsylvania =

Borough in Pennsylvania, US

- Borough
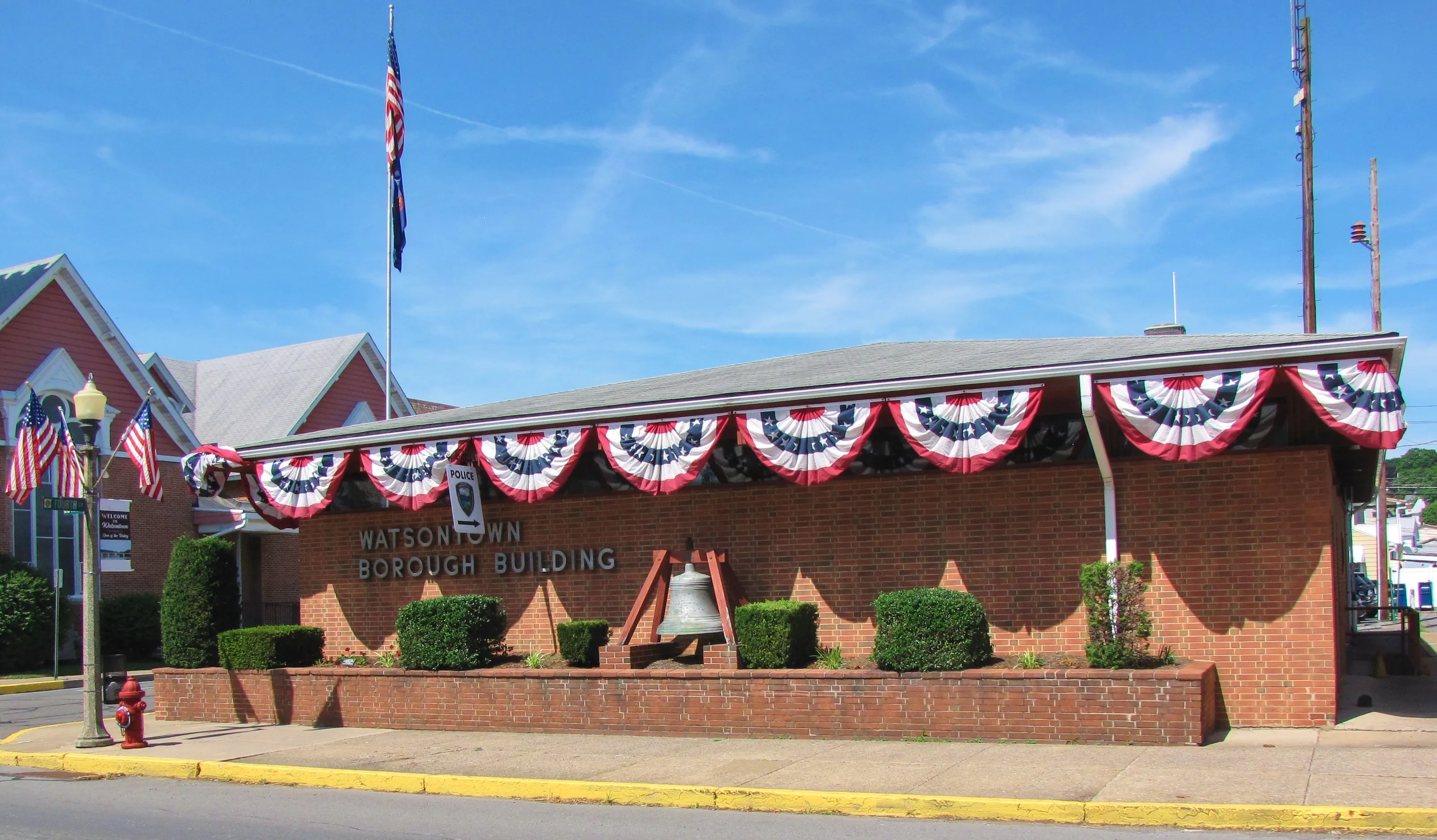
- Watsontown Borough Building

- Location of Watsontown in Northumberland County, Pennsylvania.

- Location within the U.S. state of Pennsylvania Watsontown (the United States)
- Coordinates: 41°05′07″N 76°51′48″W
- Country: United States
- State: Pennsylvania
- County: Northumberland
- Settled: 1794
- Incorporated (borough): 1858

Area
  - Total: 0.93 sq mi (2.42 km^{2})
  - Land: 0.71 sq mi (1.84 km^{2})
  - Water: 0.22 sq mi (0.58 km^{2})
- Elevation (benchmark at center of borough): 484 ft (148 m)
- Highest elevation (eastern end of borough by cemetery): 590 ft (180 m)
- Lowest elevation (West Branch Susquehanna River): 450 ft (140 m)

Population (2020)
  - Total: 2,237
  - Density: 3,153.7/sq mi (1,217.65/km^{2})
- Time zone: Eastern (EST)
  - Summer (DST): EDT
- ZIP code: 17777
- Area codes: 570 and 272
- FIPS code: 42-81616
- Website: Borough website

Watsontown is a borough in Northumberland County, Pennsylvania, United States. The population was 2,237 at the 2020 census. It was named for John Watson, an early settler.

== History ==
Land in the Watsontown area was first purchased by John Watson in 1792. The borough's post office was opened in 1828. There was a racetrack in Watsontown from 1830 to 1840. Railroad tracks first reached the borough in 1854. A sawmill was built in the area in 1856. Watsontown was a part of Turbot Township until its incorporation in 1867.

Watsontown was an important part of a transportation network that included roads, railroads, and canals along the Susquehanna River. Watsontown served as a stop along the Underground Railroad for slaves escaping to Canada. Many businesses were located here because of this. Part of the old canal and the tow path used by mules at the time is visible along the river.

== Geography ==
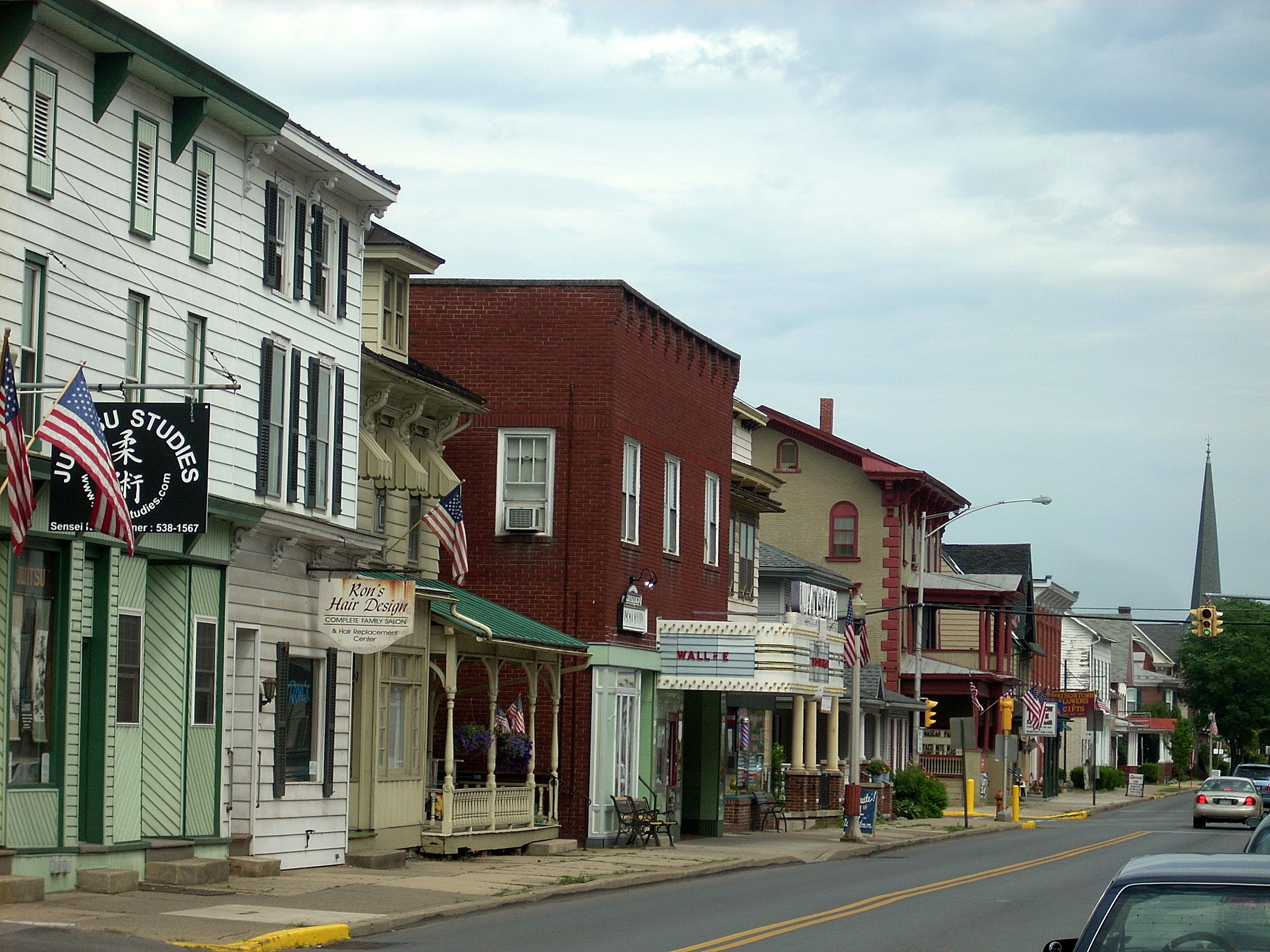
Main Street

According to the United States Census Bureau, the borough has a total area of 0.9 square miles (2.3 km^{2}), of which 0.7 square miles (1.8 km^{2}) is land and 0.2 square miles (0.52 km^{2}) (24.47%) is water.

Watsontown's terrain is almost entirely flat except for a hill in the eastern part of the borough. The borough's land is mostly residential, with some forest and industrial areas. The West Branch Susquehanna River borders the western part of Watsontown. The borough is served by Pennsylvania Route 44 and Pennsylvania Route 405.

== Demographics ==
Historical population
Census	Pop.	Note	%±
1870	1,181		—
1880	1,481		25.4%
1890	2,157		45.6%
1900	1,898		−12.0%
1910	1,950		2.7%
1920	2,153		10.4%
1930	2,248		4.4%
1940	2,282		1.5%
1950	2,327		2.0%
1960	2,431		4.5%
1970	2,514		3.4%
1980	2,366		−5.9%
1990	2,310		−2.4%
2000	2,255		−2.4%
2010	2,351		4.3%
2020	2,237		−4.8%

As of the census of 2000, there were 2,254 people, 967 households, and 591 families residing in the borough. The population density was 3,161.9 inhabitants per square mile (1,220.8/km^{2}). There were 1,017 housing units at an average density of 1,426.0 per square mile (550.6/km^{2}). The racial makeup of the borough was 98.66% White, 0.40% African American, 0.18% Native American, 0.13% Asian, 0.13% Pacific Islander, 0.09% from other races, and 0.40% from two or more races. Hispanic or Latino of any race were 0.35% of the population. There are currently 8 registered sex offenders residing within the borough.

There were 967 households, out of which 25.1% had children under the age of 18 living with them, 48.5% were married couples living together, 10.1% had a female householder with no husband present, and 38.8% were non-families. 33.2% of all households were made up of individuals, and 15.9% had someone living alone who was 65 years of age or older. The average household size was 2.21 and the average family size was 2.81.

In the borough the population was spread out, with 21.1% under the age of 18, 7.2% from 18 to 24, 27.3% from 25 to 44, 23.1% from 45 to 64, and 21.3% who were 65 years of age or older. The median age was 41 years. For every 100 females, there were 79.3 males. For every 100 females age 18 and over, there were 79.6 males.

The median income for a household in the borough was $31,094, and the median income for a family was $37,065. Males had a median income of $30,648 versus $20,972 for females. The per capita income for the borough was $16,110. About 8.4% of families and 11.2% of the population were below the poverty line, including 15.7% of those under age 18 and 10.6% of those age 65 or over.

== Education ==
The school district is Warrior Run School District.

== Arts and culture ==
The Watsontown River Bridge is listed on the National Register of Historic Places.

The Watsontown Theater operated from 1940 to 2009.

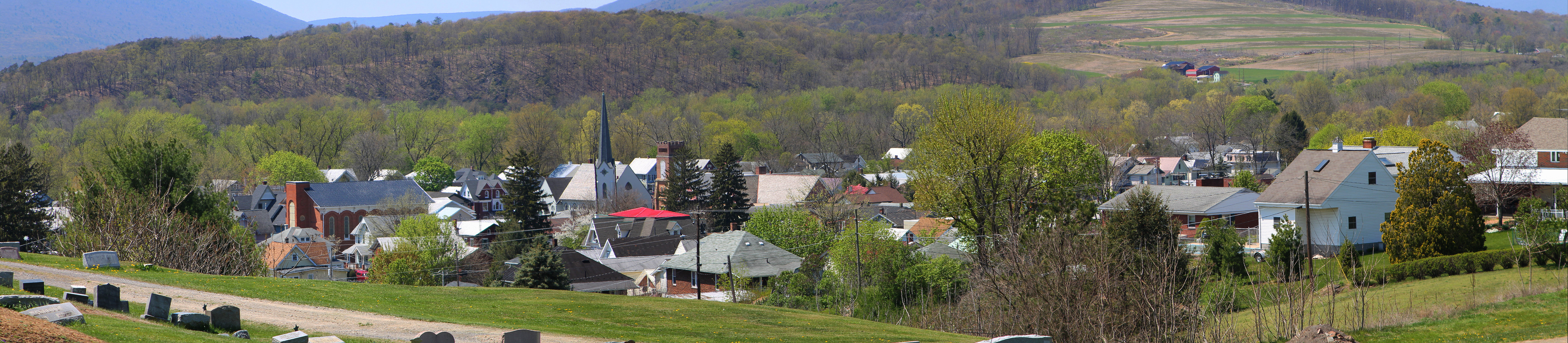
Panorama from Watsontown Cemetery
