= Limestone Township, Montour County, Pennsylvania =

Township in Pennsylvania, United States

Coordinates: 41°04′00″N 76°42′59″W

Limestone Township, Mountour County, Pennsylvania
- Township
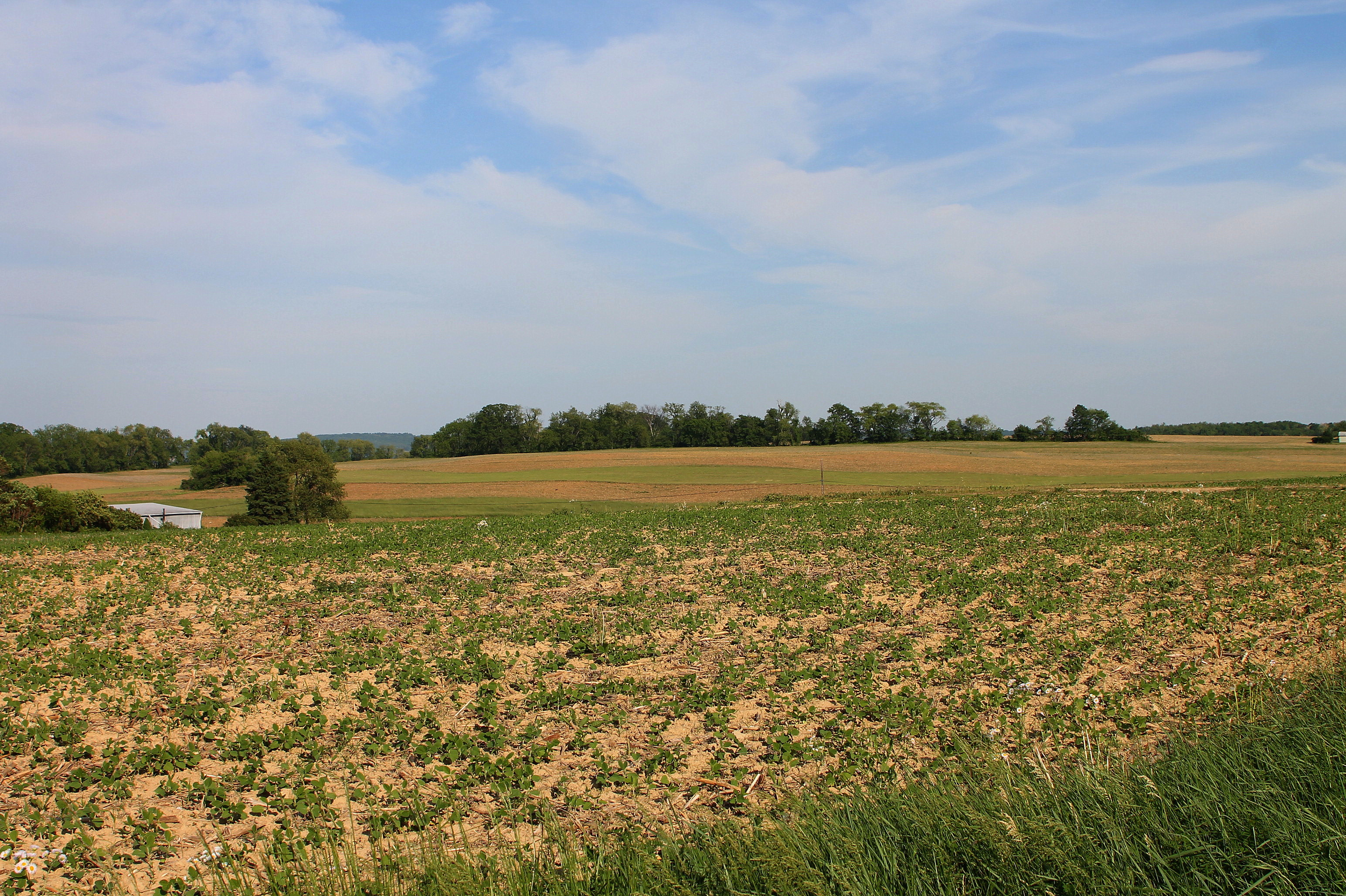
- Scenery of Limestone Township, Montour County, Pennsylvania from Bush Road

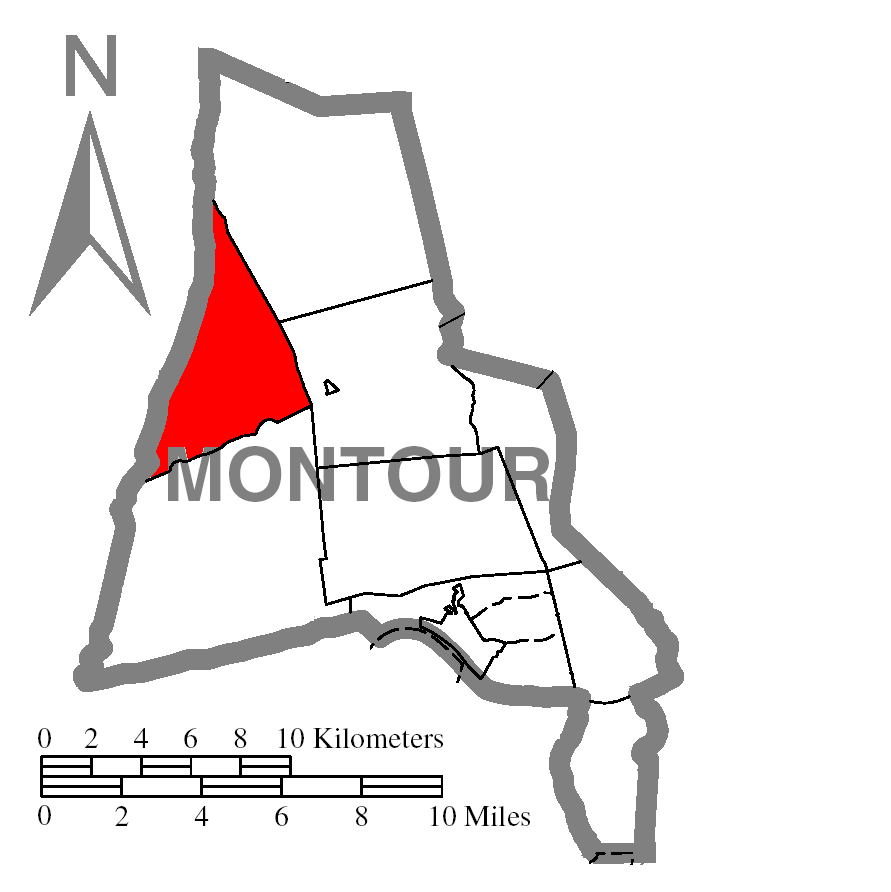
- Map of Montour County, Pennsylvania Highlighting Limestone Township

- Map of Montour County, Pennsylvania
- Country: United States
- State: Pennsylvania
- County: Montour
- Settled: 1790
- Incorporated: 1816

Area
  - Total: 13.38 sq mi (34.66 km^{2})
  - Land: 13.35 sq mi (34.57 km^{2})
  - Water: 0.035 sq mi (0.09 km^{2})

Population (2020)
  - Total: 1,002 ▼
  - Estimate (2021): 995
  - Density: 83.2/sq mi (32.13/km^{2})
- FIPS code: 42-093-43360
- Website: https://limestone-township.org/

Limestone Township is a township in Montour County, Pennsylvania, United States. Within it lays the small community of Limestoneville. Its name stems from the ample supplies of Limestone quarried at multiple locations in the area.

== Geography ==
According to the United States Census Bureau, the township has a total area of 13.4 square miles (34.7 km^{2}), all of it land. A tiny tributary stream of the Susquehanna River, Limestone Run, starts here.

== Demographics ==
Historical population
Census	Pop.	Note	%±
2000	1,004		—
2010	1,066		6.2%
2020	1,002		−6.0%
2021 (est.)	995		−0.7%
U.S. Decennial Census

As of the census of 2000, there were 1,004 people, 335 households, and 277 families residing in the township.

The population density was 74.9 inhabitants per square mile (28.9/km^{2}). There were 346 housing units at an average density of 25.8 per square mile (10.0/km^{2}).

The racial makeup of the township was 98.31% White, 0.50% African American, 0.20% from other races, and 1.00% from two or more races. Hispanic or Latino of any race were 0.30% of the population.

There were 335 households, out of which 37.0% had children under the age of eighteen living with them; 74.0% were married couples living together, 4.8% had a female householder with no husband present, and 17.3% were non-families. 14.6% of all households were made up of individuals, and 7.8% had someone living alone who was sixty-five years of age or older.

The average household size was 3.00 and the average family size was 3.34.

In the township, the population was spread out with 30.1% under the age of eighteen, 7.9% aged eighteen to twenty-four, 27.2% aged twenty-five to forty-four, 22.8% aged forty-five to sixty-four, and 12.1% who were sixty-five years of age or older. The median age was thirty-six years.

For every one hundred females, there were 98.8 males. For every one hundred females who were aged eighteen and older, there were 98.9 males.

The median income for a household in the township was $41,369, and the median income for a family was $43,906. Males had a median income of $35,652 compared with that of $22,262 for females.

The per capita income for the township was $16,426.

Roughly 8.9% of families and 11.4% of the population were living below the poverty line, including 18.2% of those who were under the age of eighteen and 6.3% of those who were aged sixty-five or older.
