= Delaware Township, Northumberland County, Pennsylvania =

Township in Pennsylvania, US

Coordinates: 41°08′00″N 76°52′35″W

- Township
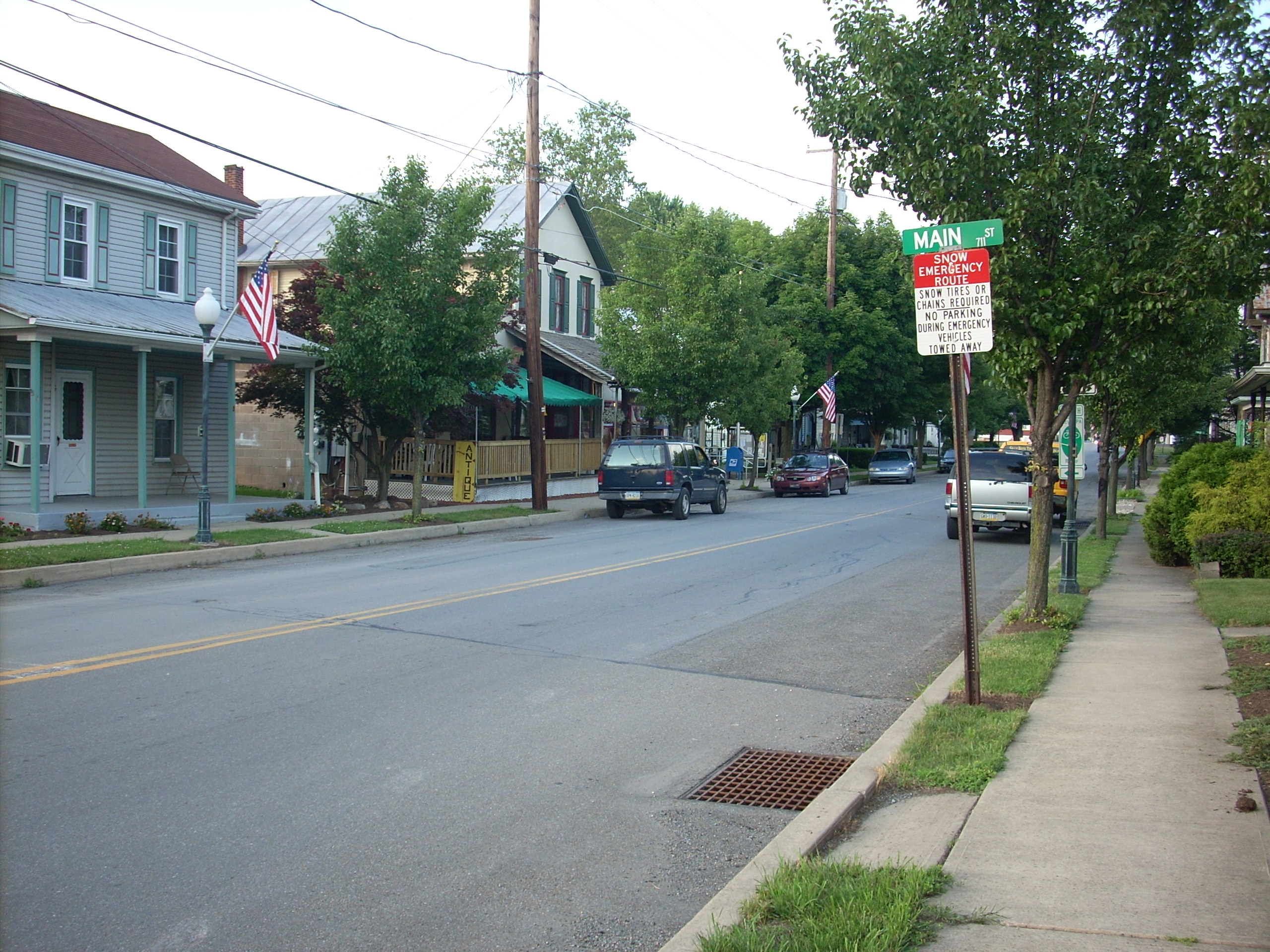
- Dewart: a village in Delaware Township

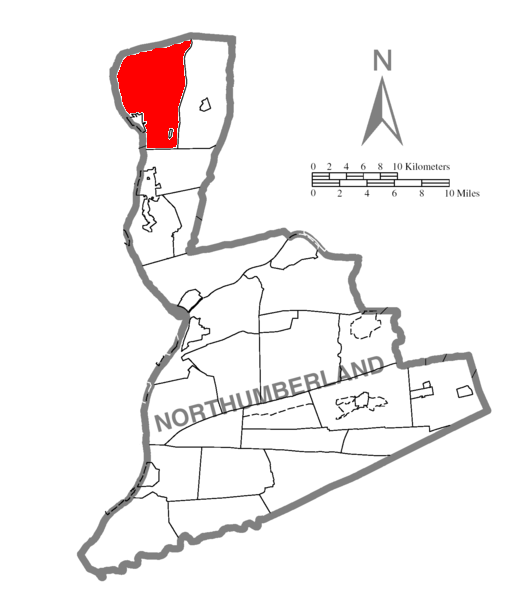
- Map of Northumberland County, Pennsylvania highlighting Delaware Township

- Map of Northumberland County, Pennsylvania
- Country: United States
- State: Pennsylvania
- County: Northumberland
- Settled: 1774
- Incorporated: 1843

Government
  - Type: Board of Supervisors

Area
  - Total: 31.34 sq mi (81.17 km^{2})
  - Land: 30.25 sq mi (78.36 km^{2})
  - Water: 1.08 sq mi (2.81 km^{2})

Population (2020)
  - Total: 4,303 ▼
  - Estimate (2022): 4,274
  - Density: 146.0/sq mi (56.38/km^{2})
- Time zone: UTC-5 (Eastern (EST))
  - Summer (DST): UTC-4 (EDT)
- Area code: 570
- FIPS code: 42-097-18696
- Website: delawaretownship.org

Delaware Township is a township in Northumberland County, Pennsylvania, United States. The population at the 2020 Census was 4,303, a decrease from the figure of 4,489 tabulated in 2010.

== History ==
The Allenwood River Bridge, Hopper-Snyder Homestead, William Kirk House, and Warrior Run Presbyterian Church are listed on the National Register of Historic Places.

== Geography ==
According to the United States Census Bureau, the township has a total area of 31.5 square miles (82 km^{2}), of which 30.4 square miles (79 km^{2}) is land and 1.0 square mile (2.6 km^{2}) (3.21%) is water. It contains the census-designated place of Dewart.

== Demographics ==
Historical population
Census	Pop.	Note	%±
2010	4,489		—
2020	4,303		−4.1%
2022 (est.)	4,274		−0.7%
U.S. Decennial Census

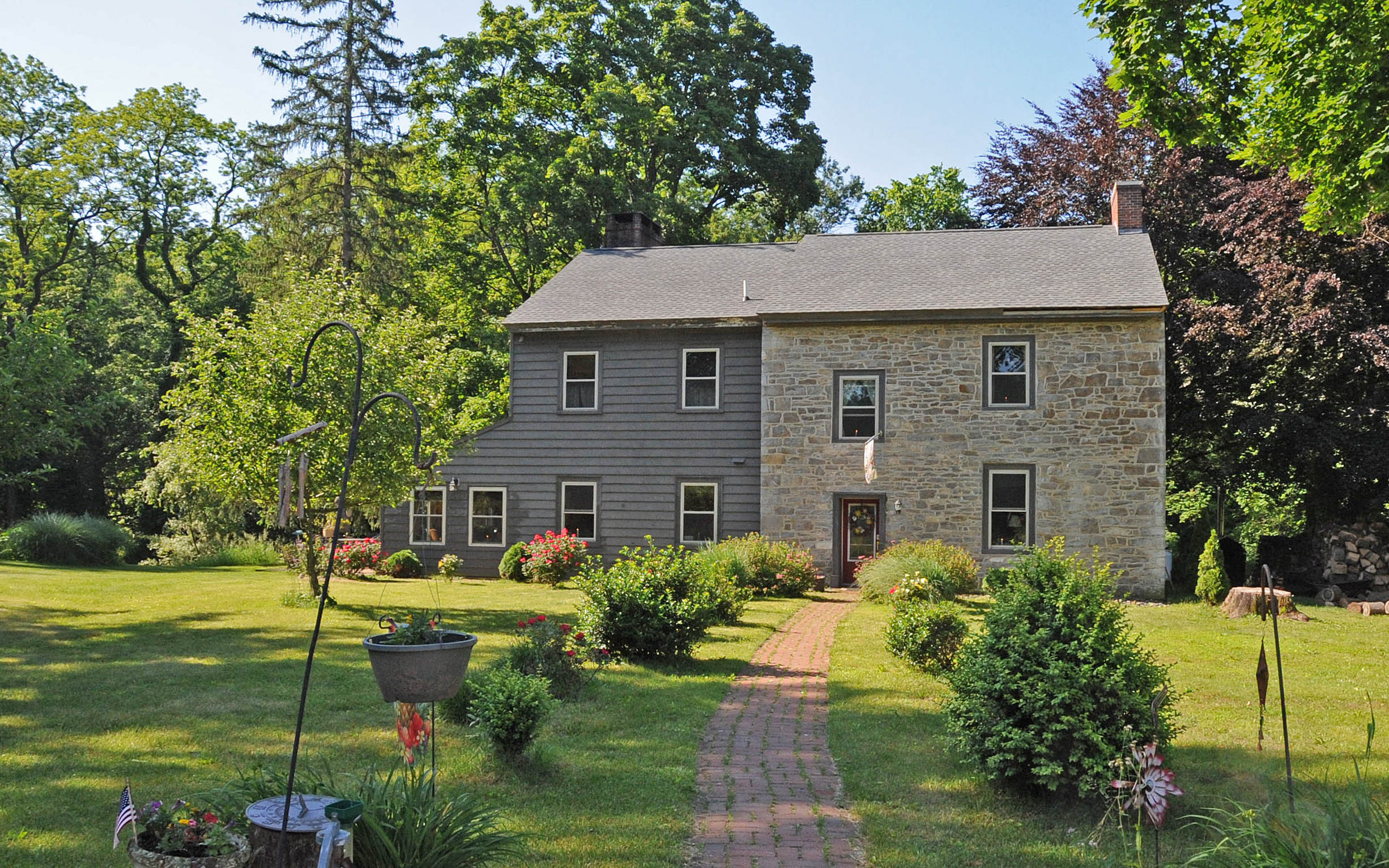
Hopper-Snyder Homestead

As of the census of 2000, there were 4,341 people, 1,678 households, and 1,241 families residing in the township. The population density was 142.6 inhabitants per square mile (55.1/km^{2}). There were 1,765 housing units at an average density of 58.0 per square mile (22.4/km^{2}). The racial makeup of the township was 98.80% White, 0.28% African American, 0.18% Native American, 0.23% Asian, 0.02% Pacific Islander, 0.14% from other races, and 0.35% from two or more races. Hispanic or Latino of any race were 0.53% of the population.

There were 1,678 households, out of which 31.6% had children under the age of 18 living with them, 63.1% were married couples living together, 7.1% had a female householder with no husband present, and 26.0% were non-families. 21.5% of all households were made up of individuals, and 9.8% had someone living alone who was 65 years of age or older. The average household size was 2.58 and the average family size was 2.98.

In the township the population was spread out, with 24.5% under the age of 18, 7.0% from 18 to 24, 29.1% from 25 to 44, 25.3% from 45 to 64, and 14.2% who were 65 years of age or older. The median age was 39 years. For every 100 females, there were 96.9 males. For every 100 females age 18 and over, there were 94.7 males.

The median income for a household in the township was $39,219, and the median income for a family was $45,950. Males had a median income of $30,138 versus $21,417 for females. The per capita income for the township was $17,442. About 7.0% of families and 10.7% of the population were below the poverty line, including 12.2% of those under age 18 and 16.1% of those age 65 or over.
