= Bloomsburg–Berwick metropolitan area =

Metropolitan area in Pennsylvania, United States

Coordinates: 41°00′N 76°20′W

Bloomsburg–Berwick Area
- Micropolitan Statistical Area
- Bloomsburg–Berwick, PA; Micropolitan Statistical Area
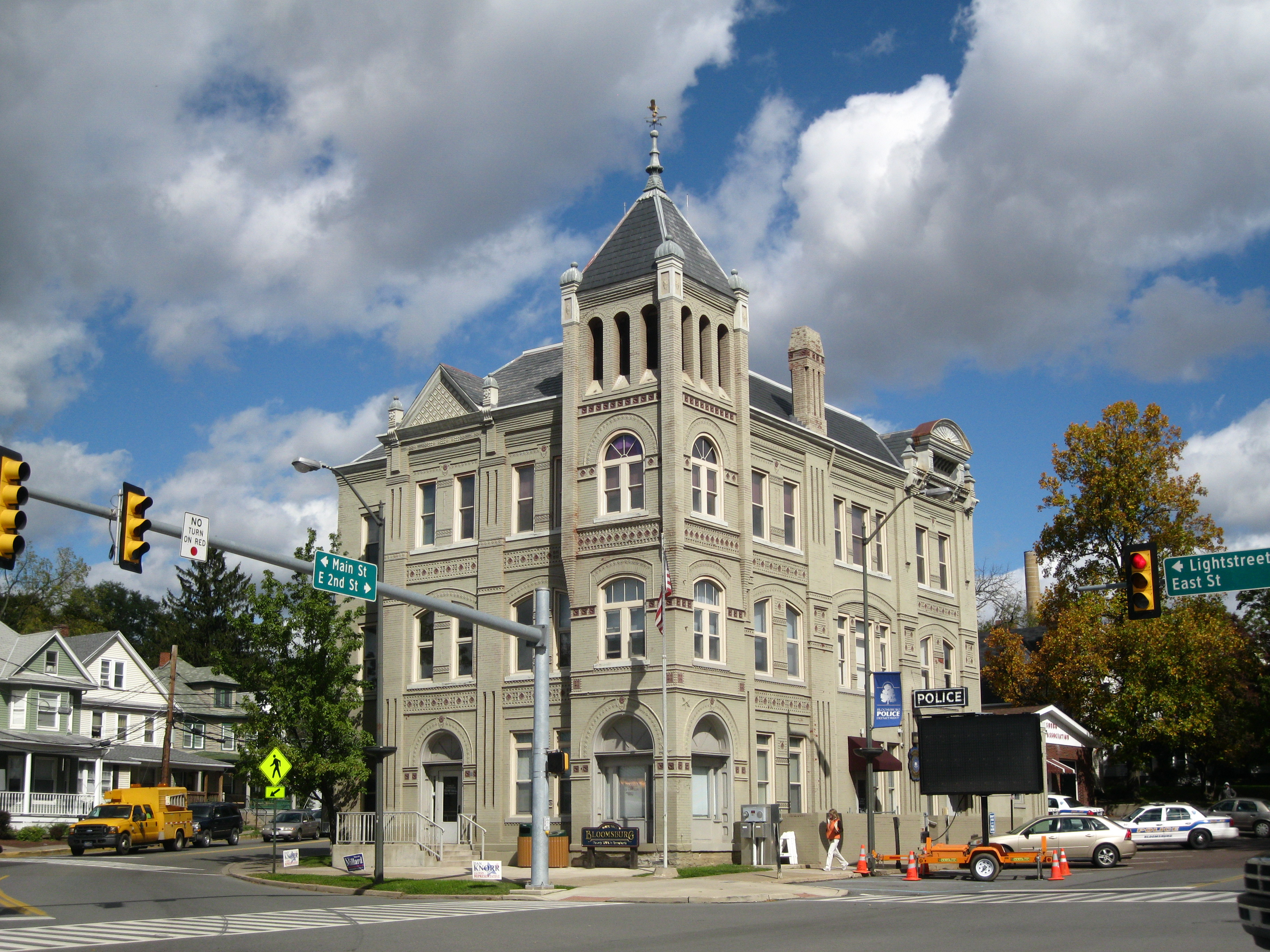
- Bloomsburg Town Hall
Interactive Map of Bloomsburg–Berwick–Sunbury
Combined Statistical Area
Bloomsburg–Berwick, PA μSA
- Country: United States
- State: Pennsylvania
- Largest town: Bloomsburg
- Other borough: Berwick

Area
  - Total: 490 sq mi (1,300 km^{2})

Population (2020)
  - Total: 82,863
  - Density: 170/sq mi (65/km^{2})

GDP
  - Total: $19.936 billion (2022)
- Time zone: UTC-5 (EST)
  - Summer (DST): UTC-4 (EDT)

The Bloomsburg–Berwick Micropolitan Statistical Area (μSA), as defined by the United States Census Bureau, is an area consisting of Columbia County in Pennsylvania, anchored by the town of Bloomsburg and the borough of Berwick. Prior to the re-delineation of census statistical areas effective July 1, 2023, the area also included Montour County, which was moved to the adjacent Sunbury Micropolitan Area. As of the 2020 census, the μSA had a population of 82,863.

== Counties ==
- Columbia

== Communities ==
=== Towns ===
- Bloomsburg (Principal city)

=== Boroughs ===
- Ashland (partial)
- Benton
- Berwick (Principal city)
- Briar Creek
- Catawissa
- Centralia
- Danville
- Millville
- Orangeville
- Stillwater
- Washingtonville

=== Census-designated places ===
Note: All census-designated places are unincorporated.

- Almedia
- Aristes
- Buckhorn
- Espy
- Eyers Grove
- Fernville
- Foundryville
- Iola
- Jamison City
- Jerseytown
- Jonestown
- Lightstreet
- Lime Ridge
- Locustdale
- Mainville
- Mifflinville
- Numidia
- Rohrsburg
- Rupert
- Slabtown
- Waller
- Wilburton Number One
- Wilburton Number Two

== Townships ==
- Beaver Township
- Benton Township
- Briar Creek Township
- Catawissa Township
- Cleveland Township
- Conyngham Township
- Fishing Creek Township
- Franklin Township
- Greenwood Township
- Hemlock Township
- Jackson Township
- Locust Township
- Madison Township
- Main Township
- Mifflin Township
- Montour Township
- Mount Pleasant Township
- North Centre Township
- Orange Township
- Pine Township
- Roaring Creek Township
- Scott Township
- South Centre Township
- Sugarloaf Township

== Combined Statistical Area (CSA) ==
The United States Office of Management and Budget has also designated the area the Bloomsburg–Berwick–Sunbury, PA Combined Statistical Area (CSA). As of the 2010 U.S. census the combined area ranked 8th most populous in the State of Pennsylvania and the 115th most populous in the United States with a population of 264,739.

=== Counties in Combined Statistical Area ===
- Columbia
- Montour
- Northumberland
- Snyder
- Union

== Demographics ==
As of the census of 2000, there were 82,387 people, 32,000 households, and 21,385 families residing within the MSA. The racial makeup of the μSA was 97.38% White, 0.85% African American, 0.13% Native American, 0.69% Asian, 0.03% Pacific Islander, 0.34% from other races, and 0.58% from two or more races. Hispanic or Latino of any race were 0.94% of the population.

The median income for a household in the MSA was $36,085, and the median income for a family was $43,311. Males had a median income of $31,442 versus $22,707 for females. The per capita income for the μSA was $22,707.

== See also ==
- Pennsylvania census statistical areas
