= Mifflinville, Pennsylvania =

Unincorporated community in Pennsylvania, US

- Census-designated place
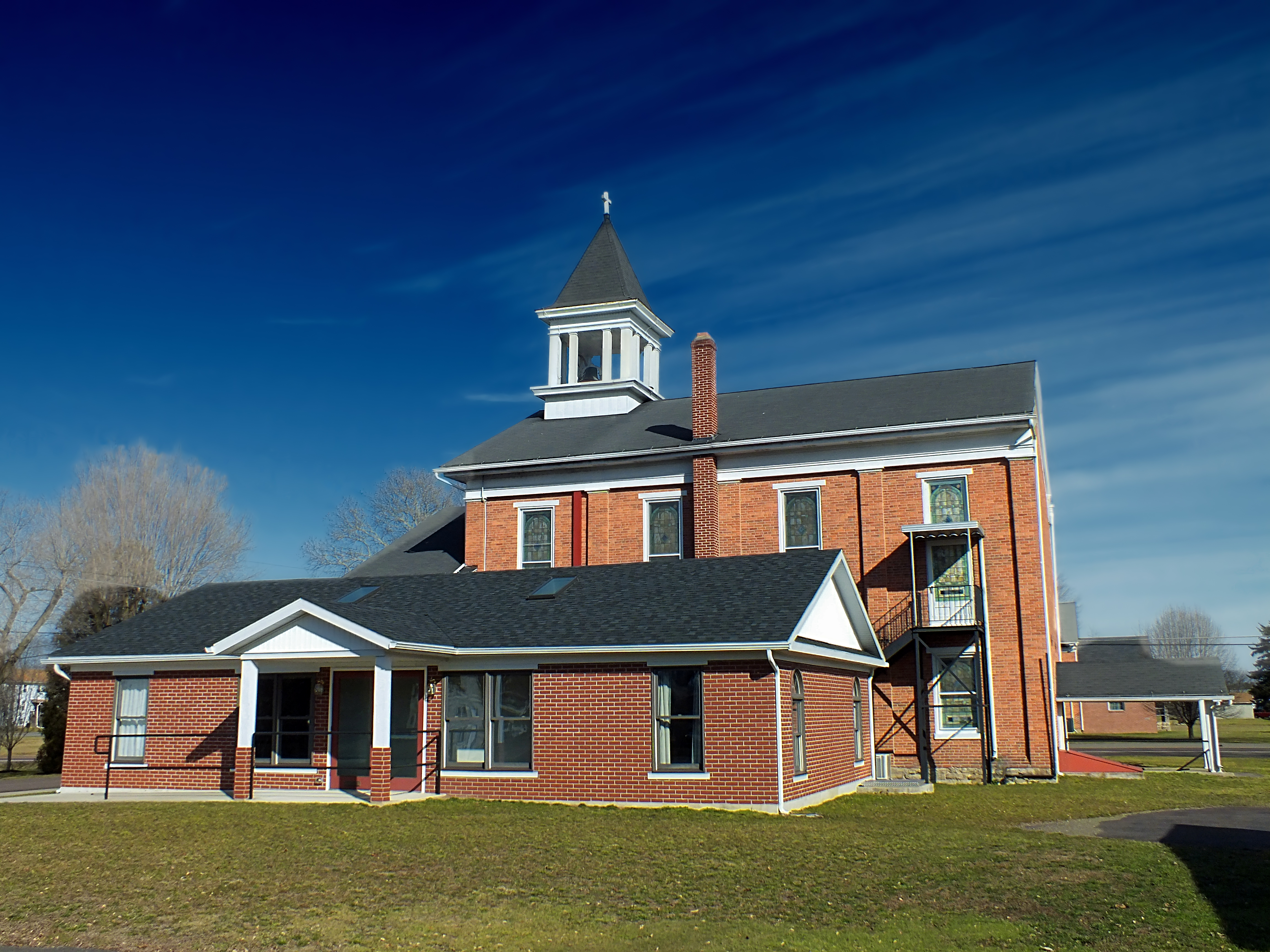
- Mifflinville United Methodist Church

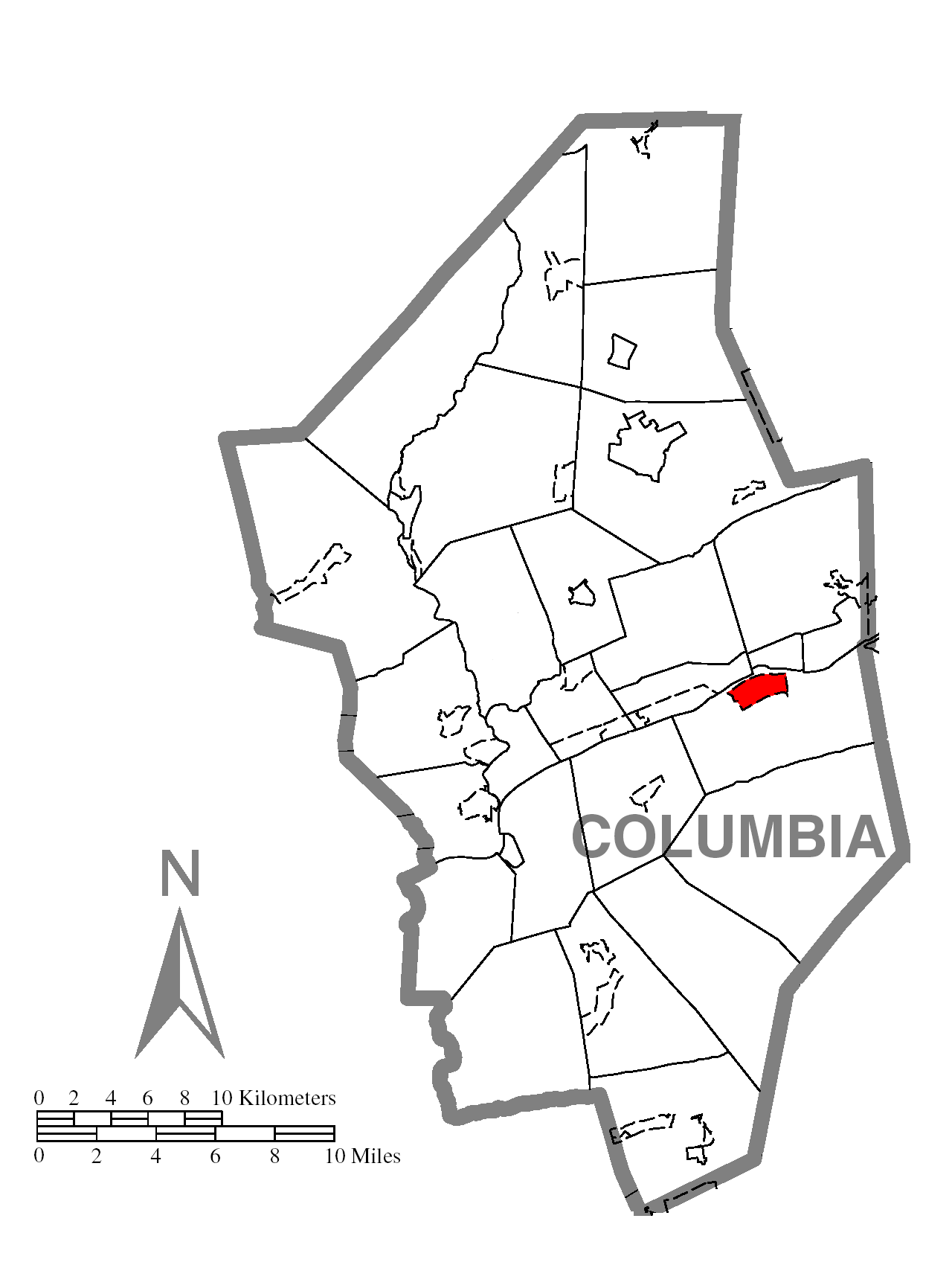
- Location within Columbia County

- Location within the U.S. state of Pennsylvania Mifflinville (the United States)
- Coordinates: 41°1′56″N 76°18′28″W
- Country: United States
- State: Pennsylvania
- County: Columbia
- Township: Mifflin

Area
  - Total: 1.38 sq mi (3.57 km^{2})
  - Land: 1.37 sq mi (3.55 km^{2})
  - Water: 0.0077 sq mi (0.02 km^{2})
- Elevation: 510 ft (160 m)

Population (2020)
  - Total: 1,233
  - Density: 900/sq mi (347.5/km^{2})
- Time zone: UTC-5 (Eastern (EST))
  - Summer (DST): UTC-4 (EDT)
- ZIP Code: 18631
- FIPS code: 42-49312
- GNIS feature ID: 1213288

Mifflinville is an unincorporated community and census-designated place (CDP) in Columbia County, Pennsylvania, United States. It is part of Northeastern Pennsylvania. The population was 1,233 at the 2020 census. It is part of the Bloomsburg-Berwick micropolitan area.

== Geography ==
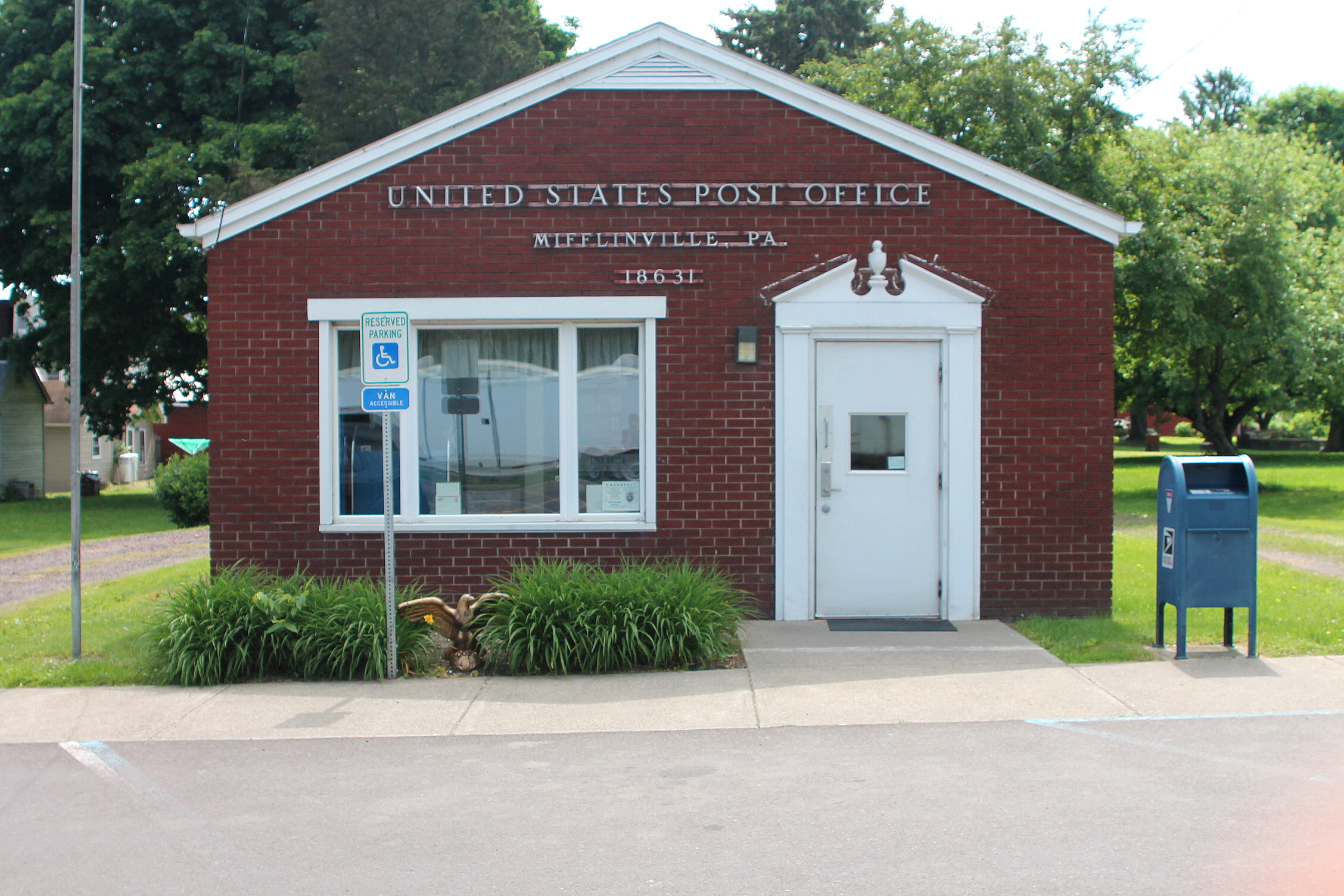
The post office of Mifflinville

Mifflinville is located in east-central Columbia County at 41°1′43″N 76°18′26″W (41.028617, -76.307175), in the northern part of Mifflin Township.

According to the U.S. Census Bureau, Mifflinville has a total area of 1.38 square miles (3.57 km^{2}), of which 1.37 square miles (3.55 km^{2}) is land and 0.01 square miles (0.02 km^{2}), or 0.49%, is water. Mifflinville is on the south side of the Susquehanna River, several miles downriver (southwest) from Berwick. The eastern part of Mifflinville is mostly farmland, while the western section is residential. Mifflinville's terrain is almost entirely flat.

Interstate 80 passes just southwest of Mifflinville, with access from Exit 242 (Pennsylvania Route 339). PA 339 leads east 5 miles (8 km) to Nescopeck, from where it is another mile north across the Susquehanna to Berwick. Bloomsburg, the Columbia County seat, is 9 miles (14 km) to the west via either I-80 or U.S. Route 11.

== Demographics ==
Historical population
Census	Pop.	Note	%±
2020	1,233		—
U.S. Decennial Census

As of the census of 2000, there were 1,213 people, 508 households, and 376 families residing in the CDP. The population density was 876.0 inhabitants per square mile (338.2/km^{2}). There were 534 housing units at an average density of 385.7 per square mile (148.9/km^{2}). The racial makeup of the CDP was 99.01% White, 0.74% Asian, and 0.25% from two or more races. Hispanic or Latino of any race were 0.41% of the population.

There were 508 households, out of which 27.6% had children under the age of 18 living with them, 61.0% were married couples living together, 9.4% had a female householder with no husband present, and 25.8% were non-families. 23.2% of all households were made up of individuals, and 11.0% had someone living alone who was 65 years of age or older. The average household size was 2.39 and the average family size was 2.80.

In the CDP, the population was spread out, with 21.0% under the age of 18, 5.6% from 18 to 24, 27.9% from 25 to 44, 28.4% from 45 to 64, and 17.1% who were 65 years of age or older. The median age was 42 years. For every 100 females, there were 92.5 males. For every 100 females age 18 and over, there were 89.0 males.

The median income for a household in the CDP was $37,250, and the median income for a family was $43,317. Males had a median income of $30,938 versus $21,023 for females. The per capita income for the CDP was $19,091. About 5.2% of families and 4.8% of the population were below the poverty line, including 7.1% of those under age 18 and 7.2% of those age 65 or over.

== Education ==
Mifflinville is in the Central Columbia School District.

The Bloomsburg University of Pennsylvania is the nearest college to Mifflinville.

== Notable facts ==
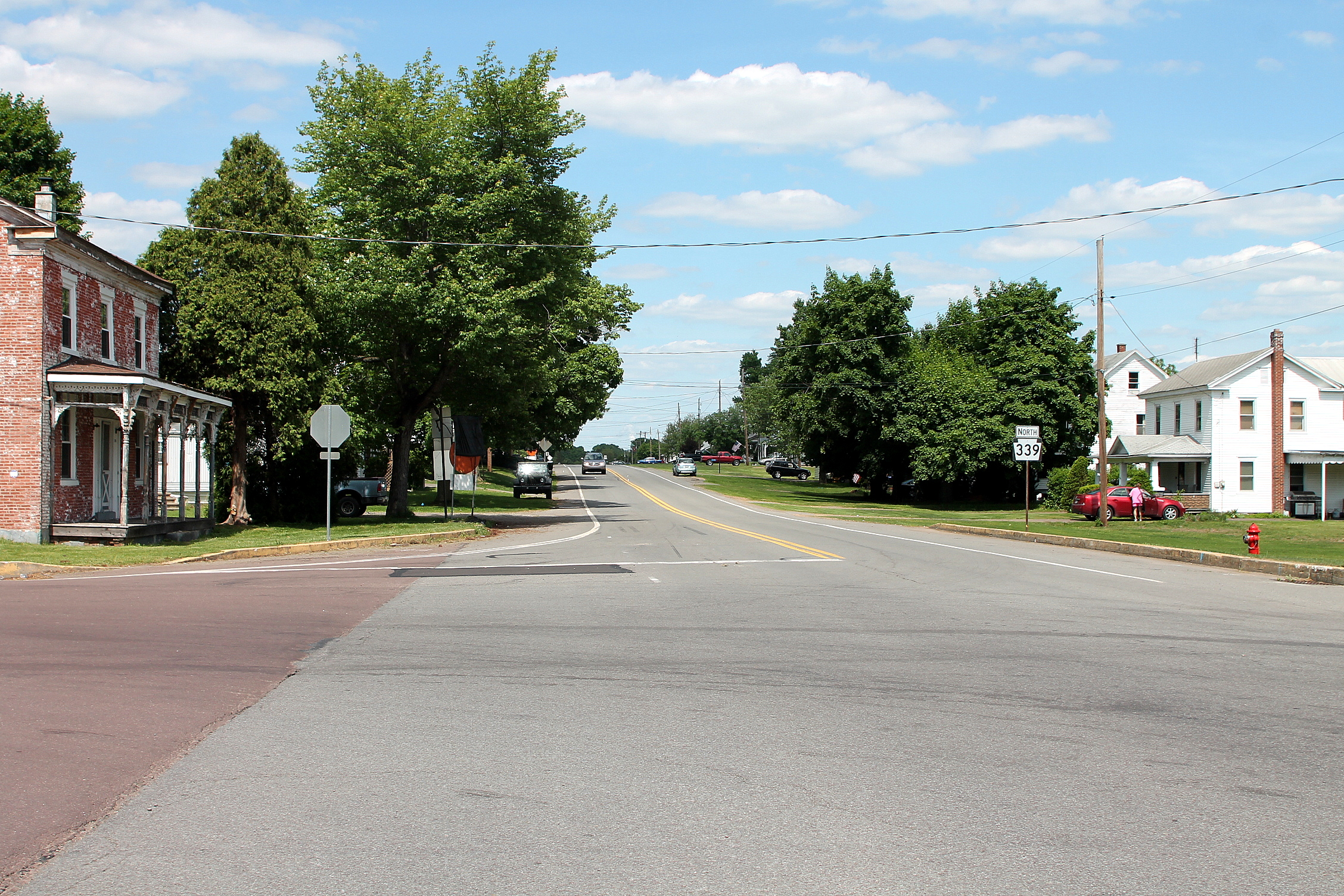
Pennsylvania Route 339 in Mifflinville

The 2011 Rockefeller Center Christmas Tree, a 74-foot-tall (23 m) Norway spruce, came from Mifflinville.
