= Espy, Pennsylvania =

Unincorporated community in Pennsylvania, US

- Census-designated place
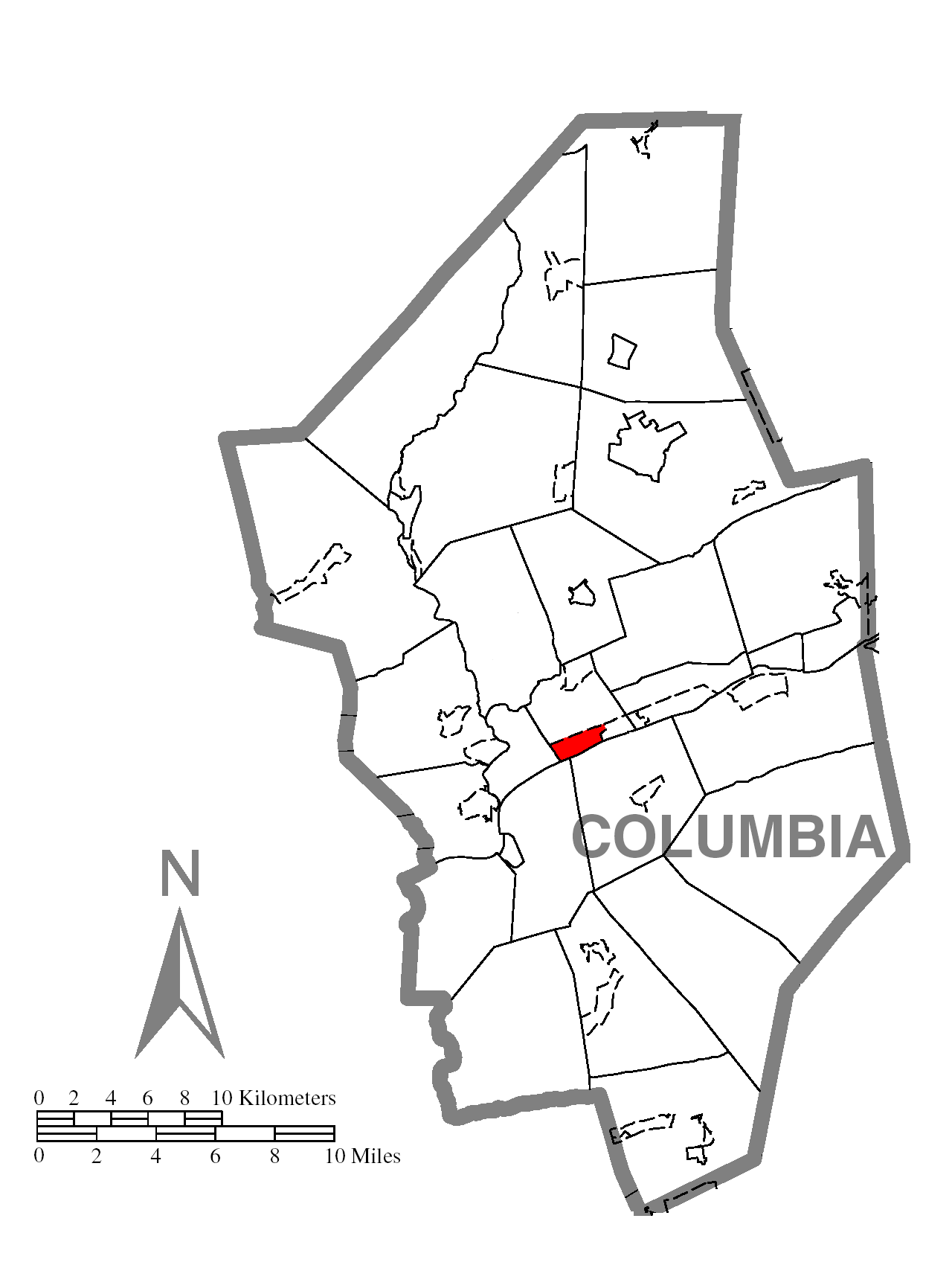
- Location within Columbia County

- Location within the U.S. state of Pennsylvania Espy (the United States)
- Coordinates: 41°0′21″N 76°24′54″W
- Country: United States
- State: Pennsylvania
- County: Columbia
- Township: Scott

Area
  - Total: 1.10 sq mi (2.86 km^{2})
  - Land: 0.90 sq mi (2.33 km^{2})
  - Water: 0.20 sq mi (0.53 km^{2})
- Elevation: 480 ft (150 m)

Population (2020)
  - Total: 1,620
  - Density: 1,801.6/sq mi (695.61/km^{2})
- Time zone: UTC-5 (Eastern (EST))
  - Summer (DST): UTC-4 (EDT)
- ZIP Code: 17815
- FIPS code: 42-24088
- GNIS feature ID: 1174322

Espy is a census-designated place (CDP) in Columbia County, Pennsylvania, United States. It is part of Northeastern Pennsylvania. The population was 1,620 at the 2020 census. It is part of the Bloomsburg-Berwick micropolitan area. Espy was first settled in the late 18th century. It was home to a boatyard in the 19th century.

== History ==
Espy was named after Josiah Espy, an early settler who moved to the area in 1775. Soon afterwards, in 1785, Josiah's son George moved into the area as well. In 1800, George Espy divided up the area that is now Espy into lots. The town was originally called Liberty but was officially renamed Espy in 1828 after George Espy. The first hotel in Espy was built in 1805. There used to a boatyard in Espy, but it was destroyed in 1900.

== Geography ==
Espy is located near the center of Columbia County at 41°0′21″N 76°24′54″W (41.005904, -76.414883). It is in the southwestern corner of Scott Township and is bordered by U.S. Route 11 to the north, the Susquehanna River to the south, Almedia to the east, and Bloomsburg, the county seat, to the west and northwest.

According to the U.S. Census Bureau, the Espy CDP has a total area of 1.1 square miles (2.9 km^{2}), of which 0.93 square miles (2.4 km^{2}) is land and 0.19 square miles (0.5 km^{2}), or 18.07%, is water. Espy is one of several small CDPs on the north side of the Susquehanna River between Bloomsburg and Berwick.

== Demographics ==
Historical population
Census	Pop.	Note	%±
2020	1,620		—
U.S. Decennial Census

As of the census of 2000, there were 1,428 people, 658 households, and 402 families residing in the CDP. The population density was 1,547.8 inhabitants per square mile (597.6/km^{2}). There were 690 housing units at an average density of 747.9 per square mile (288.8/km^{2}). The racial makeup of the CDP was 97.48% White, 0.63% African American, 0.14% Native American, 1.12% Asian, 0.21% from other races, and 0.42% from two or more races. Hispanic or Latino of any race were 1.12% of the population.

There were 658 households, out of which 23.4% had children under the age of 18 living with them, 49.4% were married couples living together, 9.1% had a female householder with no husband present, and 38.8% were non-families. 32.2% of all households were made up of individuals, and 14.1% had someone living alone who was 65 years of age or older. The average household size was 2.16 and the average family size was 2.73.

In the CDP, the population was spread out, with 19.0% under the age of 18, 7.4% from 18 to 24, 26.3% from 25 to 44, 28.9% from 45 to 64, and 18.5% who were 65 years of age or older. The median age was 43 years. For every 100 females, there were 88.1 males. For every 100 females age 18 and over, there were 88.0 males.

The median income for a household in the CDP was $33,250, and the median income for a family was $36,908. Males had a median income of $32,112 versus $29,943 for females. The per capita income for the CDP was $19,108. About 11.2% of families and 17.3% of the population were below the poverty line, including 20.6% of those under age 18 and 13.1% of those age 65 or over.

In 2000, 2.0% of Espy residents identified as being of Egyptian heritage. This was the highest percentage of Egyptian Americans of any place in the country, although in raw numbers this is dwarfed by neighborhoods in Jersey City, New Jersey, and Queens, New York.

The most common ancestries in Espy are German (32%), Irish (13.9%), Dutch (11.2%), American (8.8%), British (7.6%), and Italian (6.8%).

== Major roads ==
U.S. Route 11 forms the northern edge of the Espy CDP. It leads west 2.5 miles (4.0 km) to the center of Bloomsburg and 11 miles (18 km) to Danville, and east 10 miles (16 km) to Berwick.

== Education ==
Espy is in the Central Columbia School District.

Bloomsburg University of Pennsylvania is the nearest university with over 2,000 students to Espy.
