= Almedia, Pennsylvania =

Unincorporated community in Pennsylvania, US

- Census-designated place
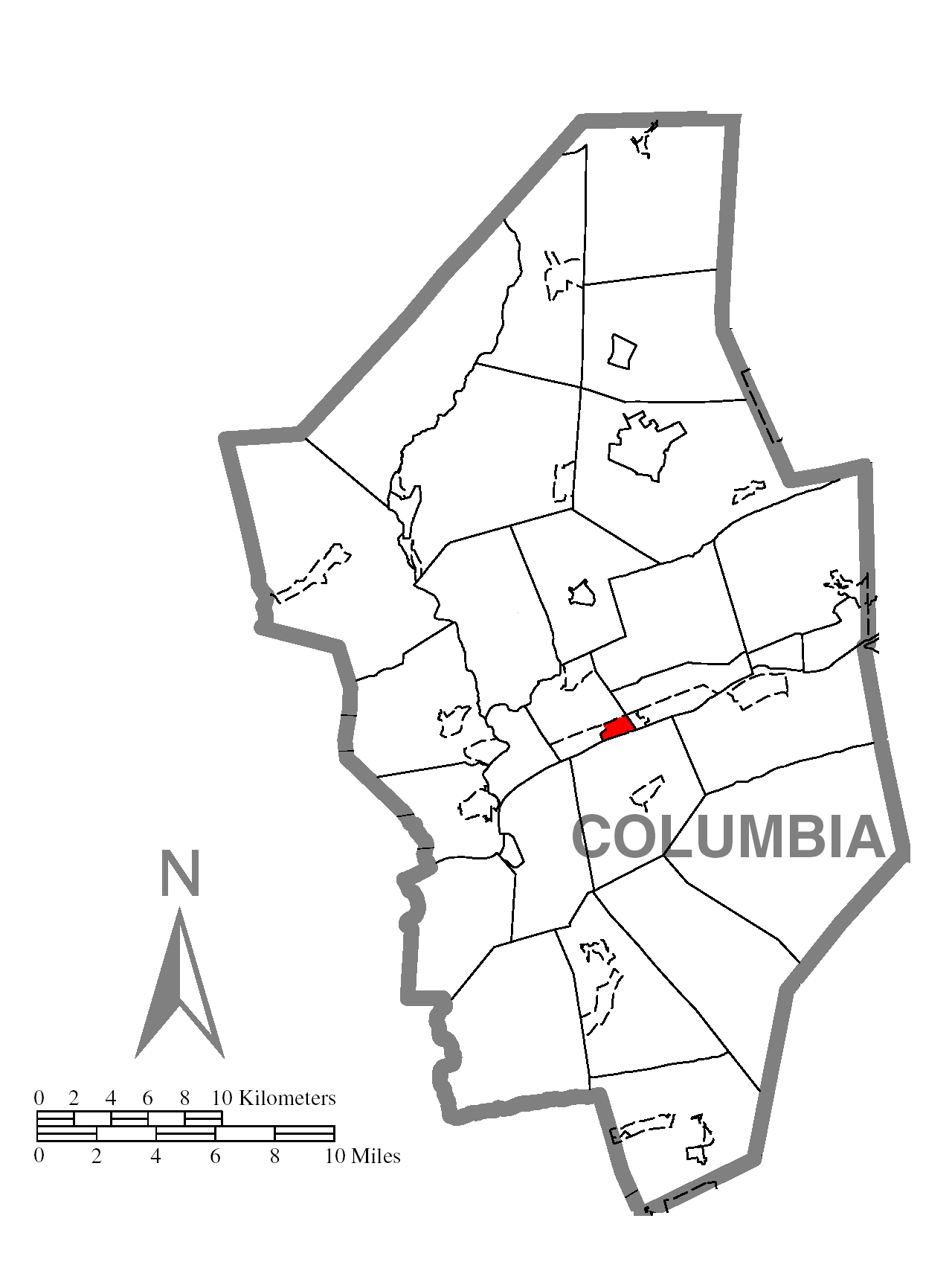
- Location within Columbia County

- Location within the U.S. state of Pennsylvania Almedia (the United States)
- Coordinates: 41°0′56″N 76°23′5″W
- Country: United States
- State: Pennsylvania
- County: Columbia
- Townships: Scott, South Centre

Area
  - Total: 0.93 sq mi (2.42 km^{2})
  - Land: 0.70 sq mi (1.82 km^{2})
  - Water: 0.23 sq mi (0.60 km^{2})
- Elevation: 505 ft (154 m)

Population (2020)
  - Total: 1,040
  - Density: 1,483.5/sq mi (572.79/km^{2})
- Time zone: UTC-5 (Eastern (EST))
  - Summer (DST): UTC-4 (EDT)
- ZIP code: 17815
- FIPS code: 42-02088
- GNIS feature ID: 1168216

Almedia is a census-designated place (CDP) in Columbia County, Pennsylvania, United States. It is part of Northeastern Pennsylvania. The population was 1,040 at the 2020 census. It is part of the Bloomsburg-Berwick micropolitan area.

== History ==
Almedia was once called Afton. There used to be lime quarries and coal-dredging industries near Almedia.

== Geography ==
Almedia is located near the center of Columbia County at 41°0′56″N 76°23′5″W (41.015556, -76.384814). It is in southeastern Scott Township and southwestern South Centre Township and is bordered by the Susquehanna River to the south, U.S. Route 11 to the north, Espy to the west, and Lime Ridge to the east.

According to the United States Census Bureau, the CDP has a total area of 0.77 square miles (2.0 km^{2}), of which 0.58 square miles (1.5 km^{2}) is land and 0.19 square miles (0.5 km^{2}), or 26.61%, is water.

== Demographics ==
Historical population
Census	Pop.	Note	%±
2020	1,040		—
U.S. Decennial Census

As of the census of 2010, there were 1,078 people, 491 households, and 326 families residing in the CDP. The population density was 1,714 inhabitants per square mile (662/km^{2}). The racial makeup of the CDP was 100.00% White.

The average household size was 2.19 and the average family size was 3.3.

In the CDP, the population was spread out, with 20.4% age 19 and under, 2.4% from 20 to 24, 24.1% from 25 to 44, 31% from 45 to 64, and 20.1% who were 65 years of age or older. The median age was 48.4 years. For every 100 females, there were 96.1 males.

The median income for a household in the CDP was $47,813, and the median income for a family was $56,932. Males had a median income of $43,333 versus $29,828 for females. The per capita income for the CDP was $27,637. About 2.8% of families and 7.1% of the population were below the poverty line, including 0.0% of those under age 18 and 4.9% of those age 65 or over.

== Education ==
The school district is the Central Columbia School District.
