= Light Street (disambiguation) =

Light Street is a portion of Maryland Route 2 in Baltimore, Maryland.

Light Street may also refer to:

- Light Street, George Town, Penang, Malaysia
- Lightstreet, Pennsylvania, an unincorporated community
