= Columbia County, Pennsylvania =

County in Pennsylvania, United States

- County
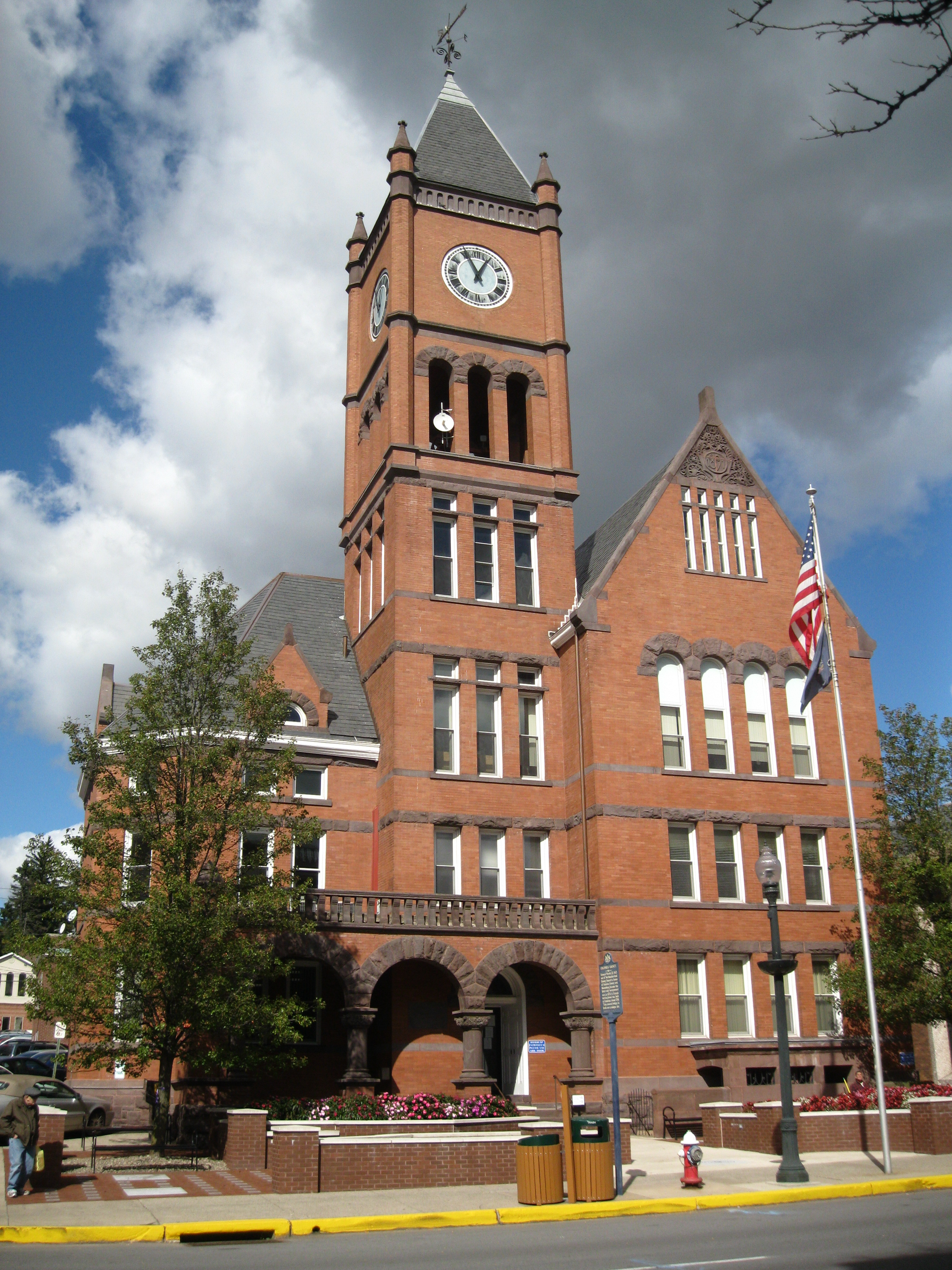
- The Columbia County courthouse in Bloomsburg

- Location within the U.S. state of Pennsylvania
- Coordinates: 41°03′N 76°24′W
- Country: United States
- State: Pennsylvania
- Founded: March 22, 1813
- Named for: Columbia
- Seat: Bloomsburg
- Largest town: Bloomsburg

Area
  - Total: 490 sq mi (1,300 km^{2})
  - Land: 483 sq mi (1,250 km^{2})
  - Water: 7.1 sq mi (18 km^{2}) 1.4%

Population (2020)
  - Total: 64,727
  - Estimate (2025): 66,193 ▲
  - Density: 134/sq mi (51.7/km^{2})
- Time zone: UTC−5 (Eastern)
  - Summer (DST): UTC−4 (EDT)
- Congressional district: 9th
- Website: www.columbiapa.org

Pennsylvania Historical Marker
- Designated: July 11, 1983

Columbia County is a county in the Commonwealth of Pennsylvania, United States. As of the 2020 census, the population was 64,727. Its county seat is Bloomsburg. The county was created on March 22, 1813, from part of Northumberland County. It was named Columbia, alluding to the United States and Christopher Columbus. The county is part of the Central region of the commonwealth. (Note: Includes Centre, Lycoming, Northumberland, Columbia, Mifflin, Union, Snyder, Clinton, Juniata and Montour Counties)

Columbia County is part of the Bloomsburg–Berwick metropolitan area.

== Geography ==
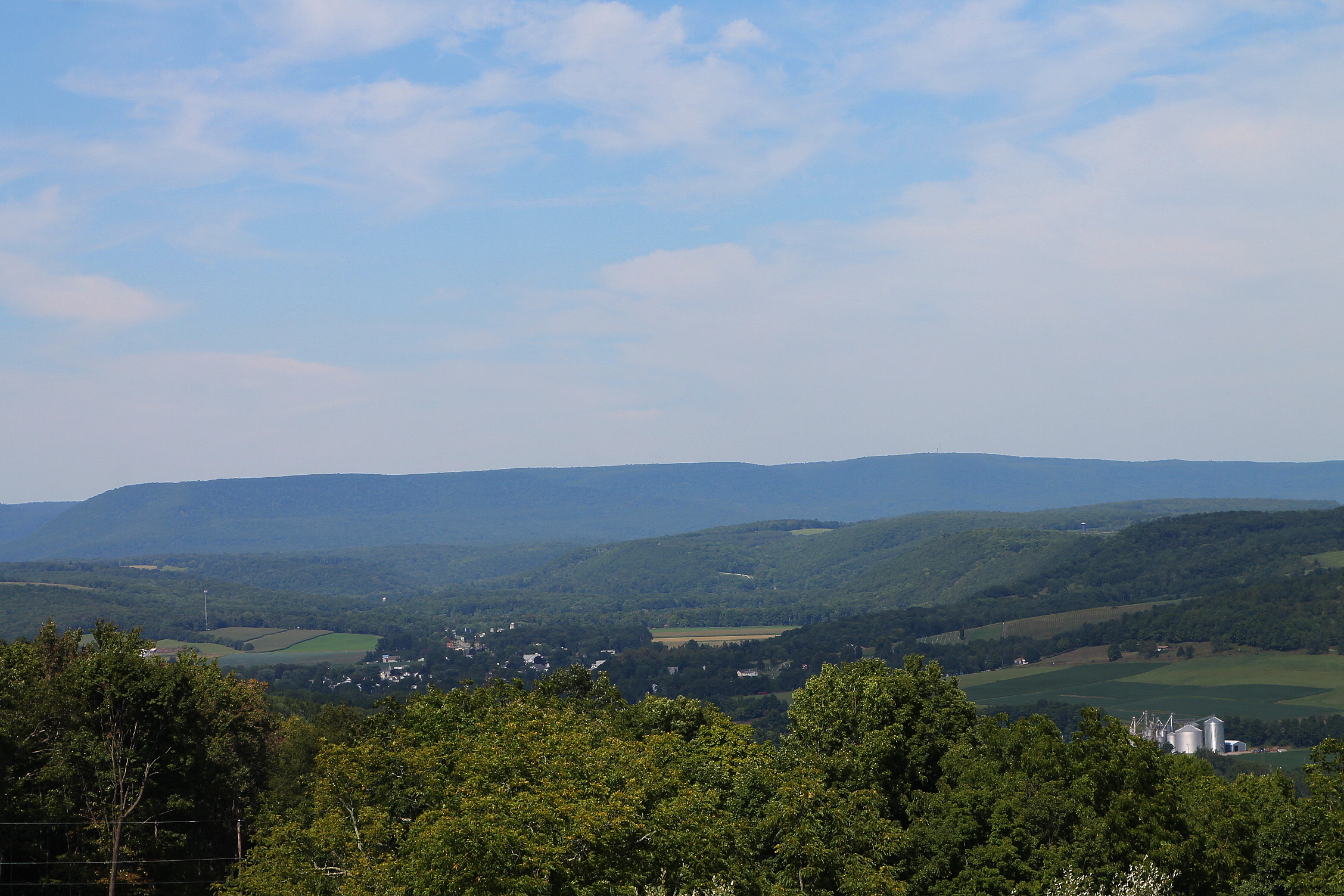
View of northern Columbia County, Pennsylvania from Kramer Hill Road in Fishing Creek Township. On the horizon (about 8-10 miles away) is North Mountain. The borough of Benton is in the center of the picture.

According to the U.S. Census Bureau, the county has a total area of 490 square miles (1,300 km^{2}), of which 483 square miles (1,250 km^{2}) is land and 7.1 square miles (18 km^{2}) (1.4%) is water. The southern tip of Columbia County is part of the Coal Region. The area of the county from the Susquehanna River south to several miles south of Numidia consists mostly of farmland and state game lands. Several communities developed along the Susquehanna River, such as Bloomsburg and Catawissa. From the Susquehanna River north as far as Waller, the county is mostly farmland with several patches of forest. North of Waller, the county is mostly state game lands and mountains.

The major streams in Columbia County are the Susquehanna River, Fishing Creek, Briar Creek, Catawissa Creek, and Roaring Creek.

The county has a humid continental climate (Dfa/Dfb) and average monthly temperatures in Bloomsburg average from 26.9 °F or −2.8 °C in January to 72.4 °F or 22.4 °C in July.

=== Mountains ===
Note: Only mountains higher than 1,500 feet (460 m) are listed

Name	Height	Image
Red Rock Mountain	2,365 feet (721 m)	
Central Mountain	2,247 feet (685 m)	
Chimneystack Rock	2,244 feet (684 m)	
Buck Mountain	1,942 feet (592 m)	
Catawissa Mountain	1,873 feet (571 m)	
Big Mountain	1,811 feet (552 m)	
Knob Mountain	1,752 feet (534 m)	
Nescopeck Mountain	1,604 feet (489 m)	
Lee Mountain	1,594 feet (486 m)	
McCauley Mountain	1,571 feet (479 m)	

=== Major highways ===
- I-80
- US 11
- PA 42
- PA 44
- PA 54
- PA 61
- PA 93
- PA 118
- PA 239
- PA 254
- PA 339
- PA 442
- PA 487
- PA 642

=== Adjacent counties ===
- Sullivan County (north)
- Luzerne County (east)
- Schuylkill County (southeast)
- Northumberland County (southwest)
- Montour County (west)
- Lycoming County (northwest)

=== State park ===
Part of Ricketts Glen State Park is in the northern portion of Columbia County.

== Demographics ==
Historical population
Census	Pop.	Note	%±
1820	17,621		—
1830	20,059		13.8%
1840	24,267		21.0%
1850	17,710		−27.0%
1860	25,065		41.5%
1870	28,766		14.8%
1880	32,409		12.7%
1890	36,832		13.6%
1900	39,896		8.3%
1910	48,467		21.5%
1920	48,349		−0.2%
1930	48,803		0.9%
1940	51,413		5.3%
1950	53,460		4.0%
1960	53,489		0.1%
1970	55,114		3.0%
1980	61,967		12.4%
1990	63,202		2.0%
2000	64,151		1.5%
2010	67,295		4.9%
2020	64,727		−3.8%
2025 (est.)	66,193	▲	2.3%

=== Racial and ethnic composition ===
Columbia County, Pennsylvania – Racial and ethnic composition Note: the US Census treats Hispanic/Latino as an ethnic category. This table excludes Latinos from the racial categories and assigns them to a separate category. Hispanics/Latinos may be of any race.
Race / Ethnicity (NH = Non-Hispanic)	Pop 1980	Pop 1990	Pop 2000	Pop 2010	Pop 2020	% 1980	% 1990	% 2000	% 2010	% 2020
White alone (NH)	61,325	62,317	62,269	63,500	58,831	98.96%	98.60%	97.07%	94.36%	90.89%
Black or African American alone (NH)	197	265	481	1,190	867	0.32%	0.42%	0.75%	1.77%	1.34%
Native American or Alaska Native alone (NH)	21	37	85	57	71	0.03%	0.06%	0.13%	0.08%	0.11%
Asian alone (NH)	185	223	332	547	748	0.30%	0.35%	0.52%	0.81%	1.16%
Native Hawaiian or Pacific Islander alone (NH)	x	x	13	14	17	x	x	0.02%	0.02%	0.03%
Other race alone (NH)	41	19	32	38	159	0.07%	0.03%	0.05%	0.06%	0.25%
Mixed race or Multiracial (NH)	x	x	330	600	1,894	x	x	0.51%	0.89%	2.93%
Hispanic or Latino (any race)	198	341	609	1,349	2,140	0.32%	0.54%	0.95%	2.00%	3.31%
Total	61,967	63,202	64,151	67,295	64,727	100.00%	100.00%	100.00%	100.00%	100.00%

=== 2020 census ===
As of the 2020 census, the county had a population of 64,727. The median age was 41.6 years. 18.0% of residents were under the age of 18 and 20.4% of residents were 65 years of age or older. For every 100 females there were 94.1 males, and for every 100 females age 18 and over there were 92.1 males age 18 and over.

The racial makeup of the county was 92.0% White, 1.4% Black or African American, 0.2% American Indian and Alaska Native, 1.2% Asian, <0.1% Native Hawaiian and Pacific Islander, 1.3% from some other race, and 3.9% from two or more races. Hispanic or Latino residents of any race comprised 3.3% of the population.

55.3% of residents lived in urban areas, while 44.7% lived in rural areas.

There were 26,386 households in the county, of which 24.3% had children under the age of 18 living in them. Of all households, 45.7% were married-couple households, 19.5% were households with a male householder and no spouse or partner present, and 26.4% were households with a female householder and no spouse or partner present. About 30.2% of all households were made up of individuals and 13.7% had someone living alone who was 65 years of age or older.

There were 29,654 housing units, of which 11.0% were vacant. Among occupied housing units, 68.9% were owner-occupied and 31.1% were renter-occupied. The homeowner vacancy rate was 1.6% and the rental vacancy rate was 7.8%.

=== 2000 census ===
As of the 2000 census, there were 64,151 people, 24,915 households, and 16,568 families residing in the county. The population density was 132 inhabitants per square mile (51/km^{2}). There were 27,733 housing units at an average density of 57 units per square mile (22/km^{2}). The racial makeup of the county was 97.59% White, 0.80% Black or African-American, 0.15% Native American, 0.52% Asian, 0.03% Pacific Islander, 0.33% from other races, and 0.58% from two or more races. 0.95% of the population were Hispanic or Latino of any race. 33.2% were of German, 10.0% American, 9.4% Irish, 8.1% Italian, 6.7% Polish and 6.2% English ancestry.

There were 24,915 households, out of which 27.70% had children under the age of 18 living with them, 53.80% were married couples living together, 8.70% had a female householder with no husband present, and 33.50% were non-families. 26.60% of all households were made up of individuals, and 11.80% had someone living alone who was 65 years of age or older. The average household size was 2.42 and the average family size was 2.90.

In the county, the population was spread out, with 20.80% under the age of 18, 14.30% from 18 to 24, 25.90% from 25 to 44, 23.10% from 45 to 64, and 15.90% who were 65 years of age or older. The median age was 38 years. For every 100 females, there were 90.80 males. For every 100 females age 18 and over, there were 87.80 males.

== Metropolitan Statistical Area ==
The United States Office of Management and Budget has designated Columbia County as the Bloomsburg-Berwick, PA Metropolitan Statistical Area (MSA). As of the 2010 census the metropolitan area ranked 20th most populous in the State of Pennsylvania and the 368th most populous in the United States with a population of 82,562. Columbia County is also a part of the larger Bloomsburg-Berwick-Sunbury, PA Combined Statistical Area (CSA), which combines the populations of Columbia County as well as Montour, Northumberland, Snyder and Union Counties in Pennsylvania. The Combined Statistical Area ranked 8th in the State of Pennsylvania and 115th most populous in the United States with a population of 264,739.

== Politics and government ==
United States presidential election results for Columbia County, Pennsylvania
Year	Republican		Democratic		Third party(ies)	
Year	No.	%	No.	%	No.	%
1888	2,484	33.38%	4,676	62.84%	281	3.78%
1892	2,336	30.56%	4,929	64.47%	380	4.97%
1896	3,280	37.77%	4,904	56.47%	500	5.76%
1900	2,954	35.21%	4,982	59.38%	454	5.41%
1904	3,635	44.08%	4,196	50.89%	415	5.03%
1908	3,718	39.17%	5,373	56.60%	402	4.23%
1912	889	9.98%	4,905	55.05%	3,116	34.97%
1916	3,013	32.80%	5,785	62.97%	389	4.23%
1920	6,238	45.65%	6,965	50.97%	462	3.38%
1924	7,336	47.42%	7,390	47.77%	743	4.80%
1928	14,362	72.61%	5,304	26.81%	115	0.58%
1932	8,791	44.43%	10,640	53.77%	356	1.80%
1936	9,674	40.13%	14,141	58.66%	293	1.22%
1940	9,518	43.05%	12,523	56.65%	66	0.30%
1944	9,336	49.00%	9,647	50.63%	70	0.37%
1948	9,417	50.13%	9,367	49.87%	0	0.00%
1952	13,008	57.67%	9,467	41.97%	79	0.35%
1956	13,382	59.69%	9,024	40.25%	15	0.07%
1960	15,310	62.11%	9,322	37.82%	19	0.08%
1964	8,982	39.22%	13,885	60.63%	36	0.16%
1968	12,202	54.89%	8,187	36.83%	1,840	8.28%
1972	14,187	63.59%	7,222	32.37%	900	4.03%
1976	11,508	48.10%	12,051	50.37%	366	1.53%
1980	12,426	53.30%	9,449	40.53%	1,438	6.17%
1984	14,402	63.39%	8,254	36.33%	62	0.27%
1988	12,114	60.51%	7,767	38.79%	140	0.70%
1992	9,742	41.04%	8,261	34.80%	5,736	24.16%
1996	8,234	40.42%	8,379	41.13%	3,759	18.45%
2000	12,095	55.20%	8,975	40.96%	841	3.84%
2004	16,052	59.74%	10,679	39.74%	138	0.51%
2008	14,477	51.20%	13,230	46.79%	571	2.02%
2012	14,236	55.30%	10,937	42.48%	571	2.22%
2016	18,004	63.16%	8,934	31.34%	1,568	5.50%
2020	20,098	64.25%	10,532	33.67%	650	2.08%
2024	21,190	64.78%	11,083	33.88%	436	1.33%

United States Senate election results for Columbia County, Pennsylvania1
Year	Republican		Democratic		Third party(ies)	
Year	No.	%	No.	%	No.	%
1994	8,419	51.12%	7,177	43.58%	873	5.30%
2000	13,405	62.61%	7,337	34.27%	668	3.12%
2006	8,970	49.02%	9,327	50.98%	0	0.00%
2012	13,509	53.11%	11,336	44.57%	592	2.33%
2018	13,437	59.36%	8,837	39.04%	364	1.61%
2024	14,830	55.72%	10,969	41.22%	814	3.06%

United States Senate election results for Columbia County, Pennsylvania3
Year	Republican		Democratic		Third party(ies)	
Year	No.	%	No.	%	No.	%
1992	11,512	48.87%	10,814	45.90%	1,232	5.23%
1998	9,003	63.34%	4,662	32.80%	548	3.86%
2004	16,522	63.14%	8,214	31.39%	1,430	5.47%
2010	11,287	62.17%	6,868	37.83%	0	0.00%
2016	16,292	57.97%	9,819	34.94%	1,991	7.08%
2022	14,830	59.93%	9,023	36.46%	892	3.60%

Pennsylvania Gubernatorial election results for Columbia County
Year	Republican		Democratic		Third party(ies)	
Year	No.	%	No.	%	No.	%
1970	8,976	48.63%	7,983	43.25%	1,498	8.12%
1974	8,615	48.36%	8,846	49.65%	355	1.99%
1978	10,907	56.99%	8,122	42.43%	111	0.58%
1982	9,108	47.17%	10,164	52.64%	38	0.20%
1986	7,709	45.69%	9,069	53.75%	95	0.56%
1990	4,436	31.91%	9,449	67.98%	15	0.11%
1994	8,274	50.17%	5,980	36.26%	2,239	13.58%
1998	8,720	60.58%	4,175	29.00%	1,500	10.42%
2002	9,304	55.65%	7,004	41.89%	410	2.45%
2006	9,078	49.45%	9,281	50.55%	0	0.00%
2010	12,151	66.45%	6,136	33.55%	0	0.00%
2014	8,585	56.64%	6,572	43.36%	0	0.00%
2018	12,424	54.88%	9,822	43.39%	392	1.73%
2022	13,959	56.51%	10,148	41.08%	596	2.41%

=== Voter registration ===
As of February 6, 2024, there were 39,054 registered voters in Columbia County.

- Republican: 20,820 (53.31%)
- Democratic: 12,268 (31.41%)
- Independent: 4,360 (11.16%)
- Third Party: 1,606 (4.11%)
Chart of Voter Registration
1. Republican (53.3%)
2. Democratic (31.4%)
3. Independent (11.2%)
4. Other Parties (4.11%)

While the county registration tends to be evenly matched between Democrats and Republicans, the county trends Republican in statewide elections. Donald Trump carried the county by more than 30 points in both 2016 and 2020. While John McCain received 51.6% of its vote to 47.1% for Barack Obama, this was a far-closer margin than the 20 points that George W. Bush carried it by in 2004. Each of the three row-office statewide winners carried Columbia in 2008. In 2006, Democrat Bob Casey Jr. received 51% of its vote when he unseated incumbent Republican US Senator Rick Santorum and Ed Rendell received 50.6% of the vote against Lynn Swann.

For many years Columbia County was represented in the State House by a conservative Democrat in the 109th district until John Gordner changed parties to Republican in 2001. He was elected to the State Senate in 2003 and succeeded by Republican David R. Millard. Columbia is in the 27th Senate district and 11th Congressional district.

=== County commissioners ===
Commissioner	Party
David Kovach	Democratic
Dean Brewer	Republican
Randy Karschner	Republican

=== Other county officials ===
Office	Official	Party
Chief Judge	Thomas A. James	Democratic
Judge	Gary Norton	Republican
Chief Clerk	Gail Kipp	Democratic
Coroner	Jeremy Reese	Republican
Recorder of Deeds and Register of Wills	Beverly Michael	Democratic
Sheriff	Tim Chamberlain	Democratic
Treasurer	Shirley Turner	Republican
Clerk of Courts and Prothonotary	Tami B. Kline	Republican

=== State senate ===
District	Senator	Party
27	Lynda Schlegel Culver	Republican

=== State House of Representatives ===
District	Representative	Party
109	Robert Leadbeter	Republican

=== United States House of Representatives ===
District	Representative	Party
9	Dan Meuser	Republican

=== United States Senate ===
Senator	Party
Dave McCormick	Republican
John Fetterman	Democratic

== Education ==
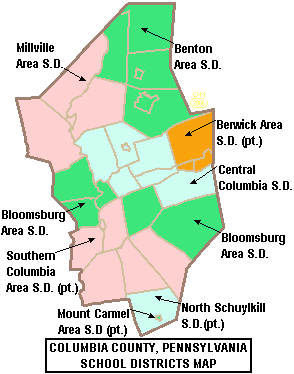
Map of Columbia County, Pennsylvania School Districts

=== Colleges and universities ===
- Bloomsburg University of Pennsylvania

=== Public school districts ===
School districts include:

- Benton Area School District
- Berwick Area School District (also in Luzerne County)
- Bloomsburg Area School District
- Central Columbia School District
- Millville Area School District
- Mount Carmel Area School District (also in Northumberland County)
- North Schuylkill School District (also in Schuylkill County)
- Southern Columbia Area School District (also in Northumberland County)

==== Technical school ====
- Columbia-Montour Area Vocational-Technical School

==== Charter school ====
- SusQ Cyber Charter School - Bloomsburg

=== Private schools ===
- Bald Hill School - Millville
- Bloomsburg Christian School - Bloomsburg
- Bloomsburg University Special Education Institute
- Columbia Co Christian School - Bloomsburg
- Greenwood Friends School - Millville
- Heritage Christian Academy - Berwick
- Holy Family Consolidate - Berwick
- Keystone National High School - Bloomsburg
- New Story - Berwick
- Pennsylvania Institute For Conservation Education - Bloomsburg
- Rainbow Hill School - Benton
- St Columba School - Bloomsburg
- Saint Matthews - Bloomsburg
- Turkey Ridge School - Bloomsburg

=== Libraries ===
- Bloomsburg Public Library
- Columbia County Traveling Library
- McBride Memorial Library
- Orangeville Public Library

== Communities ==
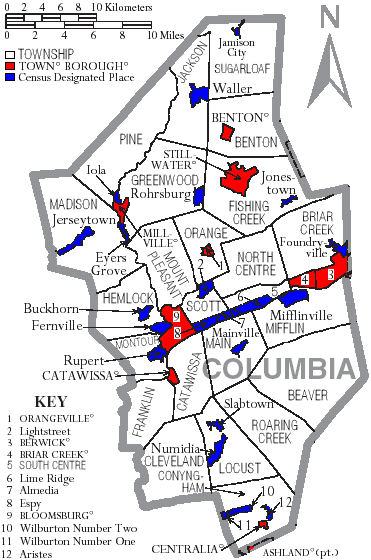
Map of Columbia County, Pennsylvania with Municipal Labels showing Towns and Boroughs (red), Townships (white), and Census-designated places (blue).

Under Pennsylvania law, there are four types of incorporated municipalities: cities, boroughs, townships, and, in at most two cases, towns. The following town, boroughs and townships are located in Columbia County:

=== Town ===
- Bloomsburg (county seat)

=== Boroughs ===
- Ashland (mostly in Schuylkill County)
- Benton
- Berwick
- Briar Creek
- Catawissa
- Centralia
- Millville
- Orangeville
- Stillwater

=== Townships ===
- Beaver
- Benton
- Briar Creek
- Catawissa
- Cleveland
- Conyngham
- Fishing Creek
- Franklin
- Greenwood
- Hemlock
- Jackson
- Locust
- Madison
- Main
- Mifflin
- Montour
- Mount Pleasant
- North Centre
- Orange
- Pine
- Roaring Creek
- Scott
- South Centre
- Sugarloaf

=== Census-designated places ===
Census-designated places are geographical areas designated by the U.S. Census Bureau for the purposes of compiling demographic data. They are not actual jurisdictions under Pennsylvania law. Other unincorporated communities, such as villages, may be listed here as well.

- Almedia
- Aristes
- Buckhorn
- Espy
- Eyers Grove
- Fernville
- Foundryville
- Iola
- Jamison City
- Jerseytown
- Jonestown
- Lightstreet
- Lime Ridge
- Locustdale (partially in Schuylkill County)
- Mainville
- Mifflinville
- Numidia
- Rohrsburg
- Rupert
- Slabtown
- Waller
- Wilburton Number One
- Wilburton Number Two

=== Unincorporated communities ===
- Central
- Elk Grove
- Mifflin Cross Roads

=== Population ranking ===
The population ranking of the following table is based on the 2010 census of Columbia County.

† county seat

Rank	City/Town/etc.	Municipal type	Population (2010 Census)
1	† Bloomsburg	Town	14,855
2	Berwick	Borough	10,477
3	Ashland (mostly in Schuylkill County)	Borough	2,817
4	Espy	CDP	1,642
5	Catawissa	Borough	1,552
6	Mifflinville	CDP	1,253
7	Lightstreet	CDP	1,093
8	Almedia	CDP	1,078
9	Millville	Borough	948
10	Lime Ridge	CDP	890
11	Benton	Borough	824
12	Briar Creek	Borough	660
13	Fernville	CDP	556
14	Orangeville	Borough	508
15	Buckhorn	CDP	318
16	Aristes	CDP	311
17	Foundryville	CDP	256
18	Numidia	CDP	244
19	Stillwater	Borough	209
20	Wilburton Number One	CDP	196
21	Jerseytown	CDP	184
22	Rupert	CDP	183
23	Locustdale (partially in Schuylkill County)	CDP	177
24	Slabtown	CDP	156
25	Rohrsburg	CDP	145
26	Iola	CDP	144
27	Jamison City	CDP	134
28	Mainville	CDP	132
29	Eyers Grove	CDP	105
30	Wilburton Number Two	CDP	96
31	Jonestown	CDP	64
32	Waller	CDP	48
33	Centralia	Borough	10

== See also ==
- National Register of Historic Places listings in Columbia County, Pennsylvania
