= Waller, Pennsylvania =

Unincorporated community in Pennsylvania, US

- Census-designated place
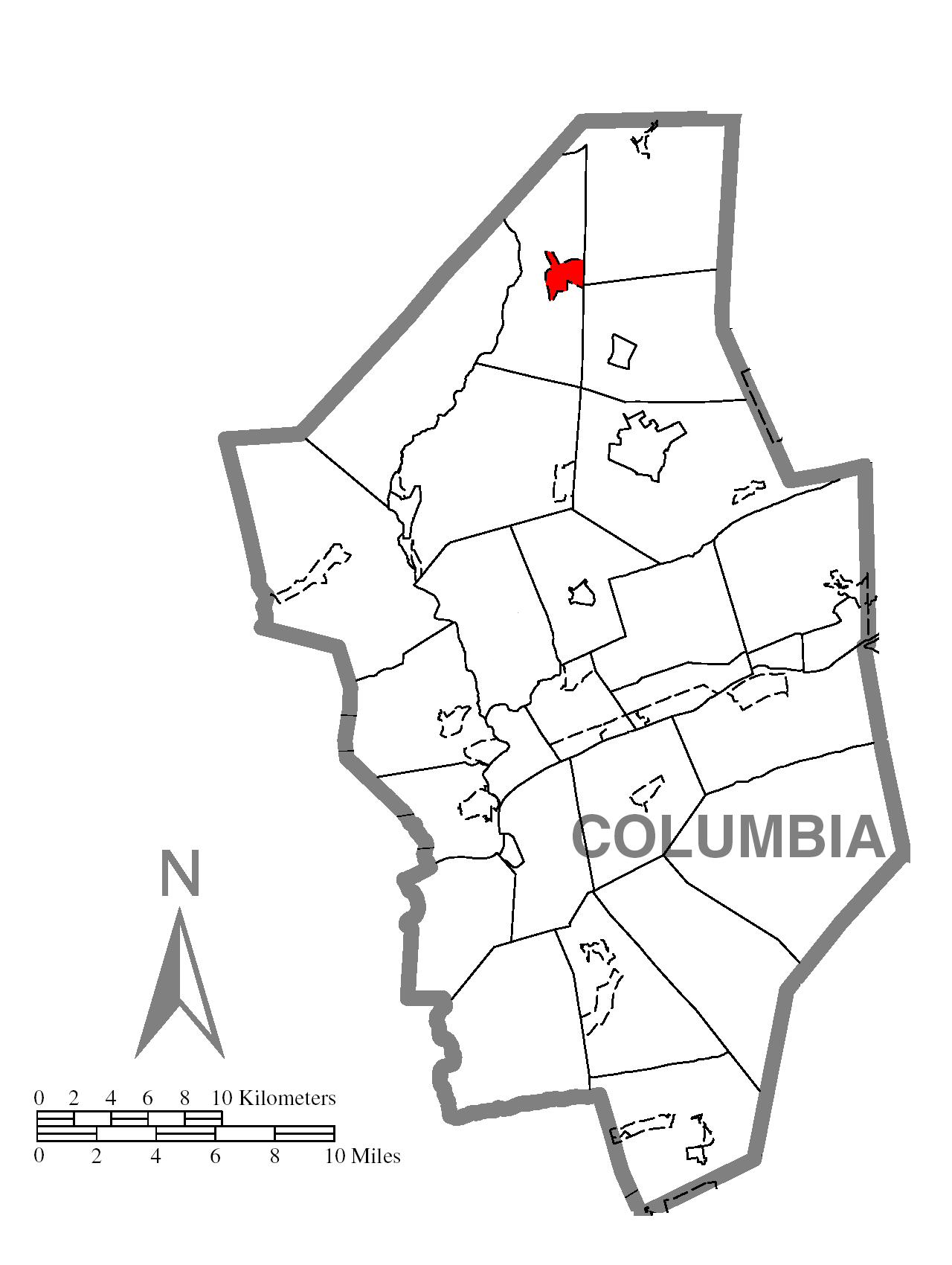
- Location within Columbia County

- Location within the U.S. state of Pennsylvania
- Coordinates: 41°13′57″N 76°25′23″W
- Country: United States
- State: Pennsylvania
- County: Columbia
- Township: Jackson

Area
  - Total: 1.3 sq mi (3.3 km^{2})
  - Land: 1.3 sq mi (3.3 km^{2})
- Elevation: 1,259 ft (384 m)

Population (2020)
  - Total: 45
  - Density: 38/sq mi (14.5/km^{2})
- Time zone: UTC-5 (Eastern (EST))
  - Summer (DST): UTC-4 (EDT)
- ZIP Code: 17814
- FIPS code: 42-80656
- GNIS feature ID: 1190527

Waller is a census-designated place (CDP) in Columbia County, Pennsylvania, United States. It is part of the Bloomsburg–Berwick micropolitan area in Northeastern Pennsylvania. The population was 45 at the 2020 census.

== History ==
Waller was called "Polksville" until the late 19th century. Historically, there was a church and a post office in Waller.

== Geography ==
Waller is located in northern Columbia County at 41°13′45″N 76°25′19″W (41.229077, -76.422059), in the east center of Jackson Township. According to the United States Census Bureau, the CDP has a total area of 1.3 square miles (3.3 km^{2}), all land.

Waller's terrain consists mostly of hills. The land is roughly split between forest and farmland. Green Creek, a tributary of Fishing Creek, rises in Waller. The CDP is not served directly by any major roads.

== Demographics ==
As of the census of 2000, there were 55 people, 26 households, and 17 families residing in the CDP. The population density was 43.7 inhabitants per square mile (16.9/km^{2}). There were 33 housing units at an average density of 26.2 per square mile (10.1/km^{2}). The racial makeup of the CDP was 100.00% White.

There were 26 households, out of which 15.4% had children under the age of 18 living with them, 57.7% were married couples living together, and 30.8% were non-families. 23.1% of all households were made up of individuals, and 15.4% had someone living alone who was 65 years of age or older. The average household size was 2.12 and the average family size was 2.44.

In the CDP, the population was spread out, with 14.5% under the age of 18, 5.5% from 18 to 24, 23.6% from 25 to 44, 30.9% from 45 to 64, and 25.5% who were 65 years of age or older. The median age was 48 years. For every 100 females, there were 83.3 males. For every 100 females age 18 and over, there were 80.8 males.

The median income for a household in the CDP was $36,875, and the median income for a family was $40,000. Males had a median income of $32,500 versus $12,083 for females. The per capita income for the CDP was $18,827. None of the population and none of the families were below the poverty line.

== Education ==
The school district is Benton Area School District. The district's schools are L.R. Appleman Elementary School and Benton Middle-Senior High School.
