= Orangeville, Pennsylvania =

Borough in Pennsylvania, US

- Borough
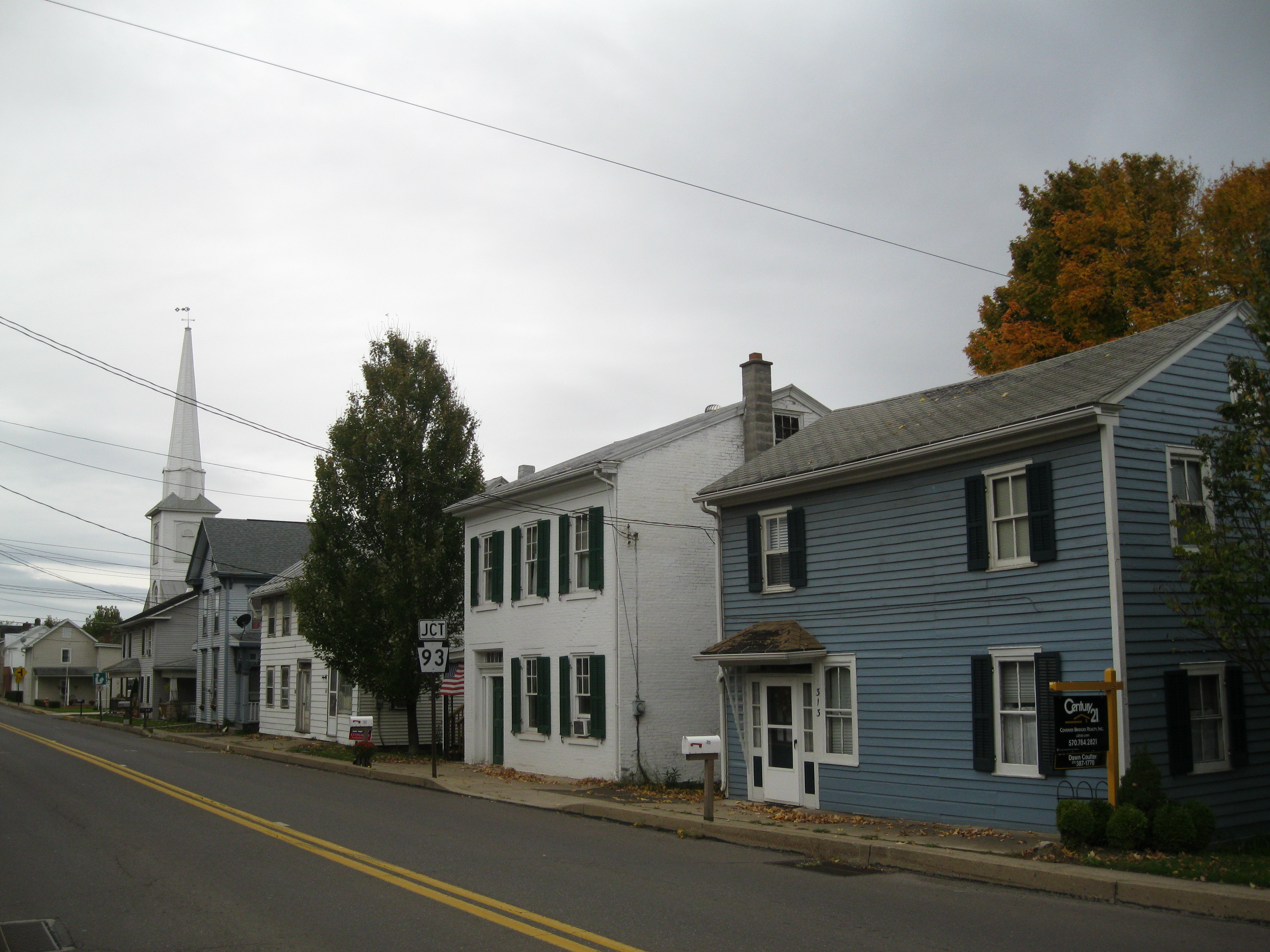
- Looking south on PA 487 in Orangeville in October 2012

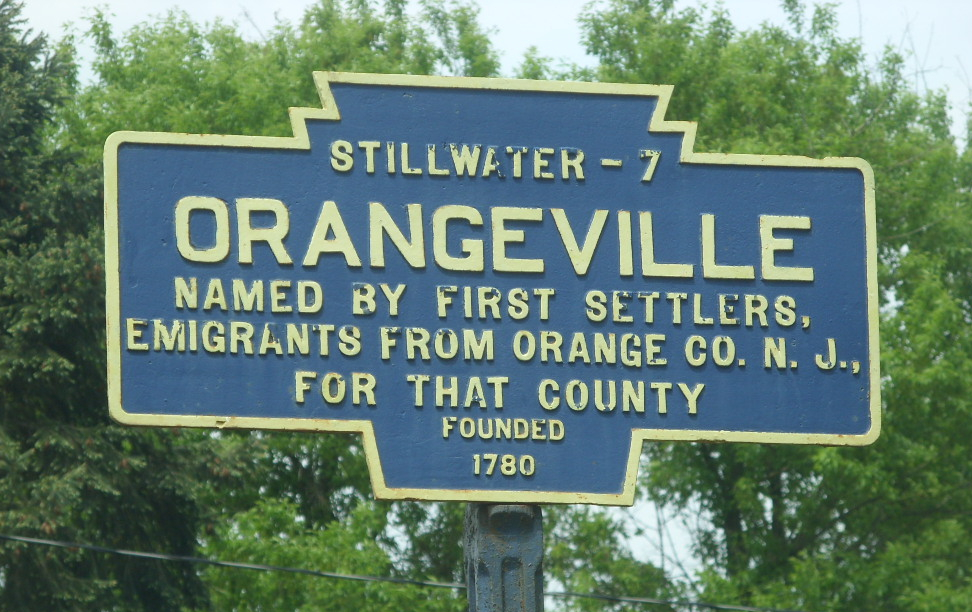
- Keystone Marker

- Location of Orangeville in Columbia County, Pennsylvania.

- Map showing Columbia County in Pennsylvania

- Location in Pennsylvania Orangeville (the United States)
- Coordinates: 41°04′43″N 76°24′52″W
- Country: United States
- State: Pennsylvania
- County: Columbia
- Settled: 1822
- Incorporated: 1900

Government
  - Type: Borough Council
  - Mayor: Kevin Lehman

Area
  - Total: 0.45 sq mi (1.17 km^{2})
  - Land: 0.44 sq mi (1.15 km^{2})
  - Water: 0.0077 sq mi (0.02 km^{2})
- Elevation: 580 ft (180 m)

Population (2020)
  - Total: 479
  - Density: 1,076.1/sq mi (415.48/km^{2})
- Time zone: UTC-5 (Eastern (EST))
  - Summer (DST): UTC-4 (EDT)
- ZIP Code: 17859
- Area code: 570
- FIPS code: 42-56912
- Website: https://www.orangevilleborough.com/

Orangeville is a borough in Columbia County, Pennsylvania, United States. It is part of Northeastern Pennsylvania. The population was 478 at the 2020 census. It is part of the Bloomsburg-Berwick micropolitan area.

== History ==
In 1822, an Ohio native Clemuel G. Ricketts made a plan to set up a community near Knob Mountain, although there were settlers in the area before that time. This community became Orangeville. Soon after the town was laid out, several buildings, including a house and a tannery, were erected in the area. Once five or six houses were built in the town, a post office was built there. Several names were originally considered for the community, including Knobtown, Rickettsville, and The Trap, but Orangeville was chosen after Orange County, New York, and Orange, New Jersey. In 1853, a business making plows and grain-threshers was built in the community. Orangeville was incorporated in 1900.

== Geography ==
Orangeville is located north of the center of Columbia County at 41°04′43″N 76°24′52″W. It is entirely surrounded by Orange Township, a separate municipality. According to the U.S. Census Bureau, the borough has a total area of 0.46 square miles (1.2 km^{2}), of which 0.008 square miles (0.02 km^{2}), or 1.84%, is water.

Orangeville is located 7 miles (11 km) north of Bloomsburg via Pennsylvania Route 487. Benton is 10 miles (16 km) to the north via PA 487. Pennsylvania Route 93 leads east from Orangeville 10 miles (16 km) to Berwick. Fishing Creek, a tributary of the Susquehanna River, runs on the northwestern edge of Orangeville. Knob Mountain's southwestern base is in the northeastern part of Orangeville.

== Demographics ==
Historical population
Census	Pop.	Note	%±
1880	403		—
1900	439		—
1910	399		−9.1%
1920	417		4.5%
1930	415		−0.5%
1940	434		4.6%
1950	424		−2.3%
1960	444		4.7%
1970	431		−2.9%
1980	507		17.6%
1990	504		−0.6%
2000	500		−0.8%
2010	508		1.6%
2020	479		−5.7%
2021 (est.)	478	▼	−0.2%

As of the census of 2000, there were 500 people, 146 households, and 95 families residing in the borough. The population density was 1,164.4 inhabitants per square mile (449.6/km^{2}). There were 158 housing units at an average density of 368.0 units per square mile (142.1 units/km^{2}). The racial makeup of the borough was 98.00% White, 0.40% African American, 0.20% Native American, 0.20% Pacific Islander, 0.20% from other races, and 1.00% from two or more races. Hispanic or Latino of any race were 1.00% of the population.

There were 146 households, out of which 31.5% had children under the age of 18 living with them, 54.1% were married couples living together, 9.6% had a female householder with no husband present, and 34.9% were non-families. 29.5% of all households were made up of individuals, and 11.0% had someone living alone who was 65 years of age or older. The average household size was 2.49 and the average family size was 3.12.

In the borough the population was spread out, with 20.2% under the age of 18, 6.6% from 18 to 24, 21.4% from 25 to 44, 20.6% from 45 to 64, and 31.2% who were 65 years of age or older. The median age was 47 years. For every 100 females, there were 83.8 males. For every 100 females age 18 and over, there were 79.7 males.

The median income for a household in the borough was $35,000, and the median income for a family was $43,542. Males had a median income of $31,458 versus $20,875 for females. The per capita income for the borough was $17,167. About 1.0% of families and 6.0% of the population were below the poverty line, including 2.1% of those under age 18 and 19.0% of those age 65 or over.

== Education ==
The municipality and area's local school district is the Central Columbia School District. It serves about 2,100 students and features three academic buildings and one administration building. Students are divided into the Elementary School (grades K through 4), Middle School (grades 5 through 8) and the Central Columbia High School (grades 9 through 12).

According to the 2003 data collected by Standard & Poor's, 18.4% of students are economically disadvantaged, 13.1% receive special education services and 71.1% of students pass the state-mandated testing. The district spends about $6,999 per student.

In 2007, the Pittsburgh Business Times ranked the district 146th out of 499 Pennsylvania school districts based on three years of Pennsylvania System of Student Assessment test scores.

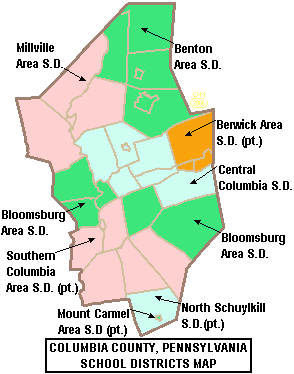
Map of Columbia County, Pennsylvania School Districts, with Central Columbia School District in blue in the center of the county.

The Middle School underwent a major renovation from 2006 to 2007. Part of this renovation included several small additions that help the school accommodate for increasing class size.
