= Scott Township, Columbia County, Pennsylvania =

Township in Pennsylvania, US

Coordinates: 41°02′00″N 76°24′59″W

- Township
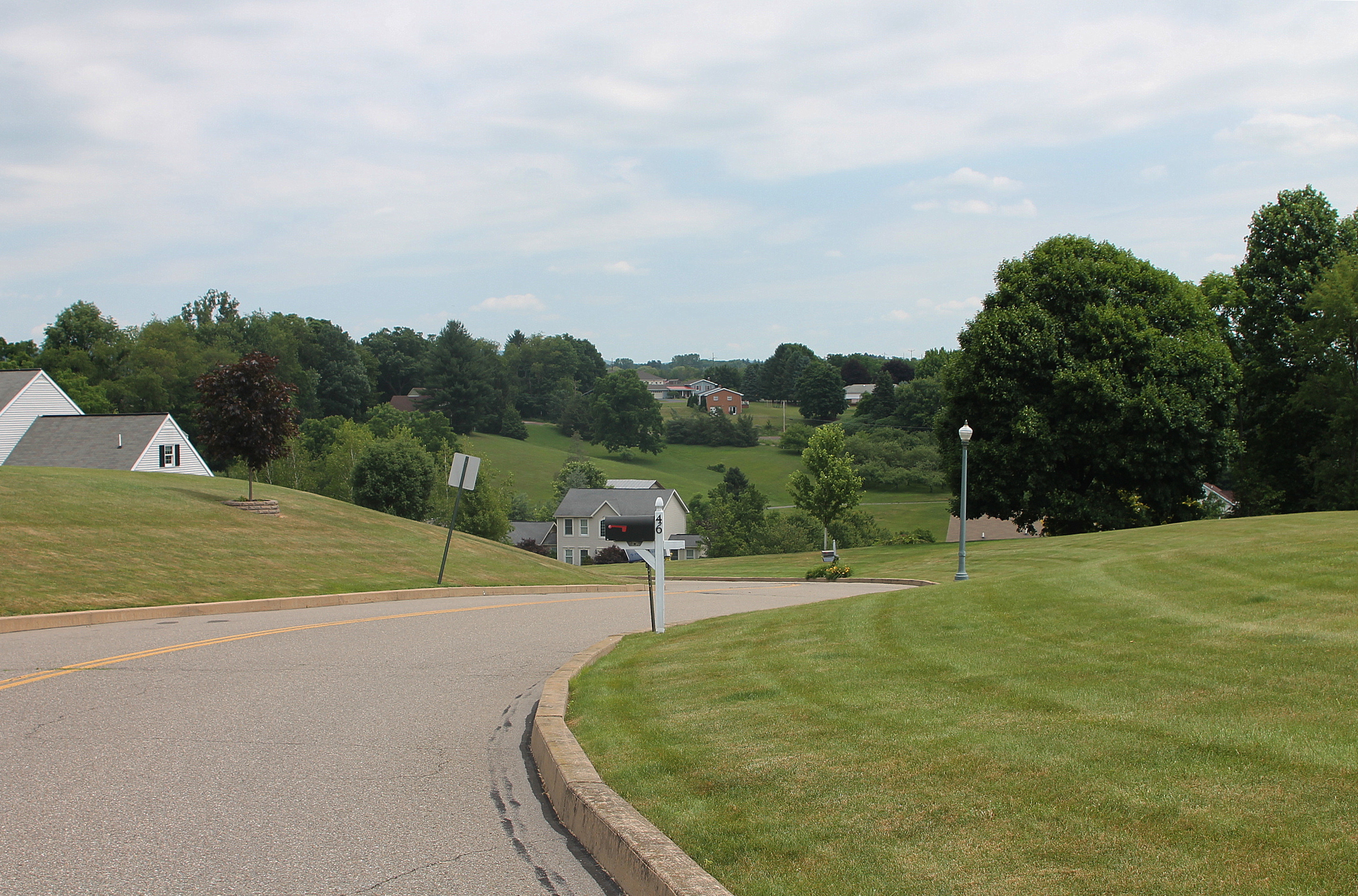
- A housing development in Scott Township

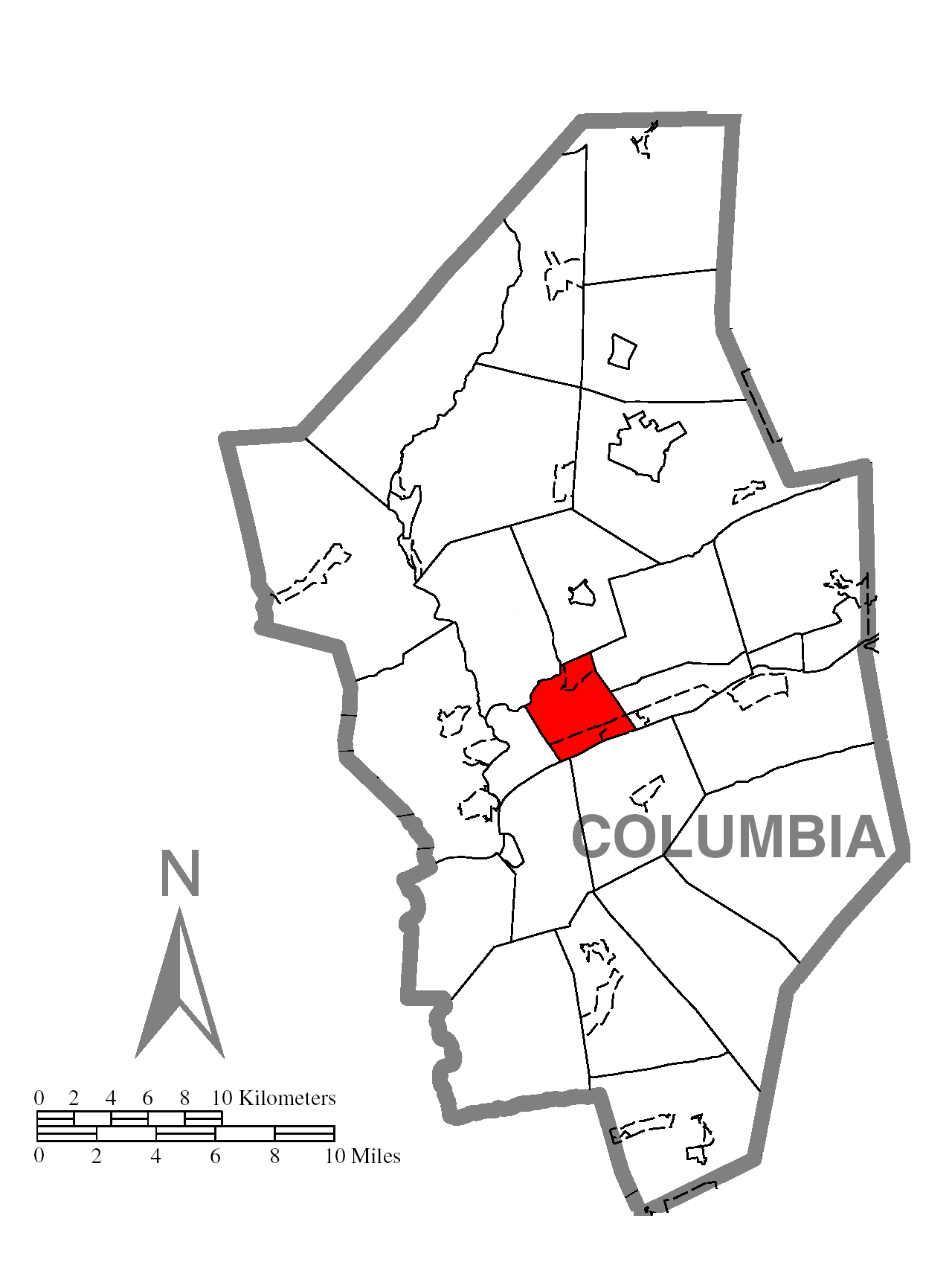
- Map of Columbia County, Pennsylvania highlighting Scott Township

- Map of Columbia County, Pennsylvania
- Country: United States
- State: Pennsylvania
- County: Columbia
- Settled: 1774
- Incorporated: 1853

Area
  - Total: 7.46 sq mi (19.33 km^{2})
  - Land: 7.00 sq mi (18.12 km^{2})
  - Water: 0.47 sq mi (1.21 km^{2})

Population (2020)
  - Total: 5,527 ▲
  - Estimate (2021): 5,528
  - Density: 721.5/sq mi (278.59/km^{2})
- Time zone: UTC-5 (Eastern (EST))
  - Summer (DST): UTC-4 (EDT)
- Area code: 570
- FIPS code: 42-037-68392
- Website: scott-township.com

Scott Township is a township in Columbia County, Pennsylvania. It is part of Northeastern Pennsylvania. The population was 5,527 at the 2020 census, an increase over the figure of 5,113 tabulated in 2000.

== Geography ==
Scott Township is at the geographic center of Columbia County and is bordered to the west by the town of Bloomsburg (the county seat), to the northwest by Mount Pleasant Township, to the north by Orange Township, to the east by North Centre and South Centre townships, and to the south by the Susquehanna River, across which are Main Township to the south and Catawissa Township to the southwest. Unincorporated communities in Scott Township include Lightstreet in the north, Almedia in the southeast, and Espy in the southwest.

Interstate 80 crosses the township from east to west, with access from Exit 236 (Pennsylvania Route 487) between Lightstreet and Bloomsburg. U.S. Route 11 runs through the southern part of the township parallel to the Susquehanna, passing along the northern edges of Espy and Almedia.

According to the United States Census Bureau, the township has a total area of 7.5 square miles (19.3 km^{2}), of which 7.0 square miles (18.1 km^{2}) is land and 0.46 square miles (1.2 km^{2}), or 6.28%, is water.

== History ==
Scott Township was first settled in the 1770s, mostly by people of English descent who came to the township from New Jersey. The soil in the township was fertile, but the biggest wealth in the township came from iron ore mining. From 1780 to 1850, there were fisheries along the Susquehanna River that brought wealth to the township. The fishing industry ceased circa 1850 because of overfishing.

== Demographics ==
Historical population
Census	Pop.	Note	%±
2010	5,113		—
2020	5,527		8.1%
2021 (est.)	5,528		0.0%

As of the census of 2000, there were 4,768 people, 2,010 households, and 1,404 families residing in the township. The population density was 671.8 inhabitants per square mile (259.4/km^{2}). There were 2,090 housing units at an average density of 294.5 units per square mile (113.7 units/km^{2}). The racial makeup of the township was 97.50% White, 0.29% African American, 0.06% Native American, 1.41% Asian, 0.06% Pacific Islander, 0.17% from other races, and 0.50% from two or more races. Hispanic or Latino of any race were 0.63% of the population.

There were 2,010 households, out of which 26.4% had children under the age of 18 living with them, 60.3% were married couples living together, 7.1% had a female householder with no husband present, and 30.1% were non-families. 26.1% of all households were made up of individuals, and 13.9% had someone living alone who was 65 years of age or older. The average household size was 2.31 and the average family size was 2.78.

In the township the population was spread out, with 20.1% under the age of 18, 5.7% from 18 to 24, 23.3% from 25 to 44, 29.5% from 45 to 64, and 21.4% who were 65 years of age or older. The median age was 46 years. For every 100 females, there were 88.2 males. For every 100 females age 18 and over, there were 85.5 males.

The median income for a household in the township was $42,123, and the median income for a family was $52,286. Males had a median income of $37,010 versus $29,063 for females. The per capita income for the township was $24,791. About 4.2% of families and 7.8% of the population were below the poverty line, including 7.2% of those under age 18 and 8.5% of those age 65 or over.

== Communities ==
- Almedia+
- Espy
- Lightstreet

+ This community is partly in an adjacent township.

== Education ==
The school district is Central Columbia School District.

Some land owned by Bloomsburg University extends into Scott Township.
