= South Centre Township, Pennsylvania =

Township in Pennsylvania, US

Coordinates: 41°01′30″N 76°22′35″W

- Township
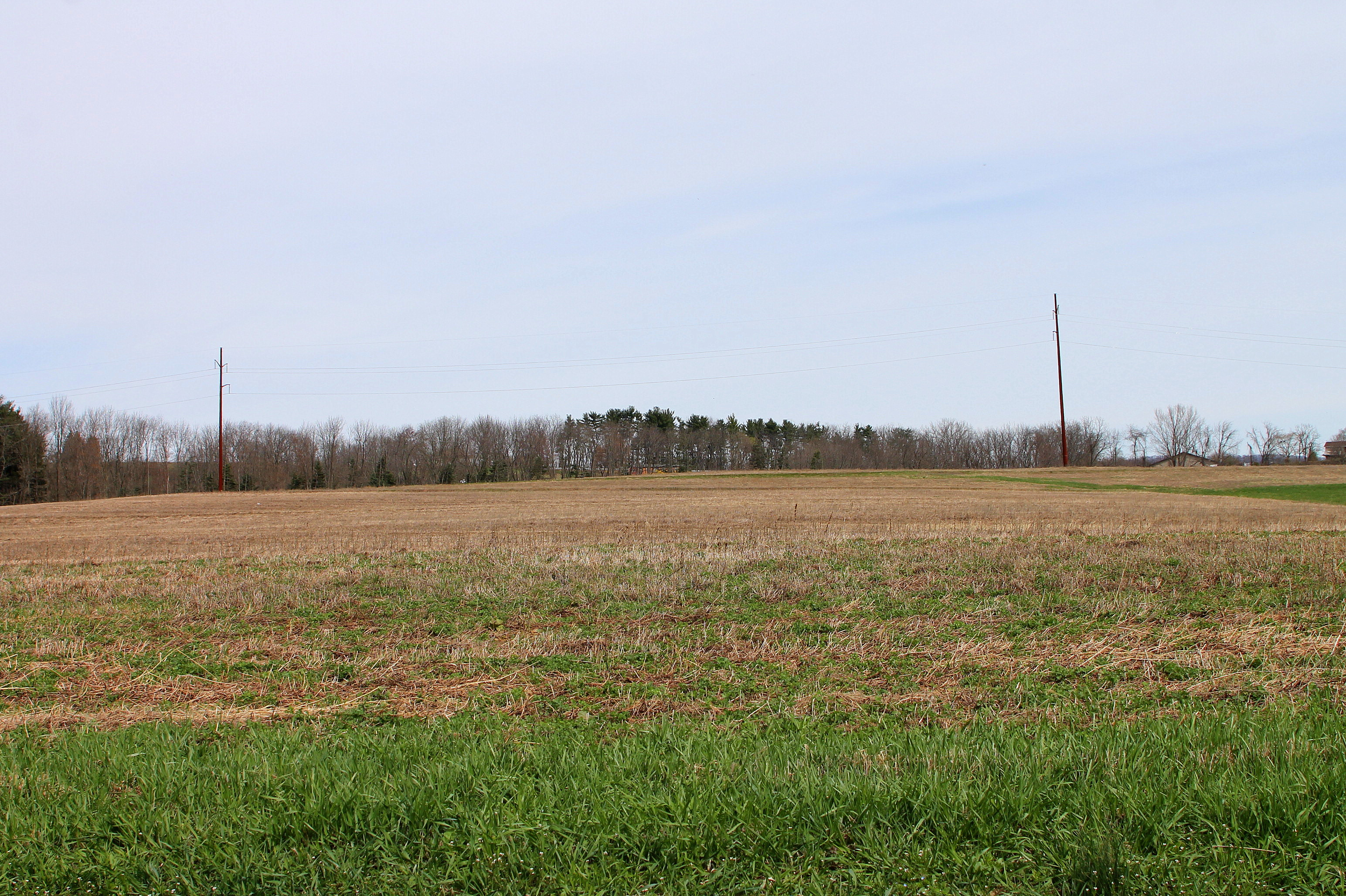
- Field in South Centre Township

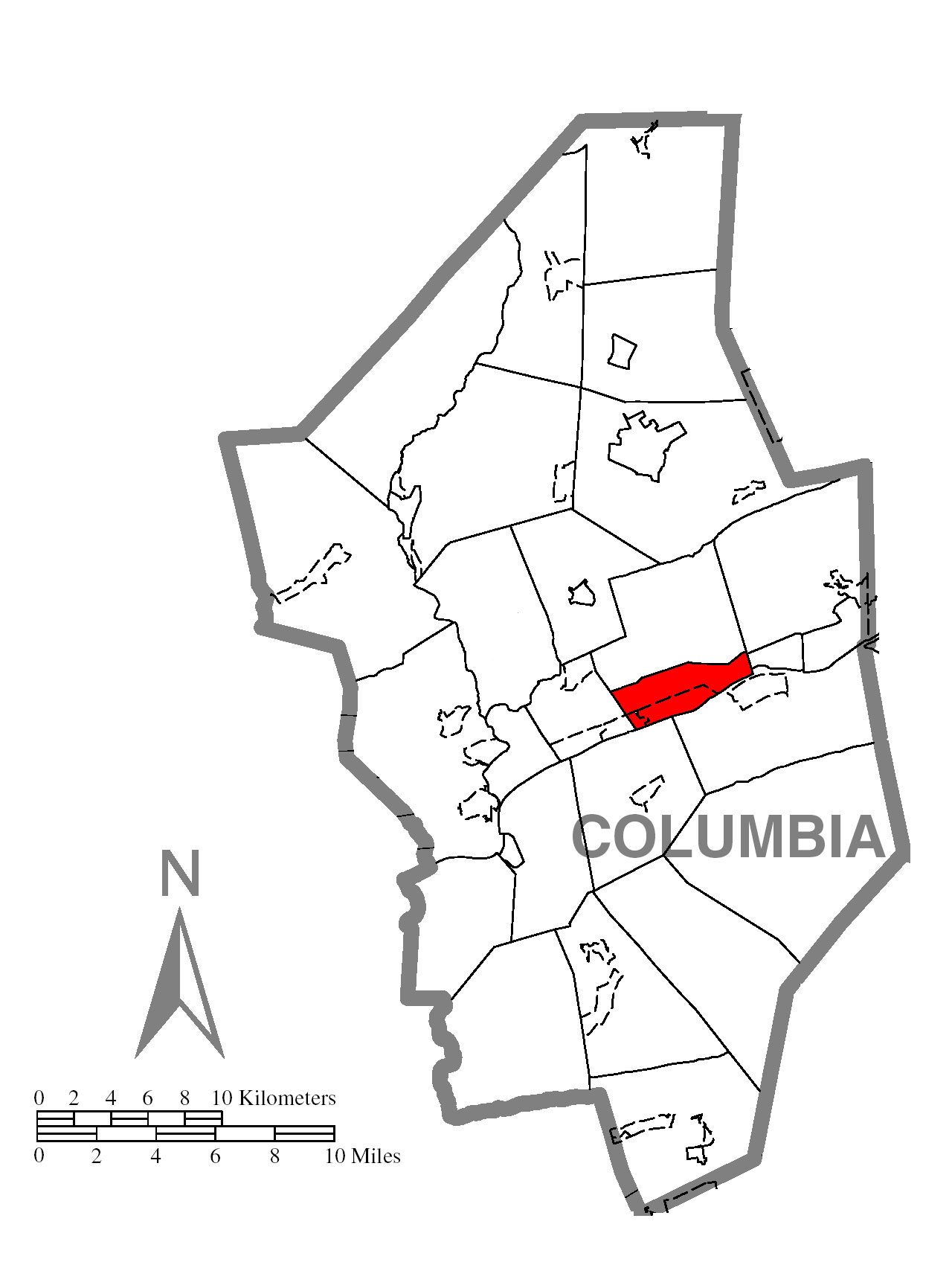
- Map of Columbia County, Pennsylvania highlighting South Centre Township

- Map of Columbia County, Pennsylvania
- Country: United States
- State: Pennsylvania
- County: Columbia
- Settled: 1771
- Incorporated: 1923

Area
  - Total: 5.96 sq mi (15.43 km^{2})
  - Land: 5.43 sq mi (14.07 km^{2})
  - Water: 0.53 sq mi (1.36 km^{2})

Population (2020)
  - Total: 1,908 ▼
  - Estimate (2021): 1,915
  - Density: 353.2/sq mi (136.39/km^{2})
- Time zone: UTC-5 (Eastern (EST))
  - Summer (DST): UTC-4 (EDT)
- Area code: 570
- FIPS code: 42-037-72040
- Website: southcentretwp.com

South Centre Township is a township in Columbia County, Pennsylvania. It is part of Northeastern Pennsylvania. The population was 1,908 at the 2020 census.

== Geography ==
South Centre Township is located east of the geographic center of Columbia County, along the north side of the Susquehanna River. It is bordered to the west by Scott Township, to the north by North Centre Township, to the east by the borough of Briar Creek, and to the south, across the Susquehanna, by Mifflin Township and Main Township. The unincorporated community of Lime Ridge is in the southern part of the township, along the Susquehanna, and a portion of Almedia is in the southwestern corner.

Interstate 80 passes through the township, crossing the Susquehanna into Mifflin Township. Access to I-80 is at Exit 241 (U.S. Route 11), next to Lime Ridge. US 11 runs parallel to the Susquehanna, leading west towards Bloomsburg, the county seat, and east through Briar Creek to Berwick.

According to the U.S. Census Bureau, South Centre Township has a total area of 5.9 square miles (15.4 km^{2}), of which 5.4 square miles (14.1 km^{2}) is land and 0.54 square miles (1.4 km^{2}), or 8.82%, is water.

== Demographics ==
Historical population
Census	Pop.	Note	%±
2010	1,937		—
2020	1,908		−1.5%
2021 (est.)	1,915		0.4%

As of the census of 2000, there were 1,972 people, 822 households, and 571 families residing in the township. The population density was 370.7 inhabitants per square mile (143.1/km^{2}). There were 865 housing units at an average density of 162.6 per square mile (62.8/km^{2}). The racial makeup of the township was 98.99% White, 0.15% African American, 0.05% Native American, 0.25% Asian, 0.05% Pacific Islander, 0.05% from other races, and 0.46% from two or more races. Hispanic or Latino of any race were 1.06% of the population.

There were 822 households, out of which 29.1% had children under the age of 18 living with them, 55.8% were married couples living together, 10.0% had a female householder with no husband present, and 30.5% were non-families. 25.4% of all households were made up of individuals, and 10.0% had someone living alone who was 65 years of age or older. The average household size was 2.39 and the average family size was 2.84.

In the township the population was spread out, with 22.0% under the age of 18, 7.0% from 18 to 24, 29.2% from 25 to 44, 26.5% from 45 to 64, and 15.3% who were 65 years of age or older. The median age was 40 years. For every 100 females, there were 95.2 males. For every 100 females age 18 and over, there were 90.3 males.

The median income for a household in the township was $34,764, and the median income for a family was $40,395. Males had a median income of $27,875 versus $21,507 for females. The per capita income for the township was $16,600. About 6.2% of families and 9.6% of the population were below the poverty line, including 12.2% of those under age 18 and 8.2% of those age 65 or over.

== Education ==
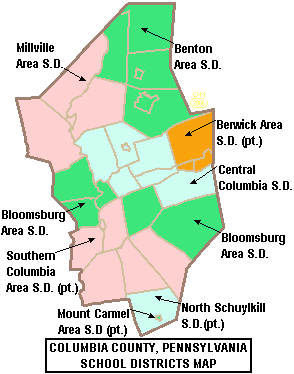
Map of Columbia County, Pennsylvania School Districts, with Central Columbia School District in blue in the center of the county.

The area's local school district is the Central Columbia School District. It serves about 2,100 students and features three academic buildings and one administration building. Students are divided into the Elementary School (grades K through 4), Middle School (grades 5 through 8) and the Central Columbia High School (grades 9 through 12).

According to the 2003 data collected by Standard & Poor's, 18.4% of students are economically disadvantaged, 13.1% receive special education services and 71.1% of students pass the state-mandated testing. The district spends about $6,999 per student.

In 2007, the Pittsburgh Business Times ranked the district 146th out of 499 Pennsylvania school districts based on three years of Pennsylvania System of Student Assessment test scores.

The Middle School is under construction, as of 2006. Several small additions are being added to accommodate the increasing class size, and a major renovation on the existing portion will bring it up to code. It's expected to be near completion by the beginning of the 2007–2008 school year.
