= Lightstreet, Pennsylvania =

Unincorporated community in Pennsylvania, US

- Census-designated place
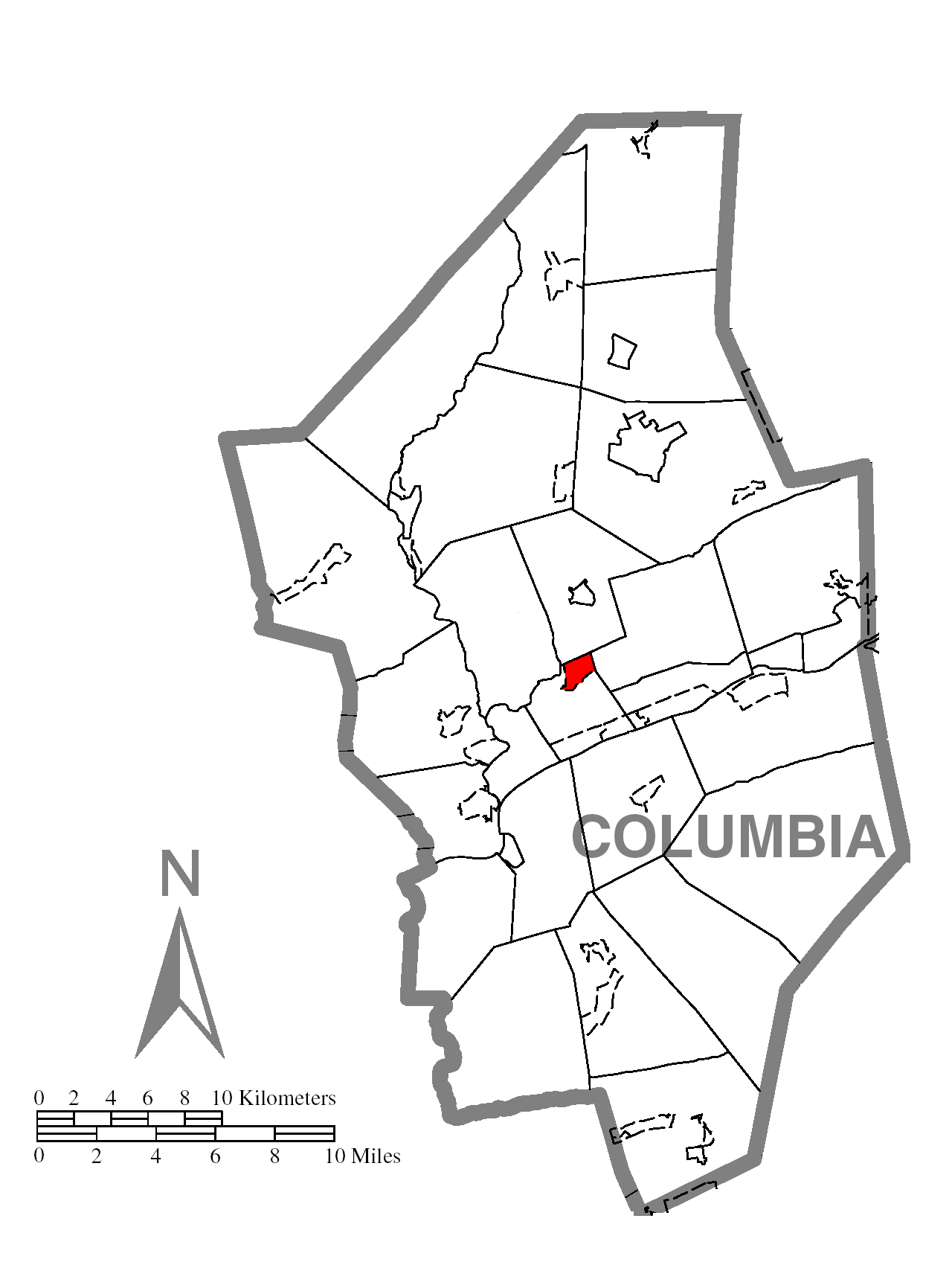
- Location within Columbia County

- Location within the U.S. state of Pennsylvania Lightstreet (the United States)
- Coordinates: 41°2′23″N 76°25′20″W
- Country: United States
- State: Pennsylvania
- County: Columbia
- Townships: Scott, Orange

Area
  - Total: 0.99 sq mi (2.56 km^{2})
  - Land: 0.98 sq mi (2.53 km^{2})
  - Water: 0.012 sq mi (0.03 km^{2})
- Elevation: 550 ft (170 m)

Population (2020)
  - Total: 1,098
  - Density: 1,125.2/sq mi (434.45/km^{2})
- Time zone: UTC-5 (Eastern (EST))
  - Summer (DST): UTC-4 (EDT)
- FIPS code: 42-43224
- GNIS feature ID: 1179322

Lightstreet is a census-designated place (CDP) in Columbia County, Pennsylvania, United States. It is part of Northeastern Pennsylvania. The population was 1,098 at the 2020 census. It is part of the Bloomsburg-Berwick micropolitan area. The CDP is named after a street in Baltimore.

== History ==
Lightstreet was originally called Williamsburg. The community was laid out in 1817 by Phillip Seidle. By 1821, the community had six residents. One gristmill was built in Lightstreet in 1823. It was rebuilt in 1868 by Peter Ent. Samuel L. Bettle built another gristmill south of the first mill in 1825. A post office was built in the vicinity of the northern gristmill by Matthew McDowell. Both of the gristmills were run by Fishing Creek's water power. There were also once two iron furnaces in Lightstreet. One of the furnaces was built in 1845. The community was also once home to two distilleries and a tannery.

Lightstreet's name was changed to what it is now in 1844 by Marmaduke Pearce. Lightstreet is now currently home to the Lightstreet little league baseball academy which is ranked as one of the top teams in Pennsylvania on a year to year basis. The Lightstreet baseball teams are the top feeder program to the Central Columbia High School Varsity squad.

== Geography ==
Lightstreet is located near the geographic center of Columbia County at 41°2′35″N 76°25′15″W (41.042946, -76.420829). It occupies the northern part of Scott Township, and a small portion extends north into Orange Township. According to the United States Census Bureau, the CDP has a total area of 0.99 square miles (2.56 km^{2}), of which 0.97 square miles (2.52 km^{2}) is land and 0.01 square miles (0.03 km^{2}), or 1.37%, is water.

Lightstreet is approximately 4 miles (6 km) northeast of Bloomsburg via Pennsylvania Route 487, and is east of Fishing Creek, a tributary of the Susquehanna River. Interstate 80 passes 1 mile (1.6 km) south of the community, with access from Exit 236 with PA 487. Most of the eastern section of Lightstreet is farmland, and most of the western part is a residential area.

== Demographics ==
Historical population
Census	Pop.	Note	%±
2020	1,098		—
U.S. Decennial Census

As of the census of 2000, there were 881 people, 405 households, and 255 families residing in the CDP. The population density was 1,098.5 inhabitants per square mile (424.1/km^{2}). There were 430 housing units at an average density of 536.2 per square mile (207.0/km^{2}). The racial makeup of the CDP was 99.09% White, 0.45% Asian, 0.23% Pacific Islander, 0.11% from other races, and 0.11% from two or more races. Hispanic or Latino of any race were 0.34% of the population.

There were 405 households, out of which 22.7% had children under the age of 18 living with them, 52.3% were married couples living together, 8.6% had a female householder with no husband present, and 36.8% were non-families. 33.6% of all households were made up of individuals, and 21.0% had someone living alone who was 65 years of age or older. The average household size was 2.18 and the average family size was 2.76.

In the CDP, the population was spread out, with 20.0% under the age of 18, 6.2% from 18 to 24, 22.0% from 25 to 44, 25.9% from 45 to 64, and 25.9% who were 65 years of age or older. The median age was 46 years. For every 100 females, there were 85.1 males. For every 100 females age 18 and over, there were 78.9 males.

The median income for a household in the CDP was $29,375, and the median income for a family was $50,208. Males had a median income of $25,417 versus $25,313 for females. The per capita income for the CDP was $19,071. None of the families and 6.1% of the population were living below the poverty line, including no under eighteens and 8.3% of those over 64.

== Education ==
The school district is the Central Columbia School District..
