= Orange Township, Pennsylvania =

Township in Pennsylvania, US

Coordinates: 41°05′00″N 76°24′59″W

- Township
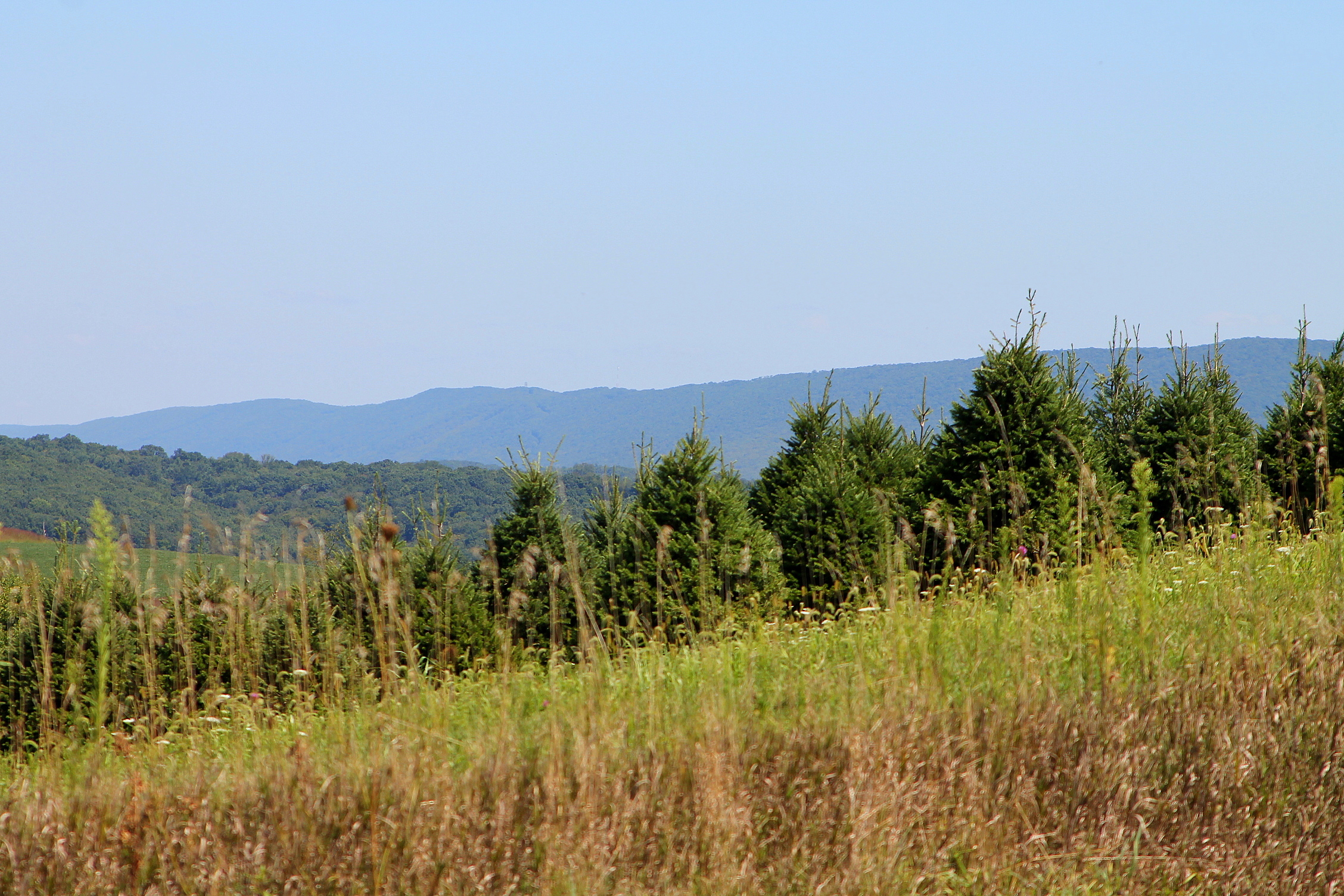
- Orange Township looking southeast towards Knob Mountain

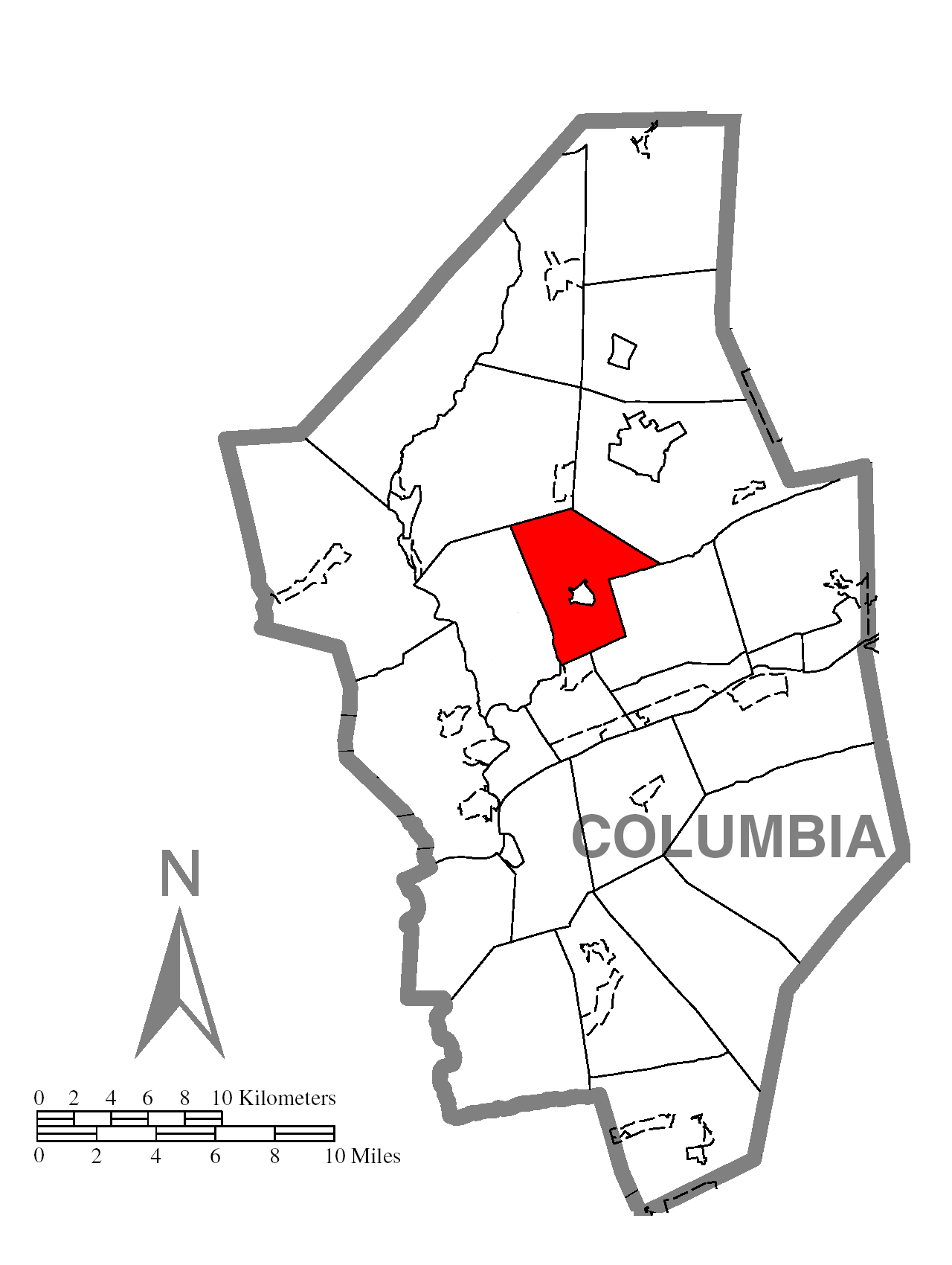
- Map of Columbia County, Pennsylvania highlighting Orange Township

- Map of Columbia County, Pennsylvania
- Country: United States
- State: Pennsylvania
- County: Columbia
- Settled: 1780
- Incorporated: 1839

Area
  - Total: 13.03 sq mi (33.74 km^{2})
  - Land: 12.87 sq mi (33.34 km^{2})
  - Water: 0.15 sq mi (0.40 km^{2})

Population (2020)
  - Total: 1,163 ▼
  - Estimate (2021): 1,166
  - Density: 97/sq mi (37.4/km^{2})
- Time zone: UTC-5 (Eastern (EST))
  - Summer (DST): UTC-4 (EDT)
- Area code: 570
- FIPS code: 42-037-56896
- Website: https://www.orangetwppa.org/

Orange Township is a township in Columbia County, Pennsylvania. It is part of Northeastern Pennsylvania. The population was 1,163 at the 2020 census.

== History ==
The Patterson Covered Bridge No. 112 was listed on the National Register of Historic Places in 1979.

== Geography ==
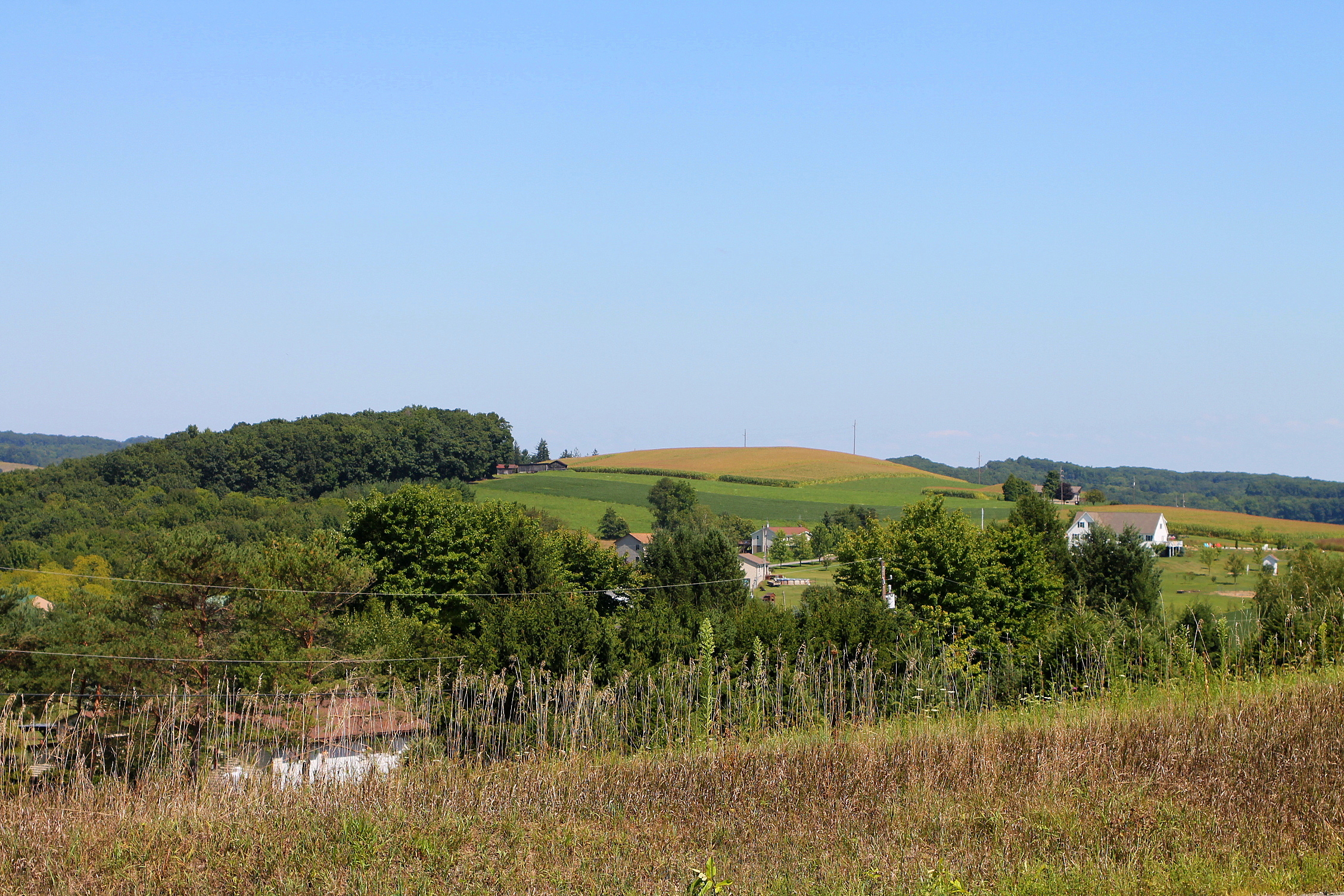
View of Orange Township looking east from Bowmans Mill Road

Orange Township is located just north of the center of Columbia County and surrounds the borough of Orangeville, a separate municipality. According to the United States Census Bureau, the township has a total area of 13.0 square miles (33.7 km^{2}), of which 12.9 square miles (33.3 km^{2}) is land and 0.2 square miles (0.4 km^{2}), or 1.18%, is water. Fishing Creek, a tributary of the Susquehanna River, crosses the township from east to west and forms part of the southwestern boundary. Knob Mountain forms part of the township boundary in the east. The township contains part of the census-designated place of Lightstreet.

== Demographics ==
Historical population
Census	Pop.	Note	%±
2010	1,257		—
2020	1,163		−7.5%
2021 (est.)	1,166		0.3%

As of the census of 2000, there were 1,148 people, 435 households, and 344 families residing in the township. The population density was 87.9 inhabitants per square mile (33.9/km^{2}). There were 532 housing units at an average density of 40.8 per square mile (15.8/km^{2}). The racial makeup of the township was 99.65% White, 0.09% African American, 0.09% Asian, and 0.17% from two or more races. Hispanic or Latino of any race were 0.17% of the population.

There were 435 households, out of which 36.3% had children under the age of 18 living with them, 72.9% were married couples living together, 3.2% had a female householder with no husband present, and 20.9% were non-families. 18.2% of all households were made up of individuals, and 8.3% had someone living alone who was 65 years of age or older. The average household size was 2.64 and the average family size was 3.01.

In the township the population was spread out, with 25.7% under the age of 18, 5.1% from 18 to 24, 29.8% from 25 to 44, 27.6% from 45 to 64, and 11.8% who were 65 years of age or older. The median age was 40 years. For every 100 females, there were 98.6 males. For every 100 females age 18 and over, there were 98.8 males.

The median income for a household in the township was $52,917, and the median income for a family was $56,875. Males had a median income of $34,917 versus $24,375 for females. The per capita income for the township was $22,608. About 5.0% of families and 5.5% of the population were below the poverty line, including 2.0% of those under age 18 and 5.2% of those age 65 or over.

== Education ==
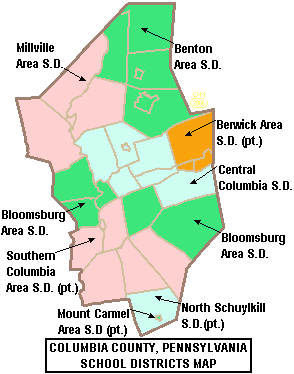
Map of Columbia County, Pennsylvania School Districts, with Central Columbia School District in blue in the center of the county.

The area's local school district is the Central Columbia School District. It serves about 2,100 students and features three academic buildings and one administration building. Students are divided into the Elementary School (grades K through 4), Middle School (grades 5 through 8) and the Central Columbia High School (grades 9 through 12).

According to the 2003 data collected by Standard & Poor's, 18.4% of students are economically disadvantaged, 13.1% receive special education services and 71.1% of students pass the state-mandated testing. The district spends about $6,999 per student.

In 2007, the Pittsburgh Business Times ranked the district 146th out of 499 Pennsylvania school districts based on three years of Pennsylvania System of Student Assessment test scores.

As of 2006 the Middle School was under construction. Several small additions were being added to accommodate the increasing class size, and a major renovation on the existing portion was to bring it up to code. It was expected to be near completion by the beginning of the 2007–08 school year.
