= Mifflin Township, Columbia County, Pennsylvania =

Township in Pennsylvania, US

Coordinates: 41°02′00″N 76°15′59″W

- Township
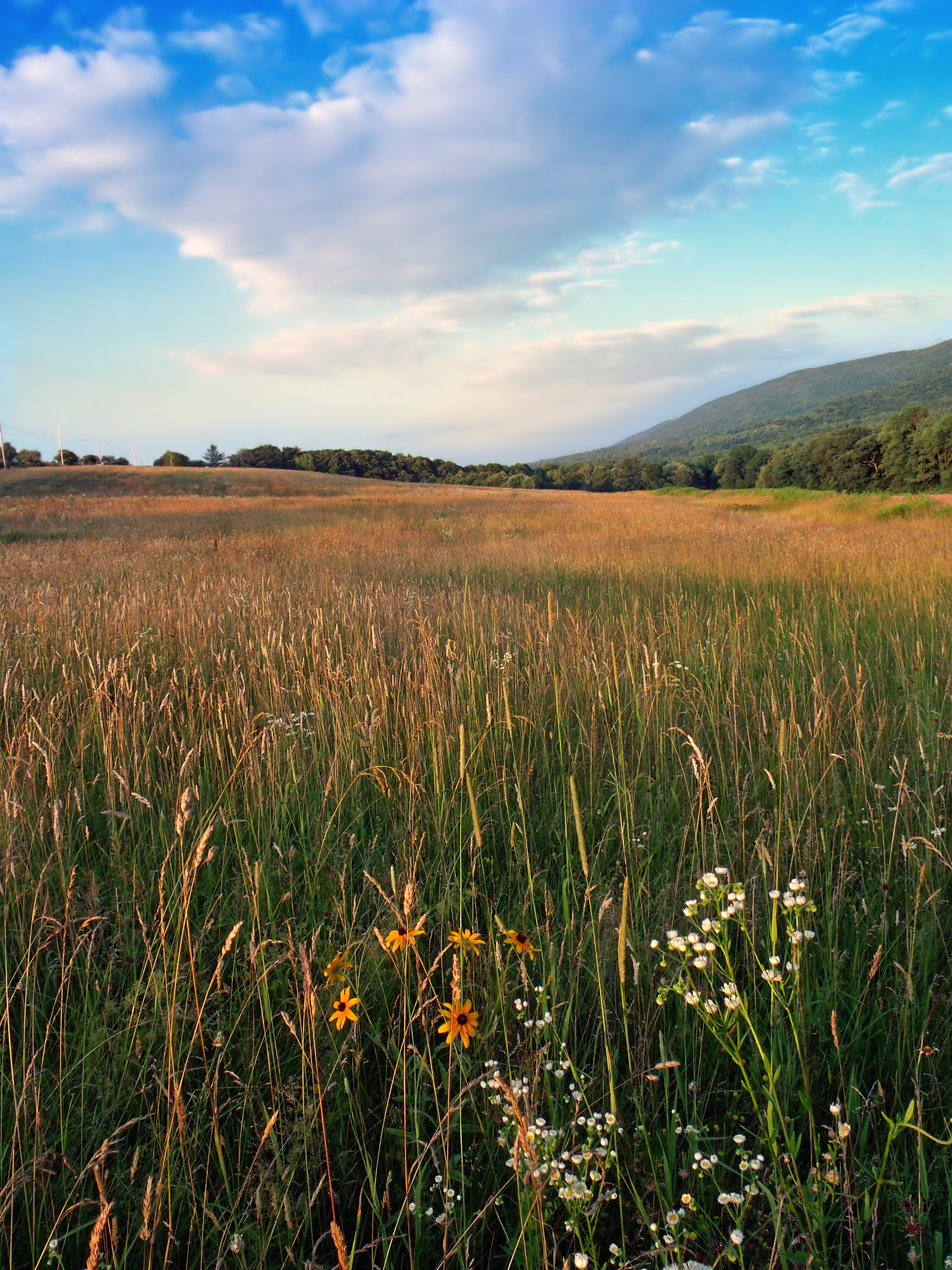
- A Mifflin Township vista

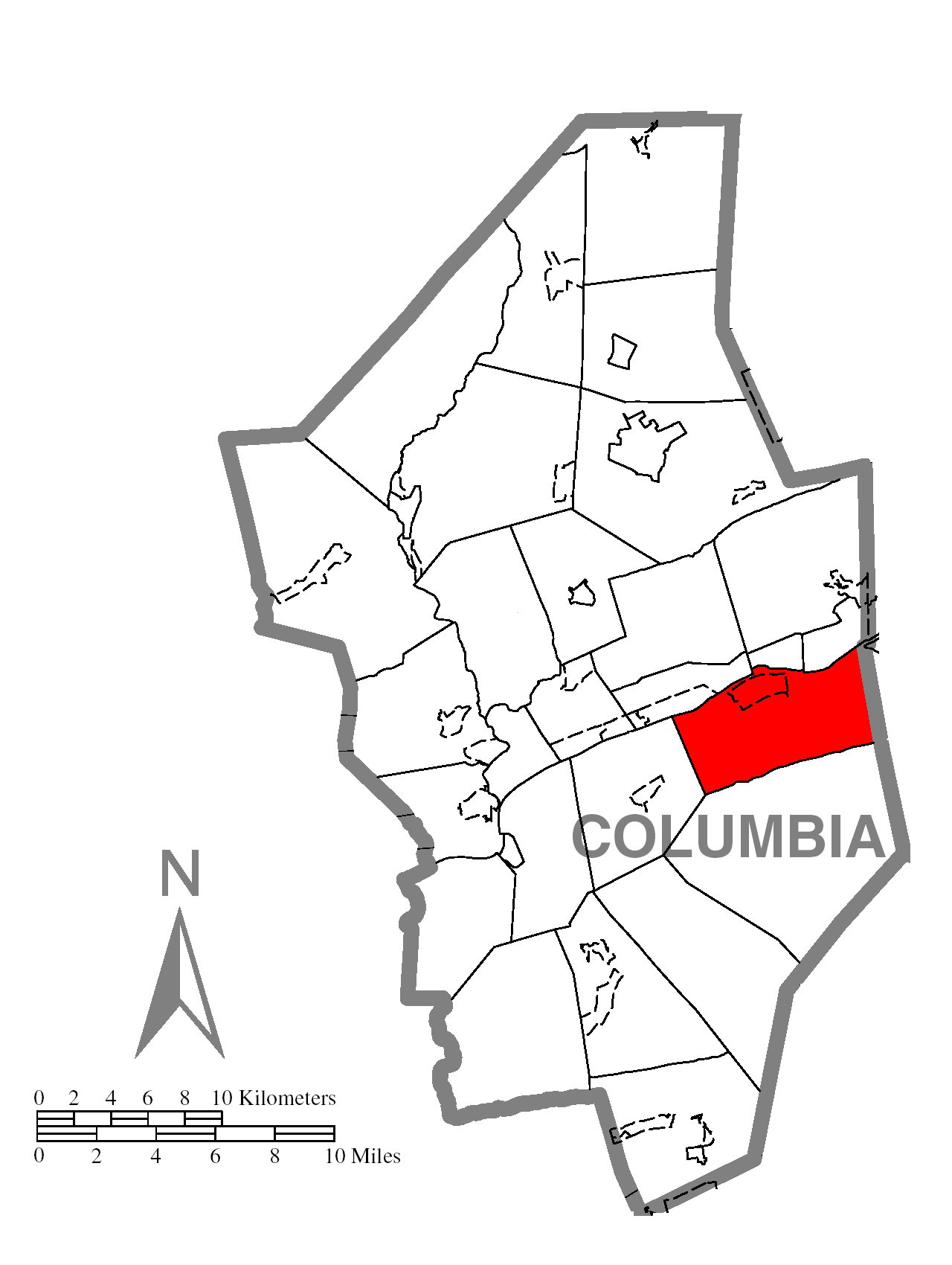
- Map of Columbia County, Pennsylvania highlighting Mifflin Township

- Map of Columbia County, Pennsylvania
- Country: United States
- State: Pennsylvania
- County: Columbia
- Settled: 1779
- Incorporated: 1799

Area
  - Total: 19.86 sq mi (51.44 km^{2})
  - Land: 19.22 sq mi (49.78 km^{2})
  - Water: 0.64 sq mi (1.66 km^{2})

Population (2020)
  - Total: 2,277 ▼
  - Estimate (2021): 2,296
  - Density: 119.0/sq mi (45.94/km^{2})
- Time zone: UTC-5 (Eastern (EST))
  - Summer (DST): UTC-4 (EDT)
- Area code: 570
- FIPS code: 42-037-49256
- Website: https://mifflintwp.org/

Mifflin Township is a township in Columbia County, Pennsylvania. It is part of Northeastern Pennsylvania. The population was 2,277 at the 2020 census.

== Geography ==
Mifflin Township is in eastern Columbia County, bordered by Luzerne County on the east. The Susquehanna River forms the northern border of the township, and the ridgeline of Nescopeck Mountain is the southern border. The unincorporated community of Mifflinville along the Susquehanna is the main settlement in the township. Hetlerville is a small unincorporated community in the eastern part of the township.

According to the U.S. Census Bureau, the township has a total area of 19.8 square miles (51.4 km^{2}), of which 19.2 square miles (49.8 km^{2}) is land and 0.66 square miles (1.7 km^{2}), or 3.23%, is water. Interstate 80 (Keystone Shortway) runs east and west through the township with an exit at Pennsylvania Route 339, southwest of Mifflinville.

== History ==
The first European settlers probably arrived in the area that is now Mifflin Township in the late 1770s, although the exact date cannot be determined. In 1799, the township was formed from part of Catawissa Township and named for Thomas Mifflin, governor of Pennsylvania. Mifflin Township historically did not have much industrial business, because of the lack of transportation until the construction of the North and West Branch Railroad. However, a gunpowder factory was erected in the township in 1855, although it was destroyed less than three days later in an explosion.

== Demographics ==
Historical population
Census	Pop.	Note	%±
2010	2,322		—
2020	2,277		−1.9%
2021 (est.)	2,296		0.8%

As of the census of 2000, there were 2,251 people, 899 households, and 674 families residing in the township. The population density was 117.4 inhabitants per square mile (45.3/km^{2}). There were 953 housing units at an average density of 49.7 units per square mile (19.2 units/km^{2}). The racial makeup of the township was 98.71% White, 0.18% Native American, 0.71% Asian, and 0.40% from two or more races. Hispanic or Latino of any race were 0.22% of the population.

There were 899 households, out of which 30.8% had children under the age of 18 living with them, 63.5% were married couples living together, 7.6% had a female householder with no husband present, and 25.0% were non-families. 21.6% of all households were made up of individuals, and 9.8% had someone living alone who was 65 years of age or older. The average household size was 2.50 and the average family size was 2.92.

In the township the population was spread out, with 23.2% under the age of 18, 6.1% from 18 to 24, 29.7% from 25 to 44, 26.7% from 45 to 64, and 14.3% who were 65 years of age or older. The median age was 40 years. For every 100 females, there were 96.9 males. For every 100 females age 18 and over, there were 94.1 males.

The median income for a household in the township was $37,083, and the median income for a family was $41,439. Males had a median income of $31,097 versus $21,213 for females. The per capita income for the township was $17,844. About 4.4% of families and 4.8% of the population were below the poverty line, including 3.0% of those under age 18 and 7.5% of those age 65 or over.

== Education ==
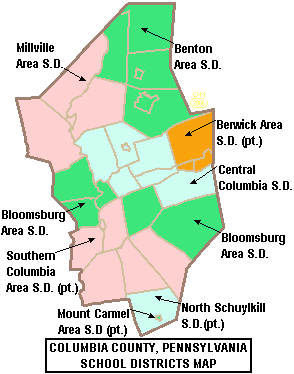
Map of Columbia County, Pennsylvania School Districts, with Central Columbia School District in blue in the center of the county

The area's local school district is the Central Columbia School District. It serves about 2,100 students and features three academic buildings and one administration building. Students are divided into the Elementary School (grades K through 4), Middle School (grades 5 through 8) and the Central Columbia High School (grades 9 through 12).

According to the 2003 data collected by Standard & Poor's, 18.4% of students are economically disadvantaged, 13.1% receive special education services and 71.1% of students pass the state-mandated testing. The district spends about $6,999 per student.

In 2007, the Pittsburgh Business Times ranked the district 146th out of 499 Pennsylvania school districts based on three years of Pennsylvania System of Student Assessment test scores.

The Middle School is under construction, as of 2006. Several small additions are being added to accommodate the increasing class size, and a major renovation on the existing portion will bring it up to code. It's expected to be near completion by the beginning of the 2007–2008 school year.
