= Central Columbia School District =

School district in Pennsylvania

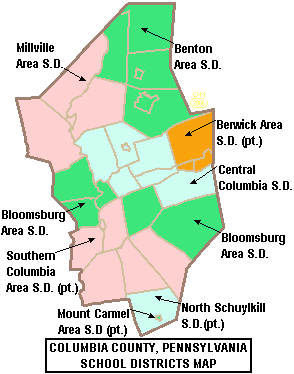
- Map of Columbia County, Pennsylvania School Districts, with Central Columbia School District in blue in the center of the county.

Address
- 4777 Old Berwick Road Bloomsburg, Columbia County, Pennsylvania, 17815-3515; United States

District information
- Type: Public

Students and staff
- District mascot: Fighting Bluejay
- Colors: Blue and silver

The Central Columbia School District is a small, rural, public school district that serves the Borough of Orangeville and Mifflin Township, Mount Pleasant Township, North Centre Township, Orange Township, Scott Township and South Centre Township in Columbia County, Pennsylvania. The district is one of the 500 public school districts of Pennsylvania. Central Columbia School District encompasses approximately 77 square miles (200 km^{2}). According to 2000 federal census data, the district served a resident population of 14,107. By 2010, the district's population increased to 14,833 people. The educational attainment levels for the Central Columbia School District population (25 years old and over) were 89.9% high school graduates and 23% college graduates.

According to the Pennsylvania Budget and Policy Center, 28.6% of the Central Columbia School District's pupils lived at 185% or below the Federal Poverty level as shown by their eligibility for the federal free or reduced price school meal programs in 2012. In 2009, the district residents' per capita income was $20,989, while the median family income was $47,805. In the Commonwealth, the median family income was $49,501 and the United States median family income was $49,445, in 2010. By 2013, the median household income in the United States rose to $52,100.

Central Columbia School District operates three schools: Central Columbia High School (9th–12th), Central Columbia Middle School (5th–8th) and Central Columbia Elementary School (K–4th). Central Columbia High School students may choose to attend Columbia-Montour Area Vocational-Technical School which provides training in the trades. The Central Susquehanna Intermediate Unit IU16 provides the district with a wide variety of services like specialized education for disabled students and hearing, speech and visual disability services and professional development for staff and faculty.

== Extracurriculars ==
Central Columbia High School offers many extracurricular activities to its students. It has many clubs, including foreign language clubs, band, chorus, and community service clubs. Students may participate in a variety of athletic teams throughout the school year. The district is a member of the Pennsylvania Heartland Athletic Conference for all athletics and participates under the rules and guidelines of the Pennsylvania Interscholastic Athletic Association.

The school's mascot is a Blue Jay. The official colors for the school are red, white, and blue; however red has been substituted across the board by silver/grey, such as the football team's helmets, which are a silver.

=== Sports ===
The district funds an extensive interscholastic athletics program.

Varsity

Boys

- Baseball - AA
- Basketball- AAA Varsity and JV teams
- Bowling - AAAA
- Cross Country - AA
- Football - A
- Golf - AA
- Soccer - AA
- Swimming and Diving - AA
- Tennis - AA
- Track and field - AA
- Wrestling - AA

Girls

- Basketball - AA
- Bowling - AAAA
- Cross Country - AA
- Field Hockey - AA
- Golf - AA
- Soccer (Fall) - AA
- Softball - AA
- Swimming and Diving - AA
- Girls' Tennis - AA
- Track and Field - AA

Middle School Sports

Boys

- Basketball
- Cross Country
- Football
- Wrestling

Girls

- Basketball
- Cross Country
- Field Hockey

According to PIAA directory July 2015
