= Ashland, Pennsylvania =

Borough in Pennsylvania, US

- Borough
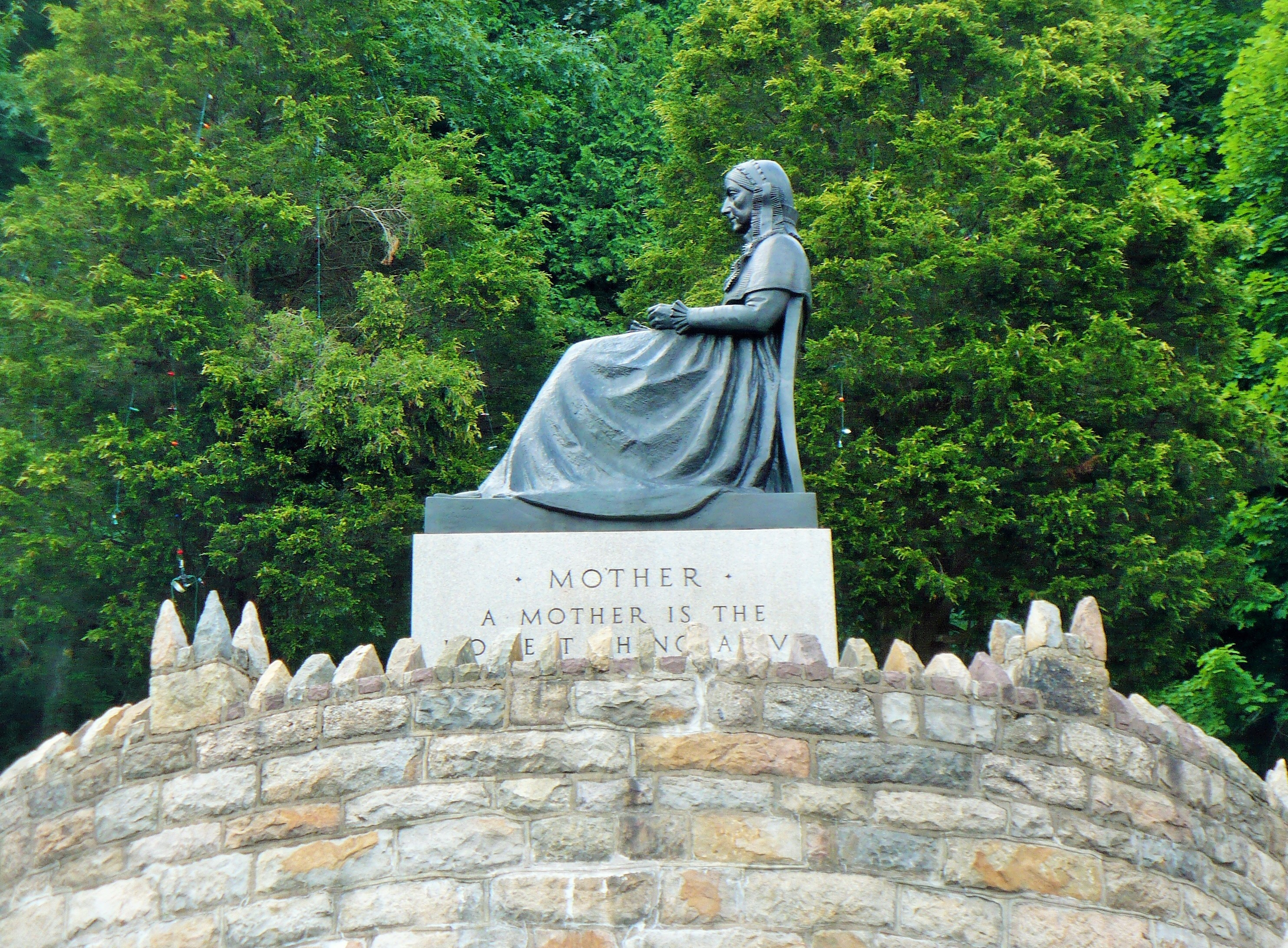
- Mothers' Memorial has been placed on the National Register of Historic Places

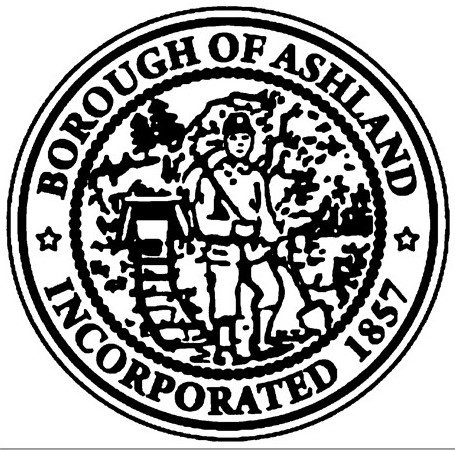
- Seal
- Nickname: Black Diamonds
- Motto: Preserving Anthracite's Legacy
- Location of Ashland in Columbia and Schuylkill Counties, Pennsylvania

- Location in Pennsylvania Ashland (the United States)
- Coordinates: 40°46′54″N 76°20′40″W
- Country: United States
- State: Pennsylvania
- Counties: Schuylkill / Columbia
- Settled: 1820
- Laid out: 1847
- Incorporated: 1857

Government
  - Type: Borough Council
  - Mayor: Daniel Weikel

Area
  - Total: 1.66 sq mi (4.29 km^{2})
  - Land: 1.66 sq mi (4.29 km^{2})
  - Water: 0 sq mi (0.00 km^{2})
- Elevation: 980 ft (300 m)

Population (2020)
  - Total: 2,471
  - Density: 1,490.4/sq mi (575.46/km^{2})
- Time zone: UTC-5 (Eastern (EST))
  - Summer (DST): UTC-4 (EDT)
- ZIP Code: 17921
- Area codes: 570 and 272
- FIPS code: 42-03264
- Website: ashlandborough.com

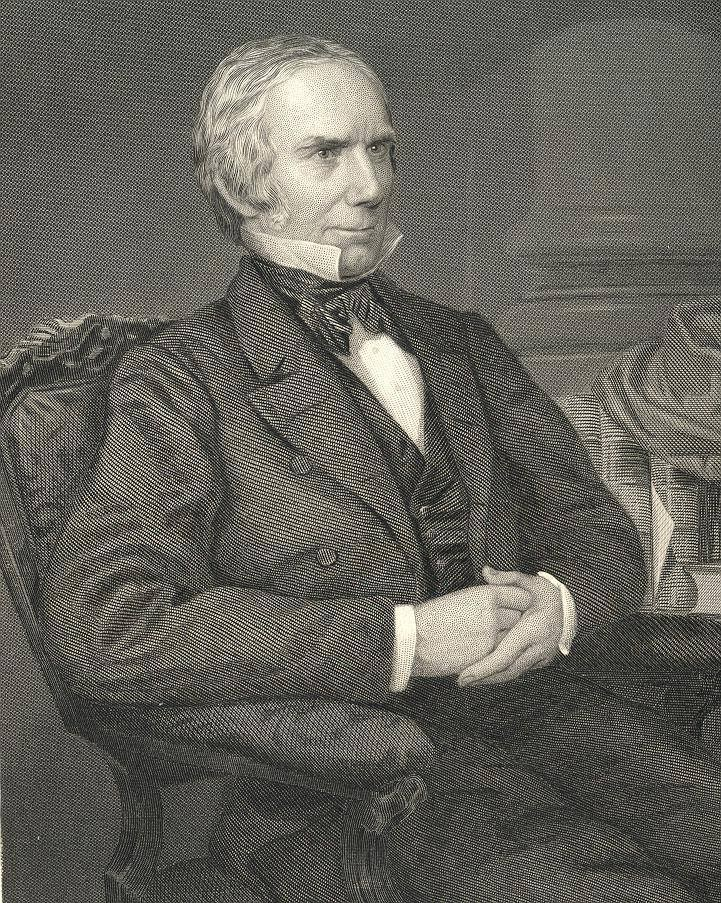
Named for Henry Clay's Home in Kentucky

Ashland is a borough in Schuylkill and Columbia counties in the U.S. state of Pennsylvania, 15 miles (24 km) northwest of Pottsville. It is part of Northeastern Pennsylvania. A small part of the borough also lies in Columbia County, although all of the population resided in the Schuylkill County portion as of the 2020 census. The borough lies in the anthracite coal region of eastern Pennsylvania. Settled in 1850, Ashland was incorporated in 1857, and was named for Henry Clay's estate near Lexington, Kentucky. The population in 1900 was 6,438, and in 1940, 7,045, but had dropped to 2,471 at the 2020 census.

It is the location of Pioneer Tunnel, a tourist attraction featuring a tour of a coal mine on mine cars and a separate 3 ft 6 in (1,067 mm) narrow gauge steam train ride.

== History ==
For a long time after southern Pennsylvania was settled, the area that is now Ashland was mostly wilderness except for a hotel in the area in 1820. A prominent citizen of the county, Burd S. Patterson, however, predicted that the area would eventually become a prominent mining town. In 1845, John P. Brock and James Hart joined Patterson in buying 800 acres (320 ha) of land in the Ashland area. In 1846, a group of miners led by Patrick Devine developed coal seams in veins in the area. However, the town progressed little over the next three years. By 1857, though, the town had 3,500 people, and Ashland became a borough, detaching itself from Butler Township. The first post office was built in 1853, and the first church was built in 1855.

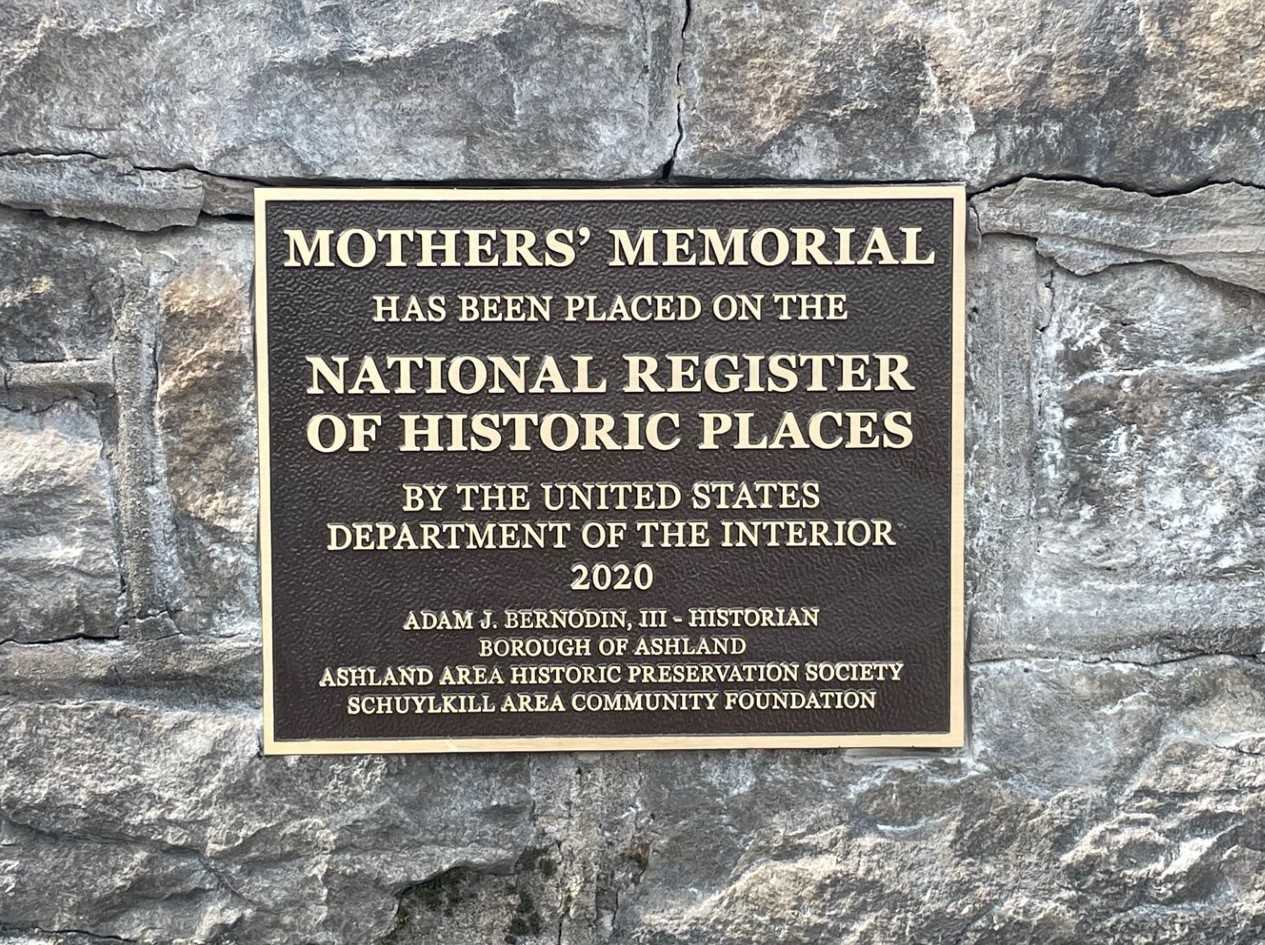
National Register of Historic Places plaque at the base of the Mothers' Memorial

The Mothers' Memorial, also known as the Whistlers Mother Statue, is located at the junction of Pennsylvania Route 54 and Pennsylvania Route 61. The Mothers' Memorial is a bronze reproduction of the famous James Abbott McNeill Whistler artistic painting: "An Arrangement in Grey and Black No. 1", commonly known as "Whistler's Mother". The WPA-built "Mothers' Memorial" honors all mothers of the United States and it's the only one of its kind in the world. It was designed by the sculptor Emil Siebern, carried out by Julius C. Loester, commissioned and erected during the misery of the Great Depression in the United States by the Ashland Boys' Association and dedicated on Sunday, September 4, 1938, during Labor Day weekend. President Franklin D. Roosevelt economic recovery plan of the Works Progress Administration (WPA) carried out the stone masonry work. On September 17, 2020, the Mothers' Memorial, Hoffman Memorial, and the Veterans' Memorial, were added by the National Park Service to the National Register of Historic Places as a Historic District.

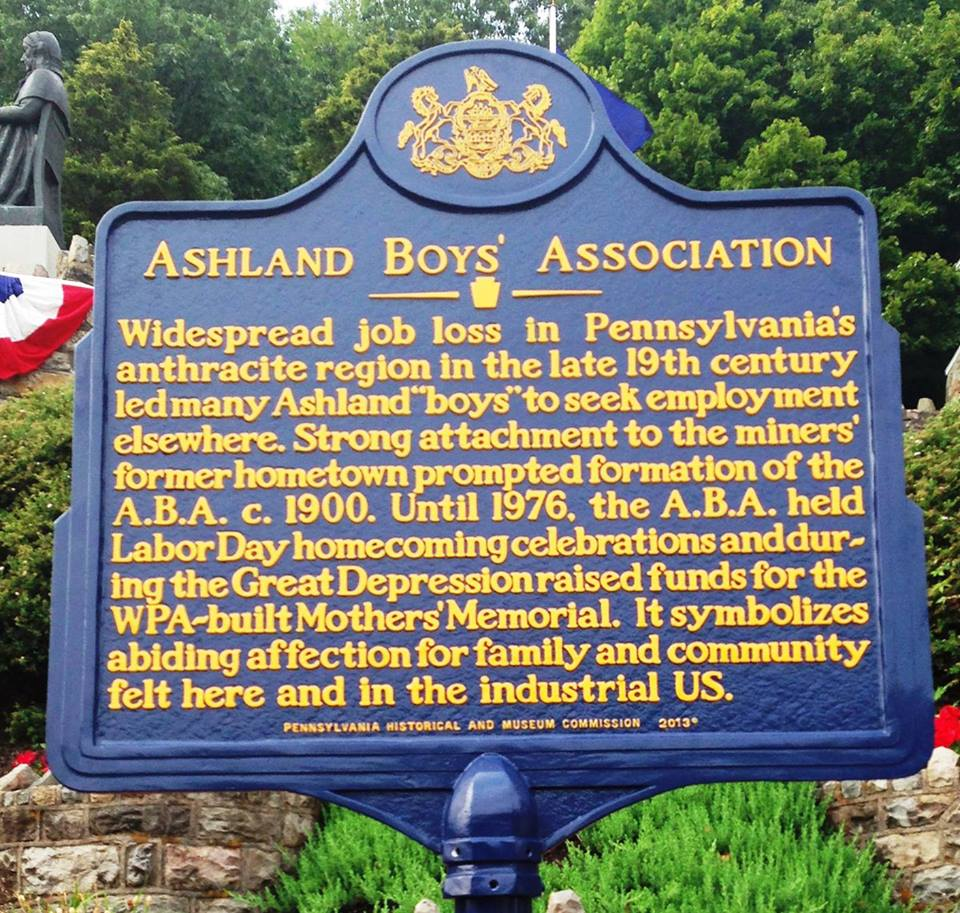
Ashland Boys' Association Pennsylvania State Historical Marker

The Ashland Boys' Association (A.B.A.) was an inspirational story of former residents of Ashland who had to leave town for work when the anthracite mining failed in the late 1800s. Ashland men returned home every Labor Day weekend for little more than a century to visit the old hometown and march in the grand Ashland Boys' Association Mummers' Parade. This unique show of attachment to family, friends, and comforts of home erected the WPA-built Mothers' Memorial statue that became the Ashland Boys' Association's legacy – an American icon and a symbol of motherhood in the United States. The Ashland Boys' Association was honored with a State Historical Marker (40.78368°N 76.33721°W) by the Pennsylvania Historical and Museum Commission on August 31, 2013. The historical marker was unveiled by Adam J. Bernodin, III and James Klock.

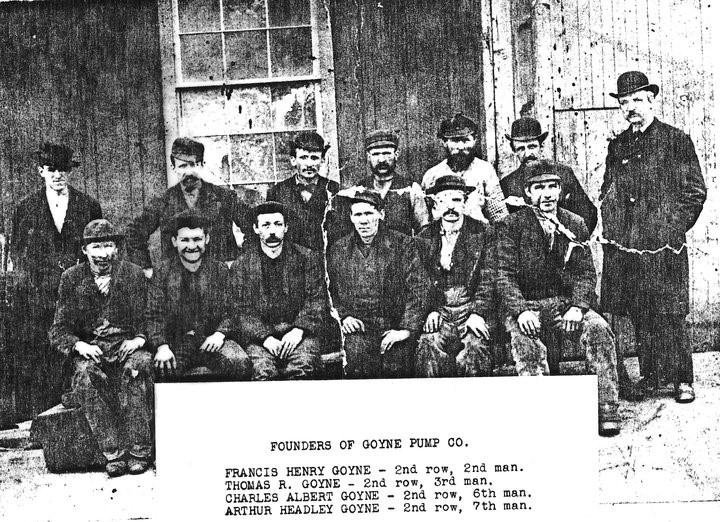
The Founders of Goyne Pump Company

Goyne Brothers was a family-owned firm that came into existence in 1881. Goyne Brothers which later changed the name in 1903 to Goyne Steam Pump Company were manufacturers of general mining machinery, and in 1883, they determined to make the manufacture of mining pumps as a specialty. The Goyne Steam Pump Company in 1911, became known as one of the most substantial exclusive mine pump manufacturing plants in the United States. The importance of coal mining drainage launched out mine pumpers exclusively and the Goyne Steam Pump Company invented, engineered, manufactured, and sold over 250 different mining pump designs and sizes, ranging from single pump up to the largest compound condensing duplex machines practicable for mining purposes throughout the anthracite and bituminous coal regions of Pennsylvania, and the United States. The Goyne Steam Pump Company changed the name to Goyne Pump Company in 1955, and the company was purchased in 1979 by Goulds Pumps

== Points of interest ==
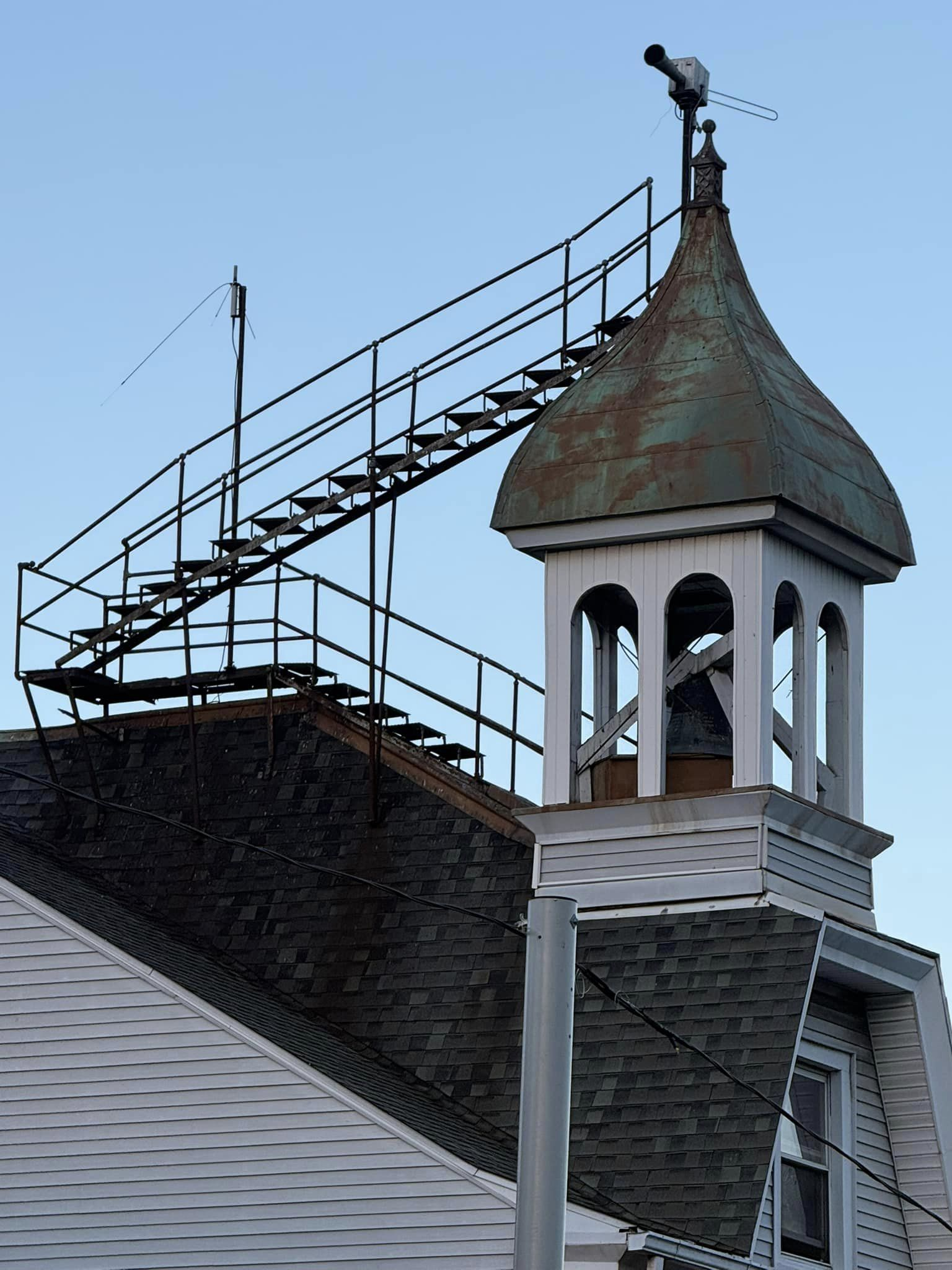
Washington Fire Company No.1 (Hookies) Historic Bell Tower and Foghorn

- Mothers’ Memorial (Whistler's Mother Statue)
- Ashland Boys’ Association Pennsylvania Historical Marker
- Pioneer Tunnel Coal Mine and Steam Train
- Ashland Area Historic Preservation Society Museum
- Station House
- Dr. J. L. Hoffman Memorial
- The Museum of Anthracite Mining
- Military Veterans Monument
- World War I Field Piece
- Washington Fire Company Historic Bell Tower/Foghorn
- Ashland Town Clock

== Geography ==
Ashland is located along the northern boundary of Schuylkill County at 40°46′54″N 76°20′40″W (40.781587, -76.344426). A small portion of the borough, constituting less than 1% of its area, extends north into Columbia County. Butler Township of Schuylkill County borders Ashland to the east, south, and west, while Conyngham Township of Columbia County borders the borough to the north. According to the United States Census Bureau, Ashland has a total area of 1.7 square miles (4.3 km^{2}), all land.

Ashland is served by Pennsylvania Route 54 and Pennsylvania Route 61. PA 54 leads east-northeast 3.5 miles (5.6 km) to Girardville and 9 miles (14 km) to Shenandoah, and northwest 16 miles (26 km) to Elysburg. PA 61 leads north 2.5 miles (4.0 km) to Centralia and then west 4 miles (6 km) farther to Mount Carmel, and east 7 miles (11 km) to Frackville. The two highways share Centre Street, the main street through Ashland.

The majority of Ashland is forest, with an urban area in the center. Most of the borough's terrain is steep hills, but the hills are gentler near the center. The southern border of the borough follows the top of Ashland Mountain, which rises 400 to 600 feet (120 to 180 m) above the center of town, except where Mahanoy Creek, a tributary of the Susquehanna River, passes through a water gap in the mountain in the southeast part of the borough.

== Demographics ==
Historical population
Census	Pop.	Note	%±
1850	224		—
1860	3,880		1,632.1%
1870	5,714		47.3%
1880	6,052		5.9%
1890	7,346		21.4%
1900	6,438		−12.4%
1910	6,855		6.5%
1920	6,686		−2.5%
1930	7,164		7.1%
1940	7,045		−1.7%
1950	6,192		−12.1%
1960	5,237		−15.4%
1970	4,737		−9.5%
1980	4,235		−10.6%
1990	3,859		−8.9%
2000	3,283		−14.9%
2010	2,817		−14.2%
2020	2,471		−12.3%

As of the census of 2010, there were 2,817 people, 1,301 households, and 776 families living in the borough. There were 1,677 housing units with a vacancy rate of 22.4%. The racial makeup of the borough was 98.2% White, 0.2% African American, 0.1% Native American, 0.3% Asian, and 0.2% other. 1.0% were from two or more races, and Hispanic or Latino were 1.0% of any race.

As of the census of 2000, there were 3,283 people, 1,437 households, and 863 families living in the borough. The population density was 1,886 inhabitants per square mile (728/km^{2}). There were 1,724 housing units at an average density of 990.4 units per square mile (382.4 units/km^{2}). The racial makeup of the borough was 99.39% White, 0.21% African American, 0.09% Asian, 0.06% from other races, and 0.24% from two or more races. Hispanic or Latino of any race were 0.09% of the population.

Of the 1,437 households 24.6% had children under the age of 18 living with them, 43.6% were married couples living together, 12.5% had a female householder with no husband present, and 39.9% were non-families. 36.4% of all households were made up of individuals, and 21.7% had someone living alone who was 65 years of age or older. The average household size was 2.28 and the average family size was 3.00.

21.1% of the population were under the age of 18, 8.1% from age 18 to 24, 27.0% from 25 to 44, 23.4% from 45 to 64, and 20.4% who were 65 years of age or older. The median age was 41 years. For every 100 females, there were 93.9 males. For every 100 females age 18 and over, there were 90.0 males.

The median income for a household in the borough was $27,234, and the median income for a family was $34,688. Males had a median income of $30,500 versus $20,920 for females. The per capita income for the borough was $15,036. About 11.1% of families and 12.8% of the population were below the poverty line, including 16.1% of those under age 18 and 13.4% of those age 65 or over.

== Education ==
All school-age residents of Ashland attend the North Schuylkill School District,. along Pennsylvania Route 61 located at 15 Academy Lane, Ashland, the physical address, in nearby Butler Township. The school district operates the North Schuylkill Elementary School (K-6) and the North Schuylkill Junior Senior High School (7–12).

The North Schuylkill School District is located in Schuylkill County, Pennsylvania and Columbia County, Pennsylvania, the same as the Borough of Ashland.

All school-age residents of Butler Township, Conyngham Township (Columbia County), Frackville Borough, Girardville Borough, Gordon Borough, Ringtown Borough, and Union Township also attend the North Schuylkill School District

Special education is provided by the school district and the Schuylkill Intermediate Unit #29.

Occupational training and adult education in various vocational and technical fields were provided by the school district and the Schuylkill Technology Centers.

== Notable people ==
- Janet Asimov, American science fiction writer, psychiatrist, and psychoanalyst
- Bill Dando, professional football coach and player
- Mickey Doolan, professional baseball player and coach
- Dennis Joseph Dougherty, Archbishop of the Roman Catholic Archdiocese of Philadelphia, and Cardinal
- Woody Erdman, American sportscaster, television producer, and businessman
- Alfred Buckwalter Garner, Republican member of the U.S. House of Representatives from Pennsylvania
- Griffith J. Griffith, Welsh-American industrialist and philanthropist
- Robert Douglas Heaton, Republican member of the U.S. House of Representatives from Pennsylvania
- Doggie Julian, Hall of Fame basketball coach
- Carson Long, NFL Player (Buffalo Bills), Member 1976 NCAA National Champion University of Pittsburgh Panthers Football team
- George Robert Patterson, Republican member of the U.S. House of Representatives from Pennsylvania
- Edmund William Samuel, Republican member of the U.S. House of Representatives from Pennsylvania
- Emil Seidel, mayor of Milwaukee, Wisconsin, and first socialist mayor of a major U.S. city
- Robert Spencer, doctor and safe abortion provider
- Charles W. Staudenmeier, Republican member of the PA House of Representatives and State Senate, Schuylkill County Court Judge of Common Pleas (1947–1967)
- Jack Stivetts, professional baseball player
- William J. Waltersheid, Bishop of the Roman Catholic Diocese of Pittsburgh

== Gallery ==
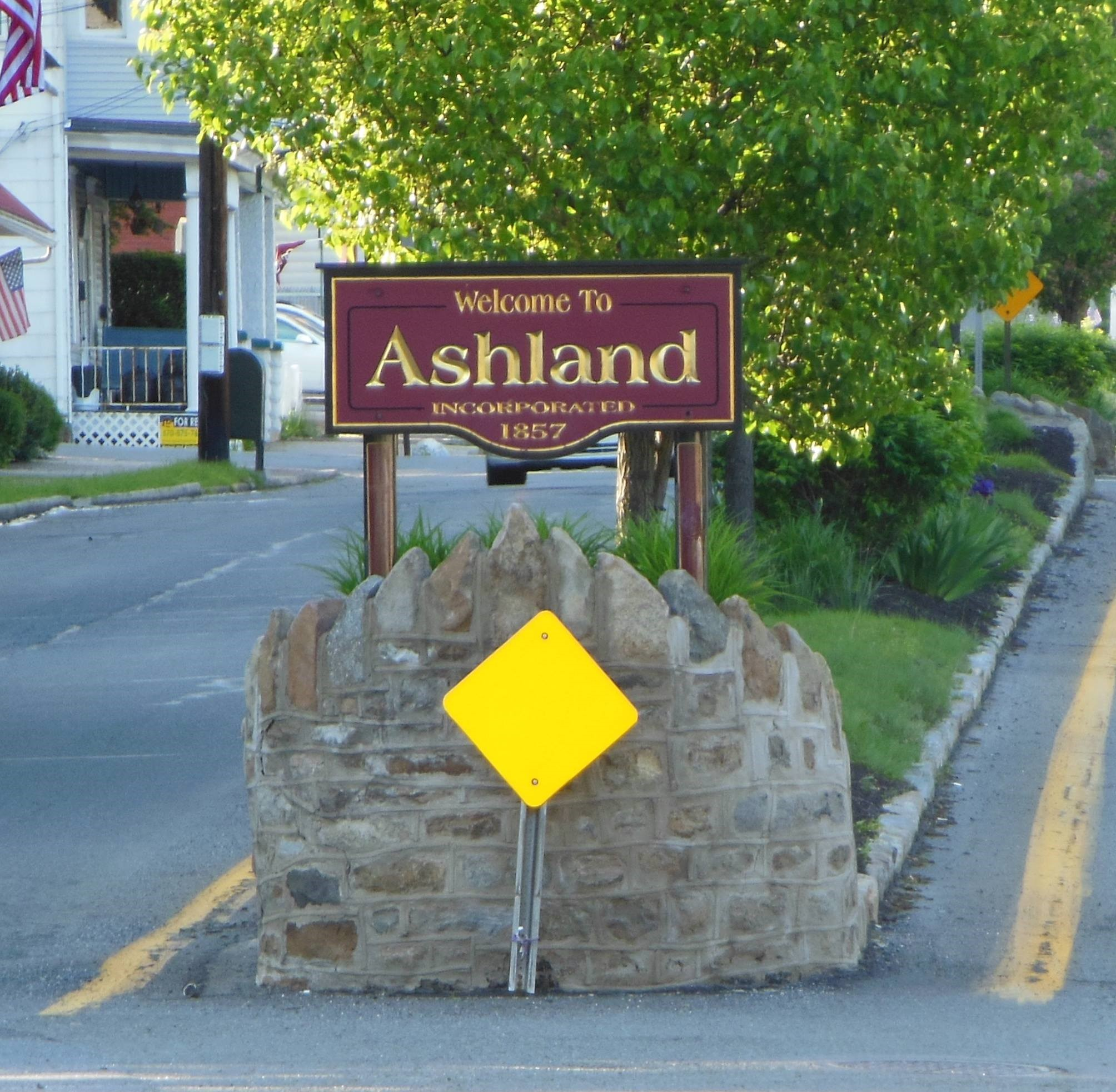
Ashland Welcome Sign

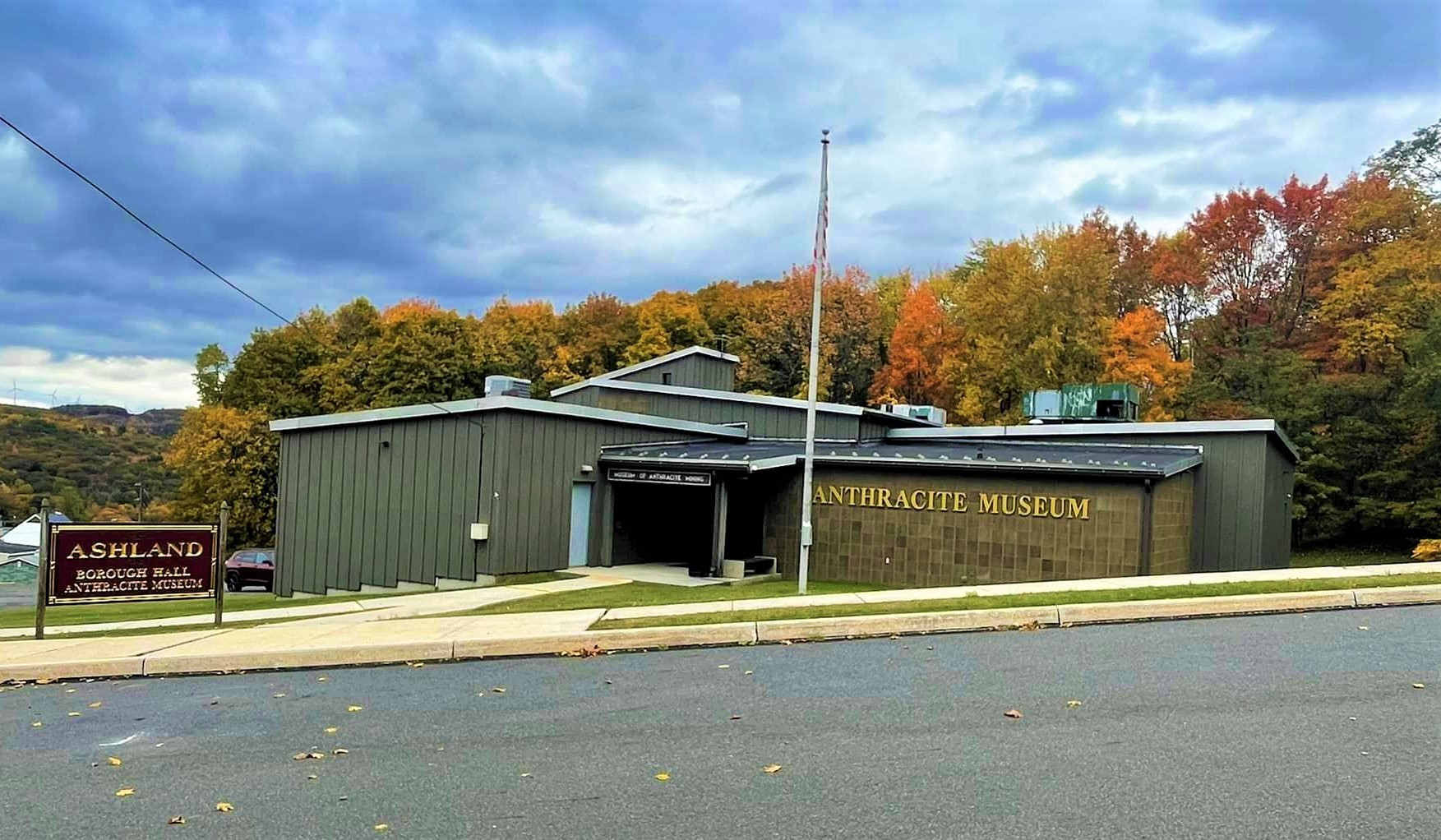
Museum of Anthracite Mining Ashland Borough Hall

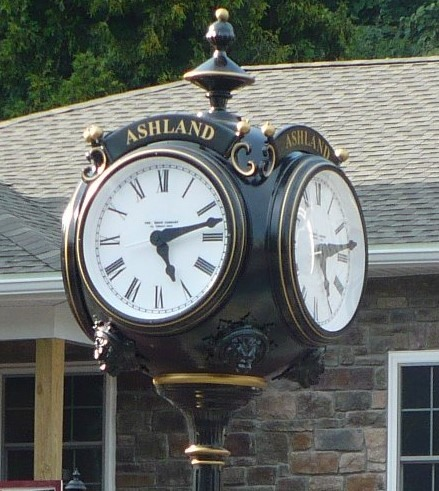
Ashland Town Clock

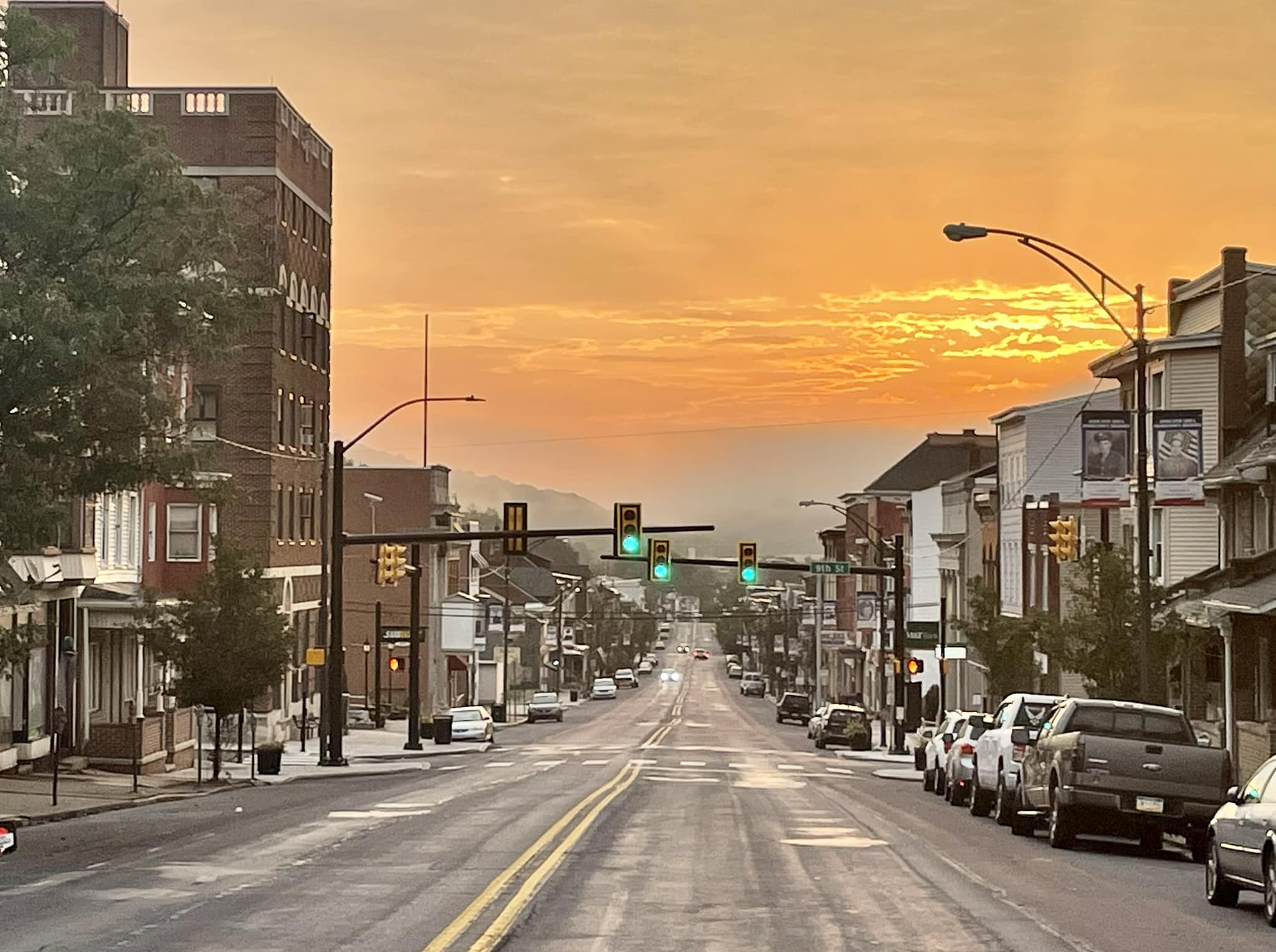
Ashland Downtown
