= Englewood, Pennsylvania =

Unincorporated community in Pennsylvania, US

Englewood
- Census-designated place
- Location within the U.S. state of Pennsylvania Englewood (the United States)
- Coordinates: 40°46′57″N 76°14′32″W
- Country: United States
- State: Pennsylvania
- County: Schuylkill
- Township: Butler

Area
  - Total: 0.47 sq mi (1.23 km^{2})
  - Land: 0.47 sq mi (1.23 km^{2})
  - Water: 0 sq mi (0.00 km^{2})

Population (2020)
  - Total: 561
  - Density: 1,178.8/sq mi (455.15/km^{2})
- Time zone: UTC-5 (Eastern (EST))
  - Summer (DST): UTC-4 (EDT)
- FIPS code: 42-23688

Englewood is a census-designated place (CDP) in Schuylkill County, Pennsylvania, United States. The population was 484 at the 2000 census.

== Geography ==
Englewood is located at 40°46′57″N 76°14′32″W (40.782437, -76.242171).

According to the United States Census Bureau, the CDP has a total area of 0.5 square miles (1.3 km^{2}), all land.

== Demographics ==
Historical population
Census	Pop.	Note	%±
2020	561		—
U.S. Decennial Census

At the 2000 census there were 484 people, 198 households, and 140 families living in the CDP. The population density was 1,013.1 inhabitants per square mile (391.2/km^{2}). There were 207 housing units at an average density of 433.3 per square mile (167.3/km^{2}). The racial makeup of the CDP was 100.00% White. Of the 198 households 25.3% had children under the age of 18 living with them, 61.6% were married couples living together, 6.1% had a female householder with no husband present, and 28.8% were non-families. 26.3% of households were one person and 15.2% were one person aged 65 or older. The average household size was 2.44 and the average family size was 2.94.

The age distribution was 20.5% under the age of 18, 5.6% from 18 to 24, 22.9% from 25 to 44, 30.8% from 45 to 64, and 20.2% 65 or older. The median age was 46 years. For every 100 females, there were 91.3 males. For every 100 females age 18 and over, there were 93.5 males.

The median household income was $35,795 and the median family income was $43,359. Males had a median income of $39,500 versus $21,875 for females. The per capita income for the CDP was $15,547. About 4.4% of families and 4.4% of the population were below the poverty line, including 7.6% of those under age 18 and none of those age 65 or over.

== Education ==
The school district is North Schuylkill School District.
