= Wilburton Number Two, Pennsylvania =

Unincorporated community in Pennsylvania, US

Wilburton Number Two
- Census-designated place
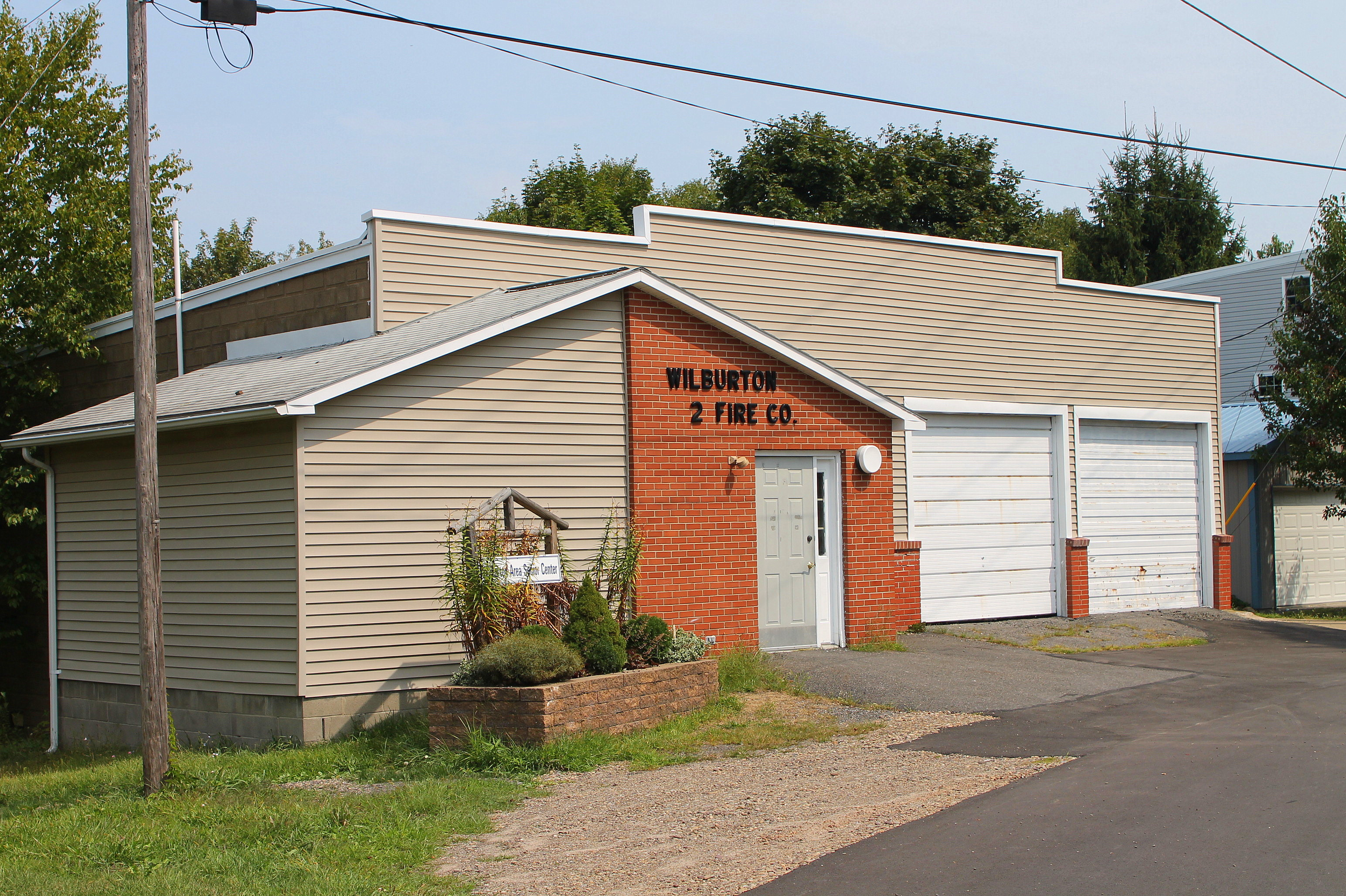
- Wilburton Number Two fire company building

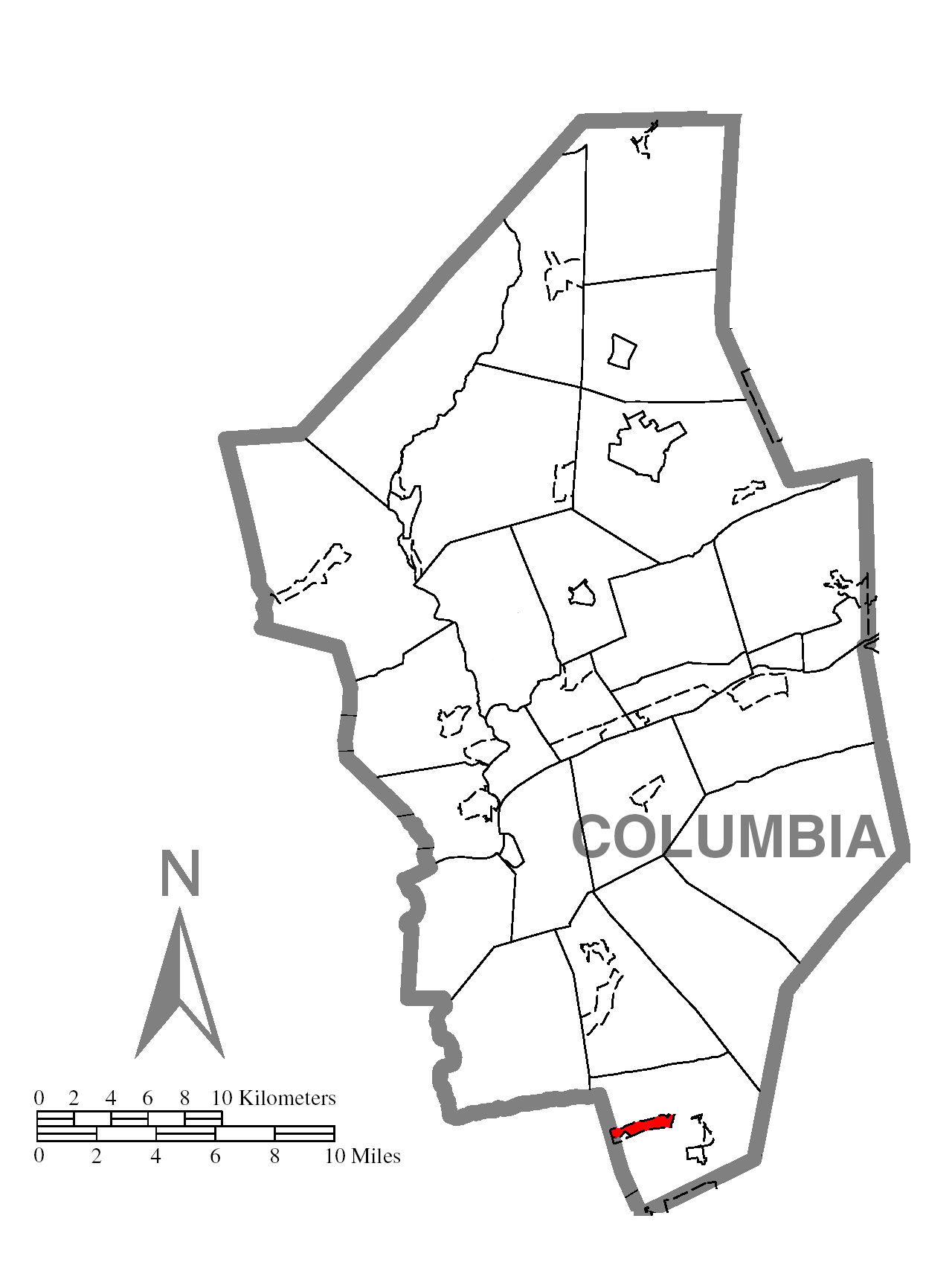
- Location within Columbia County

- Location within the U.S. state of Pennsylvania
- Coordinates: 40°49′6″N 76°22′0″W
- Country: United States
- State: Pennsylvania
- County: Columbia
- Township: Conyngham

Area
  - Total: 0.75 sq mi (1.94 km^{2})
  - Land: 0.75 sq mi (1.94 km^{2})
  - Water: 0 sq mi (0.0 km^{2})
- Elevation: 1,780 ft (540 m)

Population (2020)
  - Total: 54
  - Density: 128/sq mi (49.5/km^{2})
- Time zone: UTC-5 (Eastern (EST))
  - Summer (DST): UTC-4 (EDT)
- FIPS code: 42-85078
- GNIS feature ID: 1852866

Wilburton Number Two is a census-designated place (CDP) in Columbia County, Pennsylvania, United States. It is part of Northeastern Pennsylvania. The population was 54 at the 2020 census. It is part of the Bloomsburg-Berwick micropolitan area.

== Geography ==
Wilburton Number Two is located in southern Columbia County at 40°48′48″N 76°23′26″W (40.813200, -76.390439), in the western part of Conyngham Township. It is bordered to the west by Mount Carmel Township in Northumberland County, to the southwest by Wilburton Number One, and to the south by Midvalley Highway. The cluster of residences known as Wilburton Number Two occupies a compact area in the eastern part of the CDP, while the rest of the CDP area consists of forested mountainside and former coal mines. According to the United States Census Bureau, the Wilburton Number Two CDP has a total area of 0.75 square miles (1.94 km^{2}), all land.

Wilburton Number One and Two are both served by the Wilburton Hose Co. #1. The firehouse is located in Wilburton Number One.

== Demographics ==
As of the census of 2000, there were 76 people, 35 households, and 22 families residing in the CDP. The population density was 106.9 inhabitants per square mile (41.3/km^{2}). There were 42 housing units at an average density of 58.3 per square mile (22.5/km^{2}). The racial makeup of the CDP was 98.70% White, 1.30% from other races. Hispanic or Latino of any race were 1.30% of the population.

There were 35 households, out of which 34.3% had children under the age of 18 living with them, 57.1% were married couples living together, 2.9% had a female householder with no husband present, and 37.1% were non-families. 37.1% of all households were made up of individuals, and 25.7% had someone living alone who was 65 years of age or older. The average household size was 2.20 and the average family size was 2.86.

In the CDP, the population was spread out, with 23.4% under the age of 18, 1.3% from 18 to 24, 35.1% from 25 to 44, 20.8% from 45 to 64, and 19.5% who were 65 years of age or older. The median age was 39 years. For every 100 females, there were 87.8 males. For every 100 females age 18 and over, there were 78.8 males.

The median income for a household in the CDP was $36,250, and the median income for a family was $41,250. Males had a median income of $28,750 versus $14,583 for females. The per capita income for the CDP was $19,414. There were no families and 5.4% of the population living below the poverty line, including no under eighteens and 22.2% of those over 64.

== Education ==
The school district is the North Schuylkill School District.

== History ==
On June 17, 1948, United Air Lines Flight 624 crashed in Wilburton Number Two after hitting a high-voltage power line, killing all 39 passengers and 4 crew on board.
