= Fountain Springs, Pennsylvania =

Unincorporated community in Pennsylvania, US

Fountain Springs
- Census-designated place
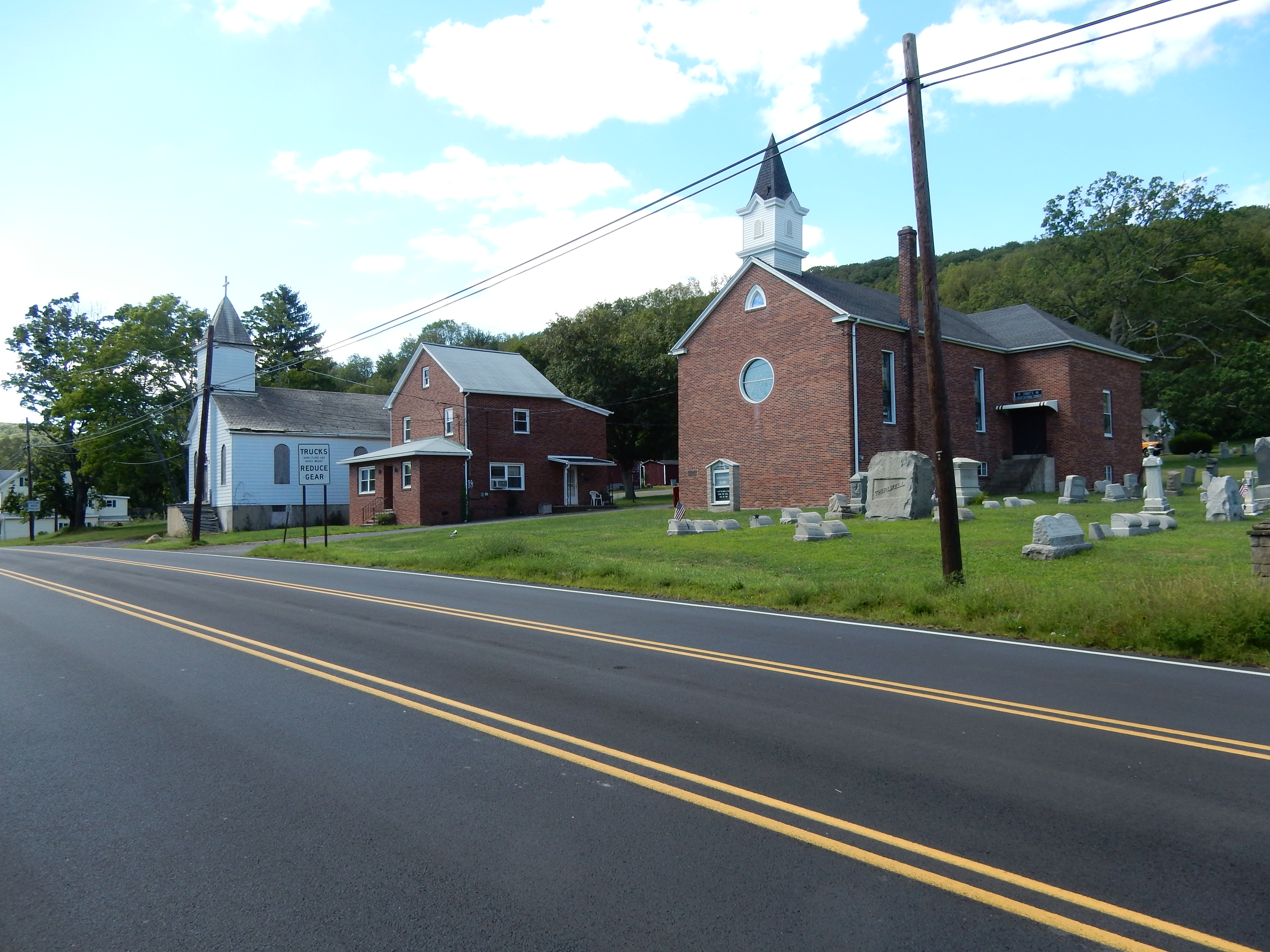
- Christ Congregational United Church of Christ and other buildings in Fountain Springs

- Location within the U.S. state of Pennsylvania Fountain Springs (the United States)
- Coordinates: 40°46′17″N 76°19′29″W
- Country: United States
- State: Pennsylvania
- County: Schuylkill
- Township: Butler

Area
  - Total: 0.56 sq mi (1.45 km^{2})
  - Land: 0.56 sq mi (1.45 km^{2})
  - Water: 0 sq mi (0.00 km^{2})

Population (2020)
  - Total: 256
  - Density: 455.8/sq mi (175.97/km^{2})
- Time zone: UTC-5 (Eastern (EST))
  - Summer (DST): UTC-4 (EDT)
- ZIP code: 17921
- Area codes: 570 and 272
- FIPS code: 42-27024

Fountain Springs is a census-designated place in Butler Township, Schuylkill County, Pennsylvania, United States. The population was 256 at the 2020 census.

== Geography ==
Fountain Springs is located at 40°46′17″N 76°19′29″W (40.771330, -76.324754).

According to the United States Census Bureau, the CDP has a total area of 0.04 square miles (0.10 km^{2}), all land.

== Demographics ==
Historical population
Census	Pop.	Note	%±
2020	256		—
U.S. Decennial Census

At the 2000 census there were 100 people, 47 households, and 29 families living in the CDP. The population density was 3,682.9 inhabitants per square mile (1,422.0/km^{2}). There were 51 housing units at an average density of 1,878.3 per square mile (725.2/km^{2}). The racial makeup of the CDP was 100.00% White. Of the 47 households 21.3% had children under the age of 18 living with them, 48.9% were married couples living together, 8.5% had a female householder with no husband present, and 36.2% were non-families. 31.9% of households were one person and 17.0% were one person aged 65 or older. The average household size was 2.13 and the average family size was 2.70.

The age distribution was 16.0% under the age of 18, 4.0% from 18 to 24, 30.0% from 25 to 44, 25.0% from 45 to 64, and 25.0% 65 or older. The median age was 45 years. For every 100 females, there were 96.1 males. For every 100 females age 18 and over, there were 86.7 males.

The median household income was $50,750 and the median family income was $53,333. Males had a median income of $27,321 versus $21,250 for females. The per capita income for the CDP was $18,890. None of the population and none of the families were below the poverty line.

== Education ==
The school district is North Schuylkill School District.
