= Locustdale, Pennsylvania =

Unincorporated community in Pennsylvania, US

- Census-designated place
- Location within the U.S. state of Pennsylvania Locustdale (the United States)
- Coordinates: 40°46′43″N 76°22′37″W
- Country: United States
- State: Pennsylvania
- Counties: Columbia, Schuylkill
- Townships: Conyngham, Butler

Area
  - Total: 0.085 sq mi (0.22 km^{2})
  - Land: 0.085 sq mi (0.22 km^{2})
  - Water: 0 sq mi (0.00 km^{2})
- Elevation: 1,040 ft (320 m)

Population (2020)
  - Total: 171
  - Density: 2,009.1/sq mi (775.73/km^{2})
- Time zone: UTC-5 (Eastern (EST))
  - Summer (DST): UTC-4 (EDT)
- ZIP Code: 17945
- Area code: 570
- FIPS code: 42-44224
- GNIS feature ID: 1179797

Locustdale (also known as "Locust Dale") is a census-designated place (CDP) that is located on the border of Columbia and Schuylkill counties, Pennsylvania, United States. It is part of Northeastern Pennsylvania.

The population was 171 at the time of the 2020 census. It is part of the Bloomsburg-Berwick micropolitan area.

== Geography ==
Locustdale is located on the border of Columbia and Schuylkill counties at 40°46′43″N 76°22′37″W (40.778664, -76.376913). It is 1 mile (1.6 km) west of the borough of Ashland.

According to the United States Census Bureau, the CDP has a total area of 0.085 square miles (0.22 km^{2}), all land.

== Demographics ==
Historical population
Census	Pop.	Note	%±
2020	171		—
U.S. Decennial Census

As of the census of 2000, there were 70 people, 28 households, and 19 families living in the CDP. The population density was 7,463.3 inhabitants per square mile (2,881.6/km^{2}). There were 32 housing units at an average density of 3,411.8 per square mile (1,317.3/km^{2}). The racial makeup of the CDP was 100.00% White.

There were 28 households, out of which 28.6% had children under the age of 18 living with them, 60.7% were married couples living together, 3.6% had a female householder with no husband present, and 32.1% were non-families. 25.0% of all households were made up of individuals, and 10.7% had someone living alone who was 65 years of age or older. The average household size was 2.50 and the average family size was 3.05.

In the CDP, the population was spread out, with 20.0% under the age of 18, 14.3% from 18 to 24, 34.3% from 25 to 44, 15.7% from 45 to 64, and 15.7% who were 65 years of age or older. The median age was 35 years. For every 100 females, there were 105.9 males. For every 100 females age 18 and over, there were 93.1 males.

The median income for a household in the CDP was $27,500, and the median income for a family was $28,750. Males had a median income of $28,750 versus $12,083 for females. The per capita income for the CDP was $9,945. There were 18.2% of families and 16.0% of the population living below the poverty line, including no under eighteens and 15.4% of those over 64.
