= Wilburton Number One, Pennsylvania =

Unincorporated community in Pennsylvania, US

Wilburton Number One
- Census-designated place
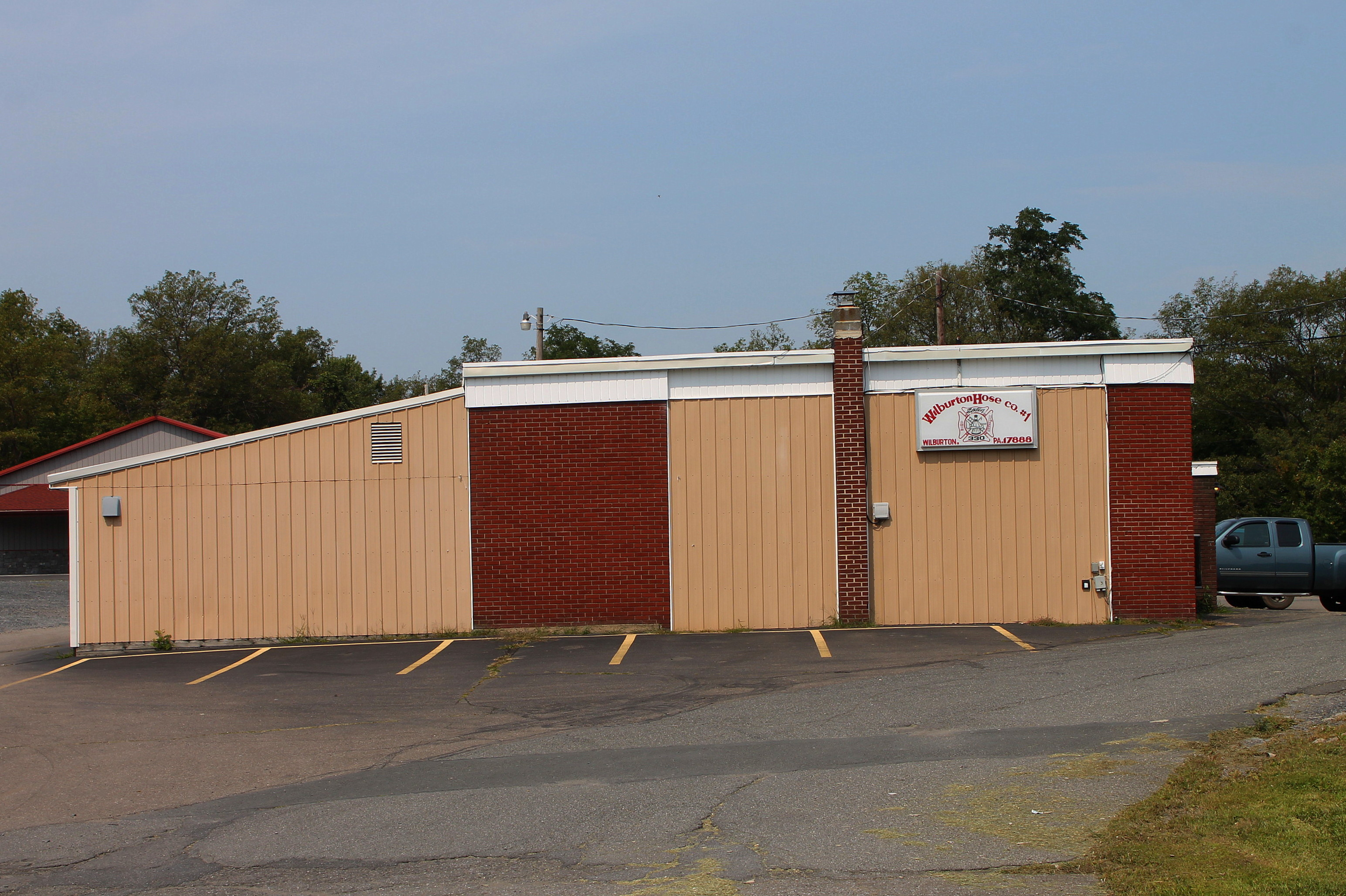
- Wilburton Number One fire company building

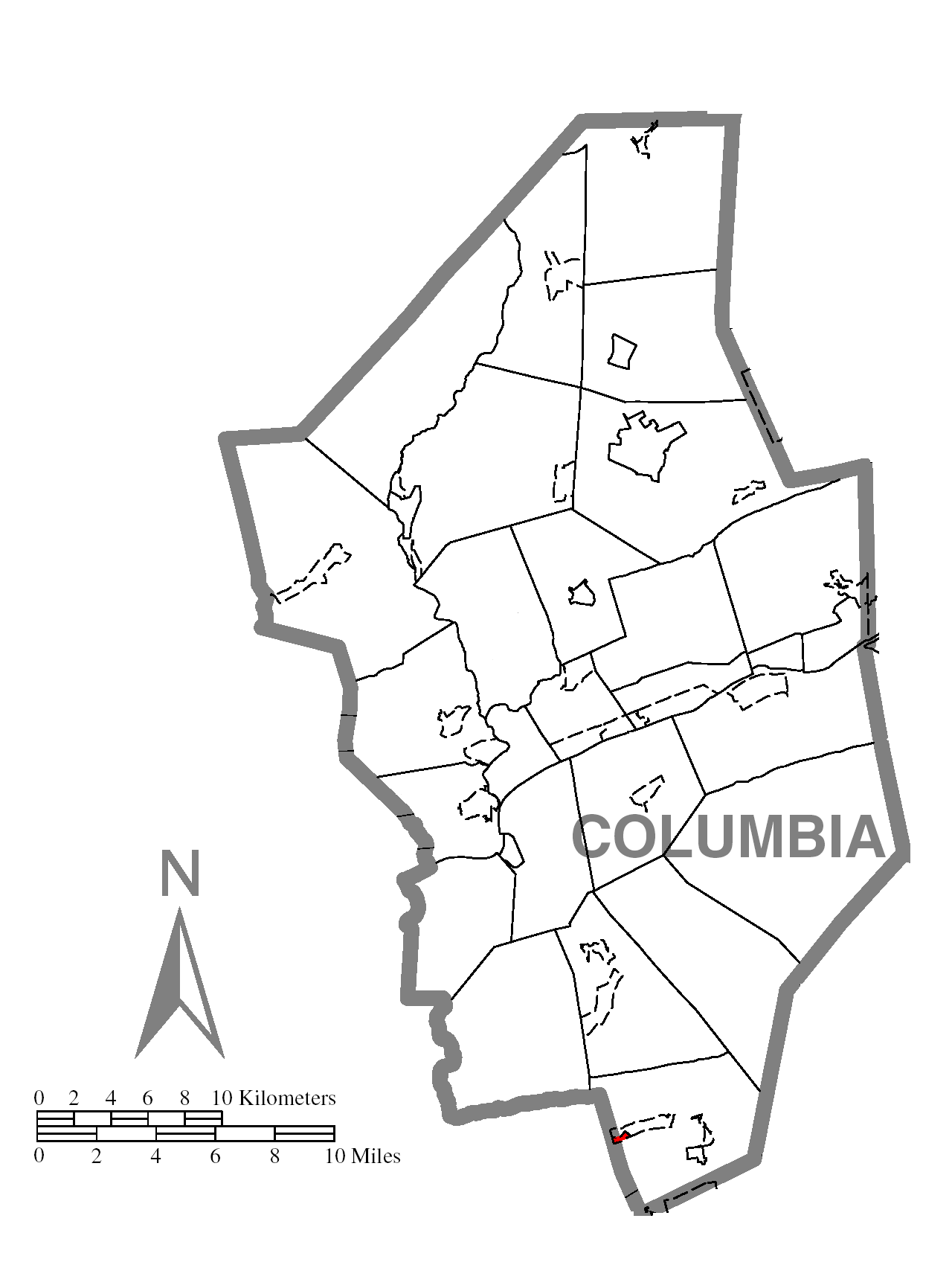
- Location within Columbia County

- Location within the U.S. state of Pennsylvania
- Coordinates: 40°48′48″N 76°23′26″W
- Country: United States
- State: Pennsylvania
- County: Columbia
- Township: Conyngham

Area
  - Total: 0.11 sq mi (0.28 km^{2})
  - Land: 0.11 sq mi (0.28 km^{2})
  - Water: 0 sq mi (0.0 km^{2})
- Elevation: 1,540 ft (470 m)

Population (2020)
  - Total: 223
  - Density: 1,845/sq mi (712.5/km^{2})
- Time zone: UTC-5 (Eastern (EST))
  - Summer (DST): UTC-4 (EDT)
- FIPS code: 42-85076
- GNIS feature ID: 1191389

Wilburton Number One is a census-designated place (CDP) in Columbia County, Pennsylvania, United States. It is part of Northeastern Pennsylvania. The population was 223 at the 2020 census. It is part of the Bloomsburg-Berwick micropolitan area.

== Geography ==
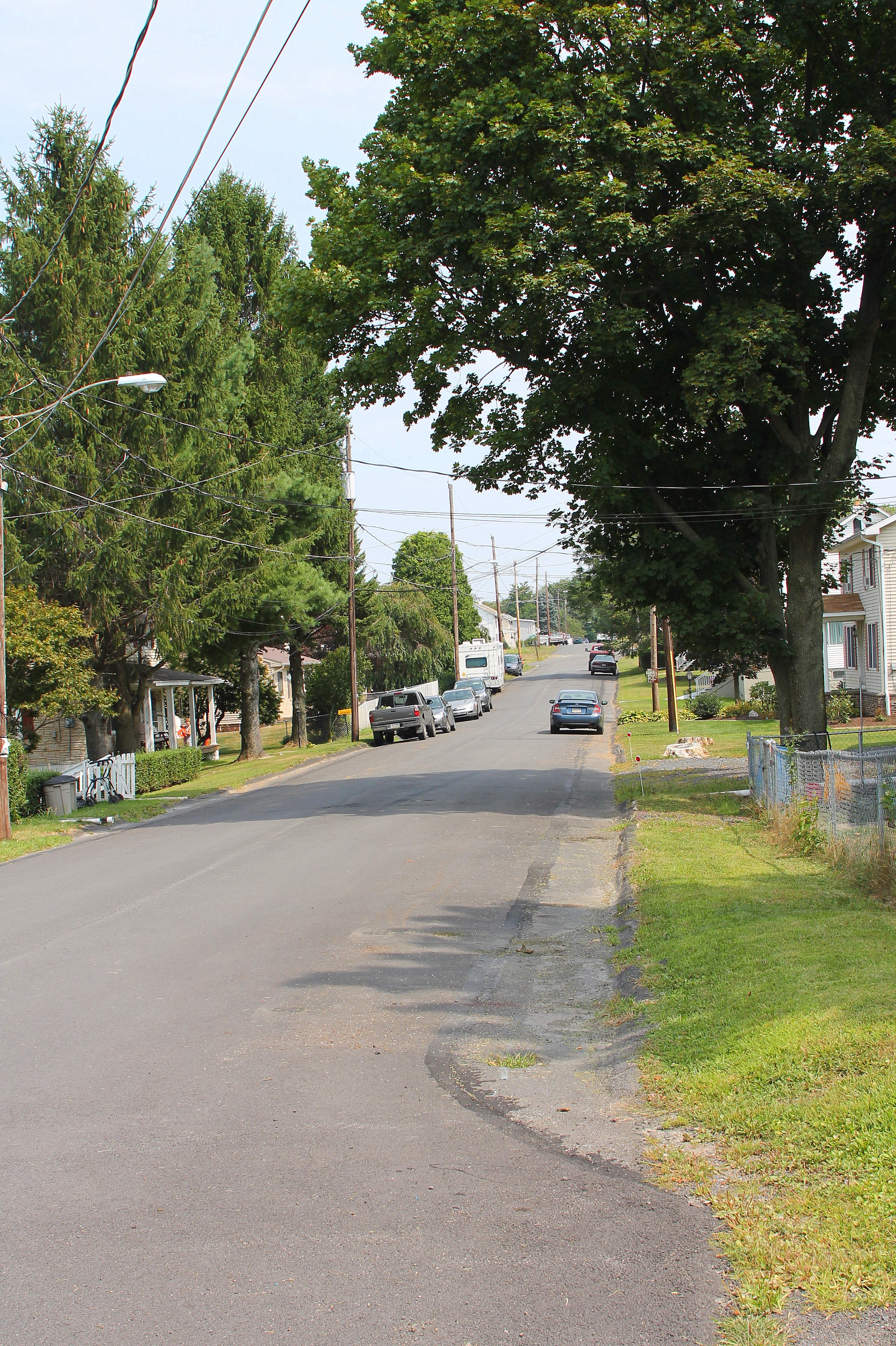
Street in Wilburton Number One, Pennsylvania

Wilburton Number One is located in southern Columbia County at 40°48′48″N 76°23′26″W (40.813200, -76.390439), on the western end of Conyngham Township. It is bordered to the west by Mount Carmel Township in Northumberland County, to the south by Midvalley Highway, and to the north and east by the Wilburton Number Two CDP. According to the United States Census Bureau, the Wilburton Number One CDP has a total area of 0.12 square miles (0.3 km^{2}), all land.

Wilburton Number One and Two are both served by the Wilburton Hose Co. #1. The firehouse is located in Wilburton Number One. Wilburton Number One's land is a mixture of forest and residential.

== Demographics ==
As of the census of 2000, there were 248 people, 103 households, and 77 families residing in the CDP. The population density was 2,389.3 inhabitants per square mile (922.5/km^{2}). There were 116 housing units at an average density of 1,117.6 per square mile (431.5/km^{2}). The racial makeup of the CDP was 99.60% White, and 0.40% from two or more races. Hispanic or Latino of any race were 2.02% of the population.

There were 103 households, out of which 25.2% had children under the age of 18 living with them, 63.1% were married couples living together, 7.8% had a female householder with no husband present, and 25.2% were non-families. 22.3% of all households were made up of individuals, and 12.6% had someone living alone who was 65 years of age or older. The average household size was 2.41 and the average family size was 2.81.

In the CDP, the population was spread out, with 21.0% under the age of 18, 5.2% from 18 to 24, 27.0% from 25 to 44, 27.0% from 45 to 64, and 19.8% who were 65 years of age or older. The median age was 43 years. For every 100 females, there were 90.8 males. For every 100 females age 18 and over, there were 94.1 males.

The median income for a household in the CDP was $36,250, and the median income for a family was $39,375. Males had a median income of $30,625 versus $15,938 for females. The per capita income for the CDP was $15,348. About 2.6% of families and 4.9% of the population were below the poverty line, including 4.3% of those under the age of eighteen and 6.1% of those sixty five or over.

== Education ==
The school district is the North Schuylkill School District.
