= Robert Spencer (doctor) =

American illegal abortionist (1889–1969)

Dr. Robert Douglas Spencer (1889–1969) was a general practitioner in Ashland, Pennsylvania, best known for his work as an illegal abortion provider in the decades before Roe v. Wade. He operated his practice from the 1920s until his death and is believed to have performed some 40,000 abortions. He was a graduate of the University of Pennsylvania Medical School, graduating in 1915. He served in the U.S. Army and worked for a few years as a chief pathologist in a miners' hospital. He was known for embracing cutting-edge treatments for black lung disease and became one of the first doctors in the country to use sodium pentathol, radium pellets, and a bronchoscope.

Spencer reportedly performed his first abortion in 1919, 1923 or 1925, for the wife of a coal miner. Word spread through social networks that Spencer was willing to perform abortions, and women seeking abortions traveled from around the country to Ashland. Spencer originally charged $5 for an abortion and, though the expense went up over the decades, he reportedly never charged more than $100.

The local residents were aware of his illegal practice but either tolerated or welcomed it. "The hotel, the restaurant, the dress shop all thrived on the extra business that came from his out-of-town patients. He built facilities at his clinic for Negro patients who weren't allowed to obtain overnight lodgings elsewhere in Ashland."

Spencer was arrested three times but was never convicted. His first arrests led to acquittals, and he died before the third case went to trial.

Spencer reportedly considered performing abortions to be a public service, both on behalf of the women seeking them and as a means of curbing the population.

A documentary, Dear Dr. Spencer, features a selection of letters written to Dr. Spencer by women seeking his services. It also features interviews with Spencer's widow, attorney, and friends, as well as with women he'd performed abortions on and a juror who had voted to acquit him at one of his trials though she was opposed to abortion.

== Spencer's abortion practice ==
=== Technique ===
Spencer first used a method that involved packing the uterus so that it would expel the fetus along with the foreign material.

One day he received an advertisement for Leunbach's Paste, consisting of "potassium hydroxide, sodium hydroxide, iodine and potassium iodide in an olive oil and cacao butter base" and inserted into the uterus with a syringe. When the paste was taken off the market as dangerous, Spencer "began manufacturing his own product in his laboratory, a mild soft-soap solution, which he used to dilate the cervix and loosen the concepts in the first stage of his procedure. The following day he would complete the curettage. Spencer refined his own technique and he stuck with it for 40 years. The newer methods didn't interest him."

=== A patient's experience ===
Activist Polly Rothstein described assisting a pregnant friend, who she identified as "X", in 1958. X asked around among friends and acquaintances for an abortion referral. One person recommended Spencer and said that X should report her presenting symptom as "vaginal discharge". Spencer "told us the procedure would take two days, what motel to call, and where to park."

Rothstein described Spencer's office as "unforgettably weird—walls and ceilings brimming with plaques from souvenir shops." She and X sat in the waiting room with Spencer's other patients until he summoned them into the exam room. She described Spencer as "white-haired and kindly."

According to Rothstein, Spencer inserted something to dilate X's cervix and instructed the women to return in the morning. The next morning, Rothstein was left in a room while X went with Spencer to another room for her abortion. "Eventually," Rothstein wrote, "Dr. Spencer returned with X over his shoulder in a fireman's carry, out cold. He gently unloaded her onto the cot; her eyes were rolled back so only the whites showed. After she came to and had rested, he checked her, gave her post-op instructions and antibiotics, and wished her well. The entire charge, including anesthesia, was $50."

=== Spencer's records ===
Spencer's records were burned by his second wife, preventing researchers from accurately documenting his practice. Thus, neither his technique nor the number and type of patients treated can be verified.

== The Mary Davies case ==
One of Spencer's arrests stemmed from the death of 26-year-old Mary Davies, who had traveled from New York City on Saturday, December 8, 1956, seeking an abortion. According to Spencer, Mary came to him alone. She reported that she'd been bleeding for about two weeks. Spencer did not examine her at the initial visit, but gave her medication for pain and bleeding. He instructed her to return the next day for the abortion.

Mary returned the next morning at about 10 a.m. Spencer administered 13 cm^{3} of Evipal in a 10% solution to induce anesthesia. He testified, "I injected that solution into the vein of the left arm and in ten seconds she was asleep." The next thing he noticed, he said, was that Mary had stopped breathing and had turned blue. He injected her with a cardio-respiratory stimulant into her left leg, but she didn't respond. He administered a second injection into a vein.

When these efforts failed, Spencer called his assistant, Mildred Zettlemoyer, into the room to assist in his attempts to resuscitate Mary with oxygen. Leaving Mary in Zettlemoyer's care, Spencer left the room to retrieve adrenaline. He gave Mary three injections of adrenaline.

When this effort to revive his patient failed, Spencer had Zettlemoyer call Steve Sekunda, his laboratory assistant. Spencer inserted a breathing tube but had to work blind because the light on his endoscope wasn't working. He resumed artificial respiration. By the time Sekunda arrived, at around 11:30, Spencer had concluded that Mary was dead. Spencer concluded "that this patient died in my office from some heart disease."

Dr. Milton Helpern, chief medical examiner for New York City, was among the experts that testified in Spencer's trial for Mary's death. Helpern concluded that Mary had been pregnant, that the pregnancy had been terminated shortly before her death, and that she had died from administration of a drug used for anesthesia. Mary had been in good health before her death. No mention is made of any fetal remains being found in Mary's body or in Spencer's office.

Patricia G. Miller, author of The Worst of Times, asked another doctor, "Dr. Bert," who had practiced before legalization, to review news reports of Mary's death and speculate as to whether Mary would have died had abortion been legal. "Dr. Bert" faulted Spencer for not having an assistant while he was administering general anesthesia and speculated that Spencer had not had an assistant with him due to the law against abortion.

Spencer's widow, Eleanor, told Miller that her husband had been quite stricken by Mary Davies' death. He continued to perform abortions, however, along with his regular medical practice, up until the trial. He was acquitted on all counts, likely because it was impossible to prove that Mary had neither miscarried during those two weeks of bleeding before her appointment with Spencer nor been aborted by somebody else.

== After the trial ==
Spencer briefly ceased doing abortions after the trial, "for a month or so," his widow said. But he resumed his business and eventually got entangled with Harry Mace, who ran a referral business bringing women to Spencer for abortions. Eleanor Spencer lamented that Mace flooded her husband with patients, pressuring him to rush through abortions. Spencer's health began to fail. He was arrested again, due to the attention from Mace's activities, but died before the case went to trial.
