= Gordon, Pennsylvania =

Borough in Pennsylvania, US

- Borough
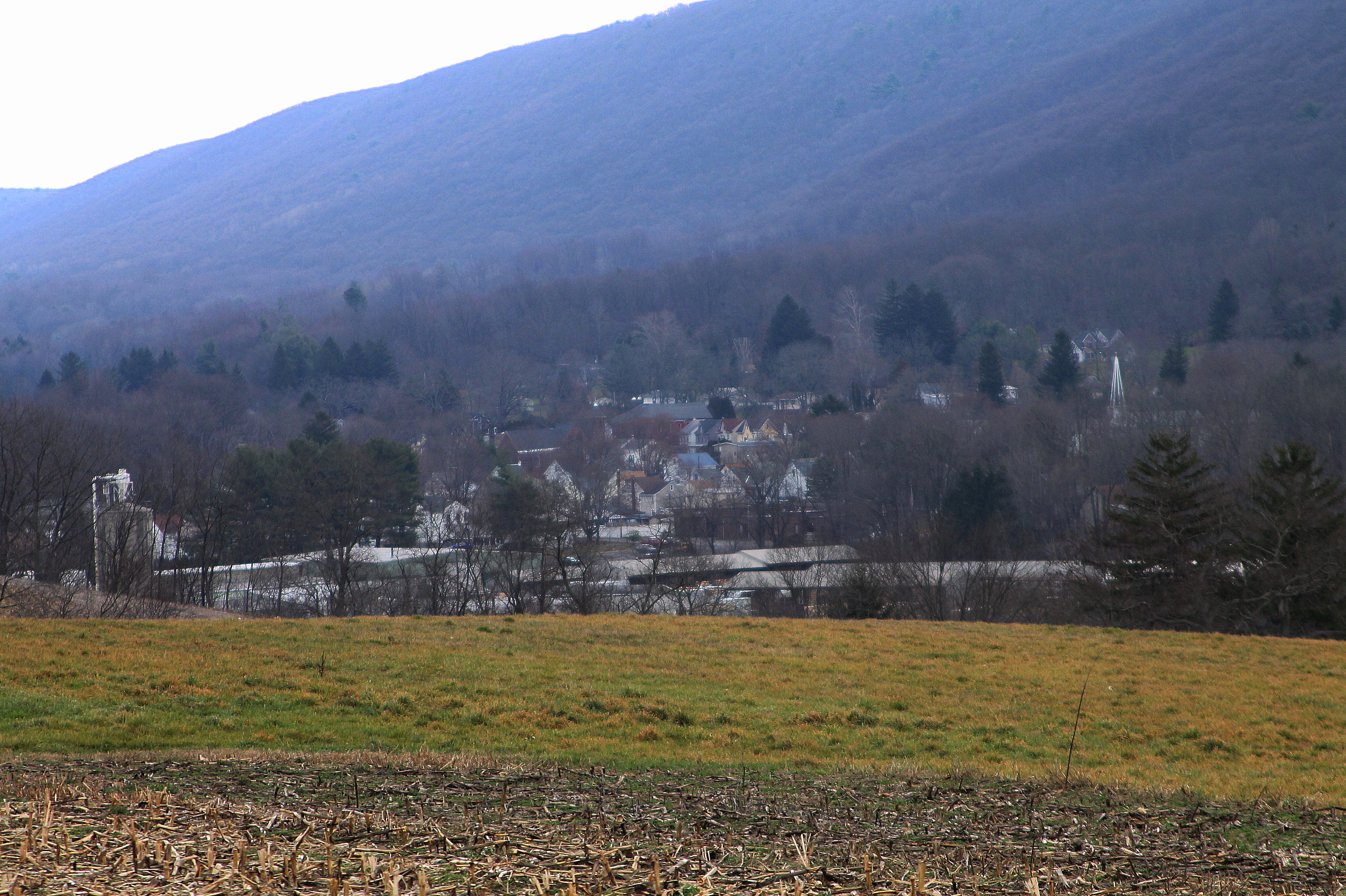
- View of Gordon, Pennsylvania

- Location of Gordon in Schuylkill County, Pennsylvania.

- Location in Pennsylvania Gordon (the United States)
- Coordinates: 40°45′03″N 76°20′22″W
- Country: United States
- State: Pennsylvania
- County: Schuylkill
- Settled: 1856
- Incorporated: 1891

Government
  - Type: Borough Council
  - Mayor: George Brocious

Area
  - Total: 0.59 sq mi (1.54 km^{2})
  - Land: 0.59 sq mi (1.54 km^{2})
  - Water: 0 sq mi (0.00 km^{2})

Population (2020)
  - Total: 761
  - Density: 1,283.4/sq mi (495.51/km^{2})
- Time zone: UTC-5 (Eastern (EST))
  - Summer (DST): UTC-4 (EDT)
- Zip code: 17936
- Area code: 570
- FIPS code: 42-30128
- Website: https://gordonborough.com/

Gordon is a borough in Schuylkill County, Pennsylvania, United States. The population was 765 at the 2020 census.

== Geography ==
Gordon is located at 40°45′3″N 76°20′22″W (40.750943, -76.339447).

According to the United States Census Bureau, the borough has a total area of 0.6 square miles (1.6 km^{2}), all land.

Gordon is located north of Interstate 81.

== History ==
The community is named after David F. Gordon, a judge. The post office at Gordon was established July 15, 1858, with J. Faust as the first postmaster.

== Demographics ==
Historical population
Census	Pop.	Note	%±
1880	753		—
1890	1,194		58.6%
1900	1,165		−2.4%
1910	1,185		1.7%
1920	1,078		−9.0%
1930	1,069		−0.8%
1940	1,062		−0.7%
1950	1,039		−2.2%
1960	888		−14.5%
1970	856		−3.6%
1980	892		4.2%
1990	768		−13.9%
2000	781		1.7%
2010	763		−2.3%
2020	761		−0.3%
2021 (est.)	766	▲	0.7%

At the 2000 census there were 781 people, 312 households, and 210 families living in the borough. The population density was 1,230.7 inhabitants per square mile (475.2/km^{2}). There were 340 housing units at an average density of 535.8 per square mile (206.9/km^{2}). The racial makeup of the borough was 98.72% White, 0.38% Native American, 0.26% Asian, 0.26% from other races, and 0.38% from two or more races. Hispanic or Latino of any race were 0.51%.

Of the 312 households 33.7% had children under the age of 18 living with them, 51.9% were married couples living together, 12.5% had a female householder with no husband present, and 32.4% were non-families. 30.4% of households were one person and 18.3% were one person aged 65 or older. The average household size was 2.50 and the average family size was 3.12.

The age distribution was 25.5% under the age of 18, 9.6% from 18 to 24, 26.9% from 25 to 44, 23.6% from 45 to 64, and 14.5% 65 or older. The median age was 38 years. For every 100 females there were 96.2 males. For every 100 females age 18 and over, there were 96.0 males.

The median household income was $30,855 and the median family income was $40,714. Males had a median income of $28,125 versus $21,354 for females. The per capita income for the borough was $13,873. About 9.8% of families and 11.3% of the population were below the poverty line, including 12.2% of those under age 18 and 11.1% of those age 65 or over.

== Education ==
The school district is North Schuylkill School District.

== Gallery ==
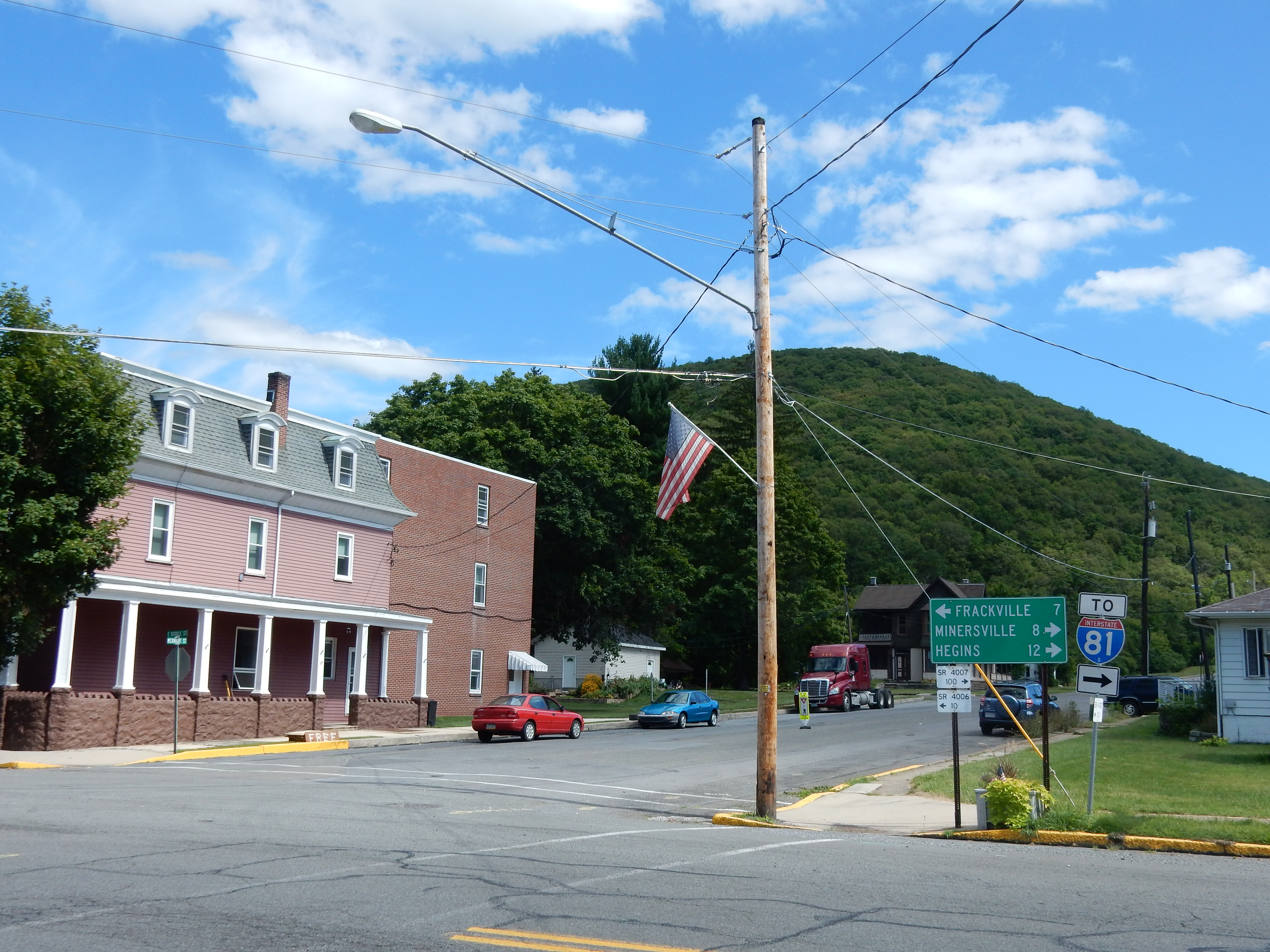
Gordon

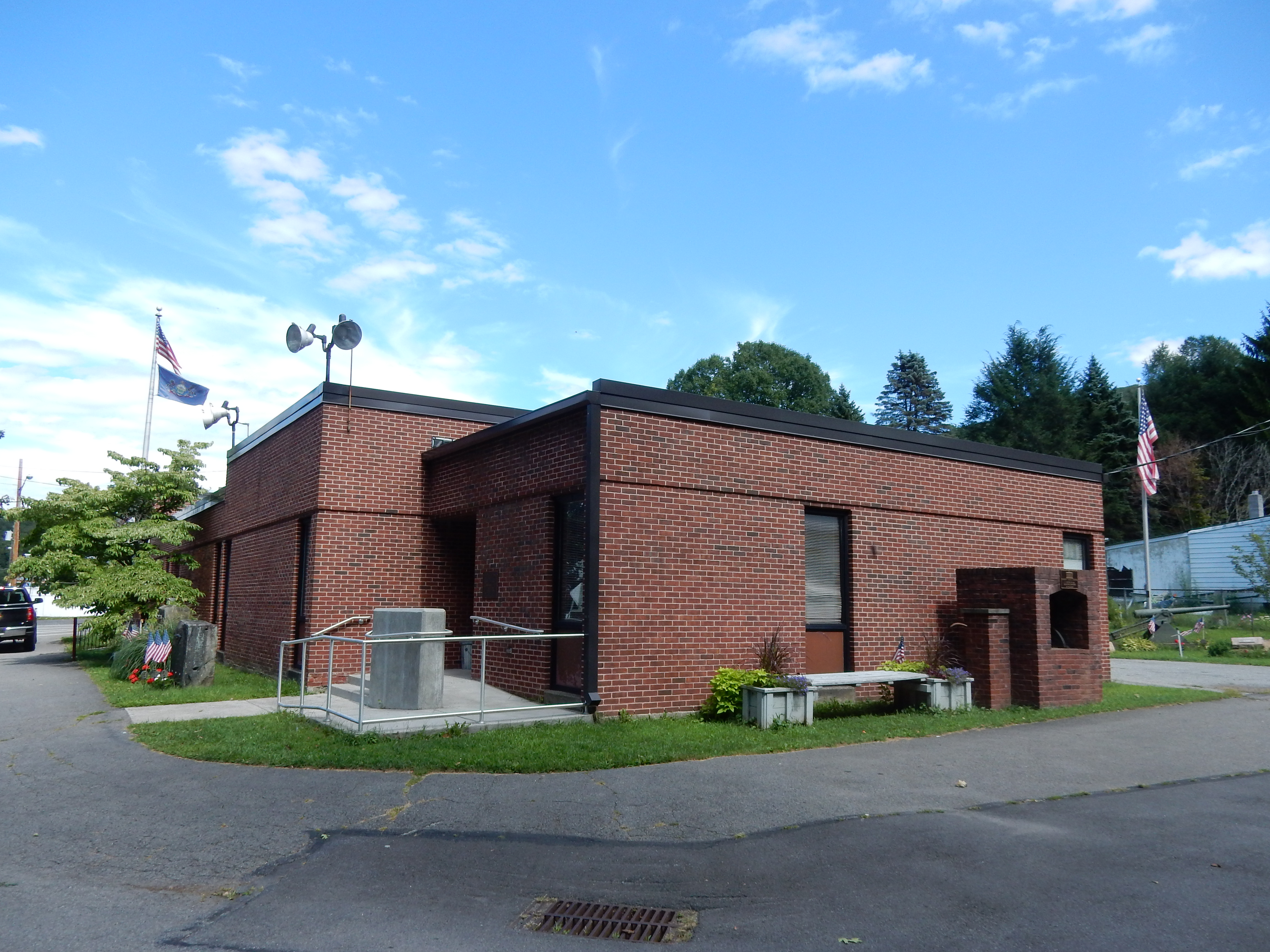
Gordon Municipal Building

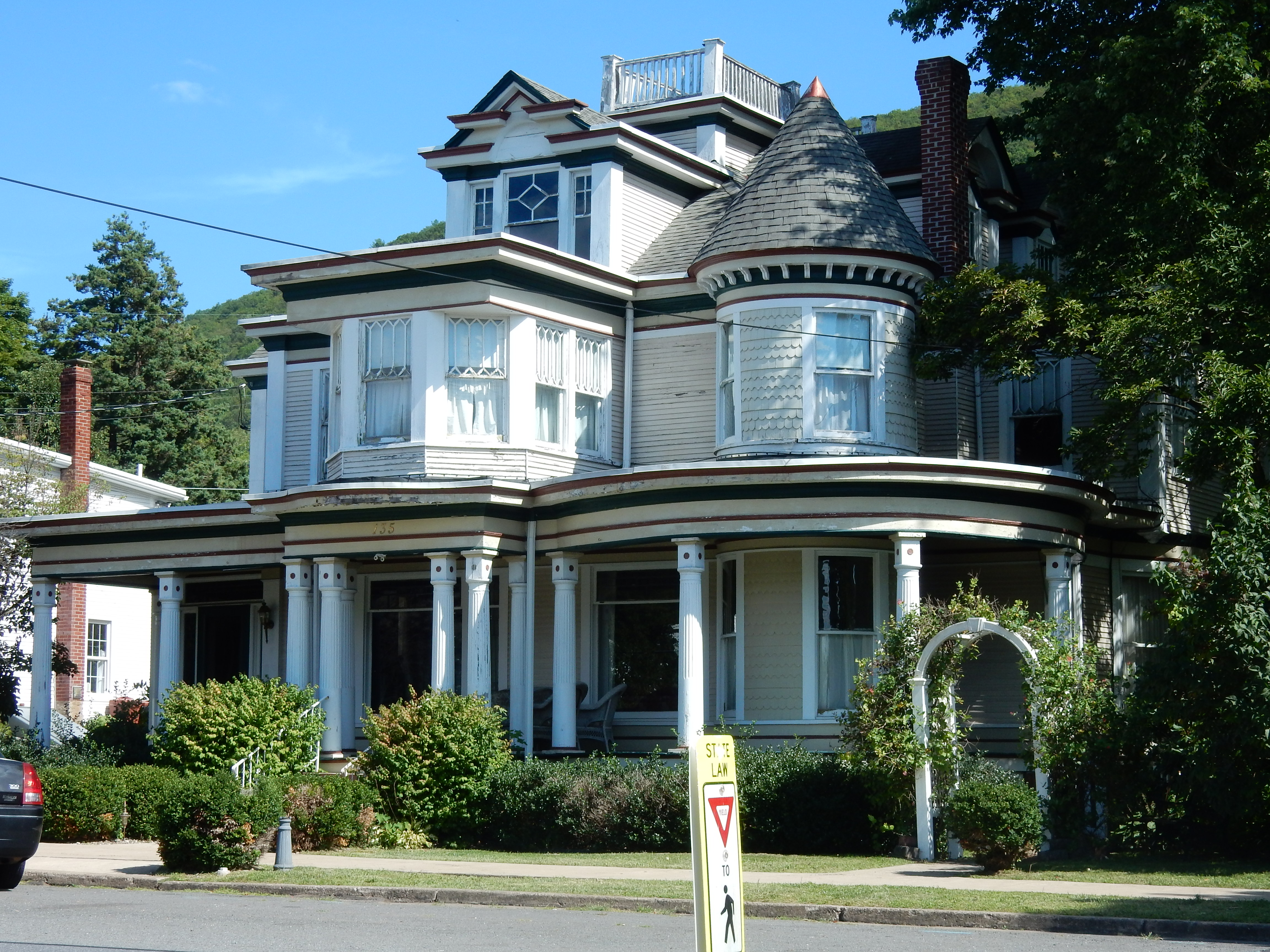
Residence on Biddle Street

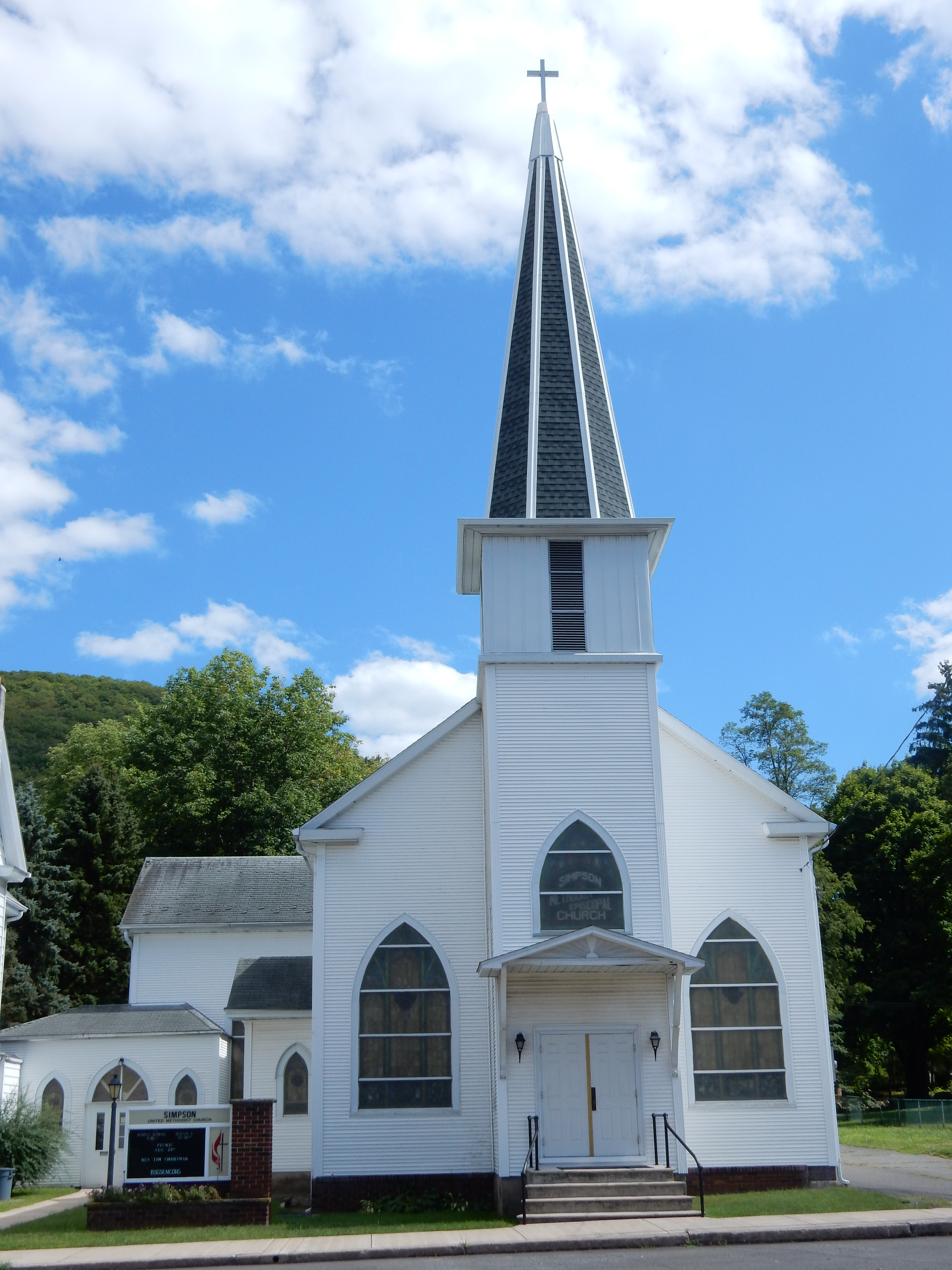
Simpson UMC

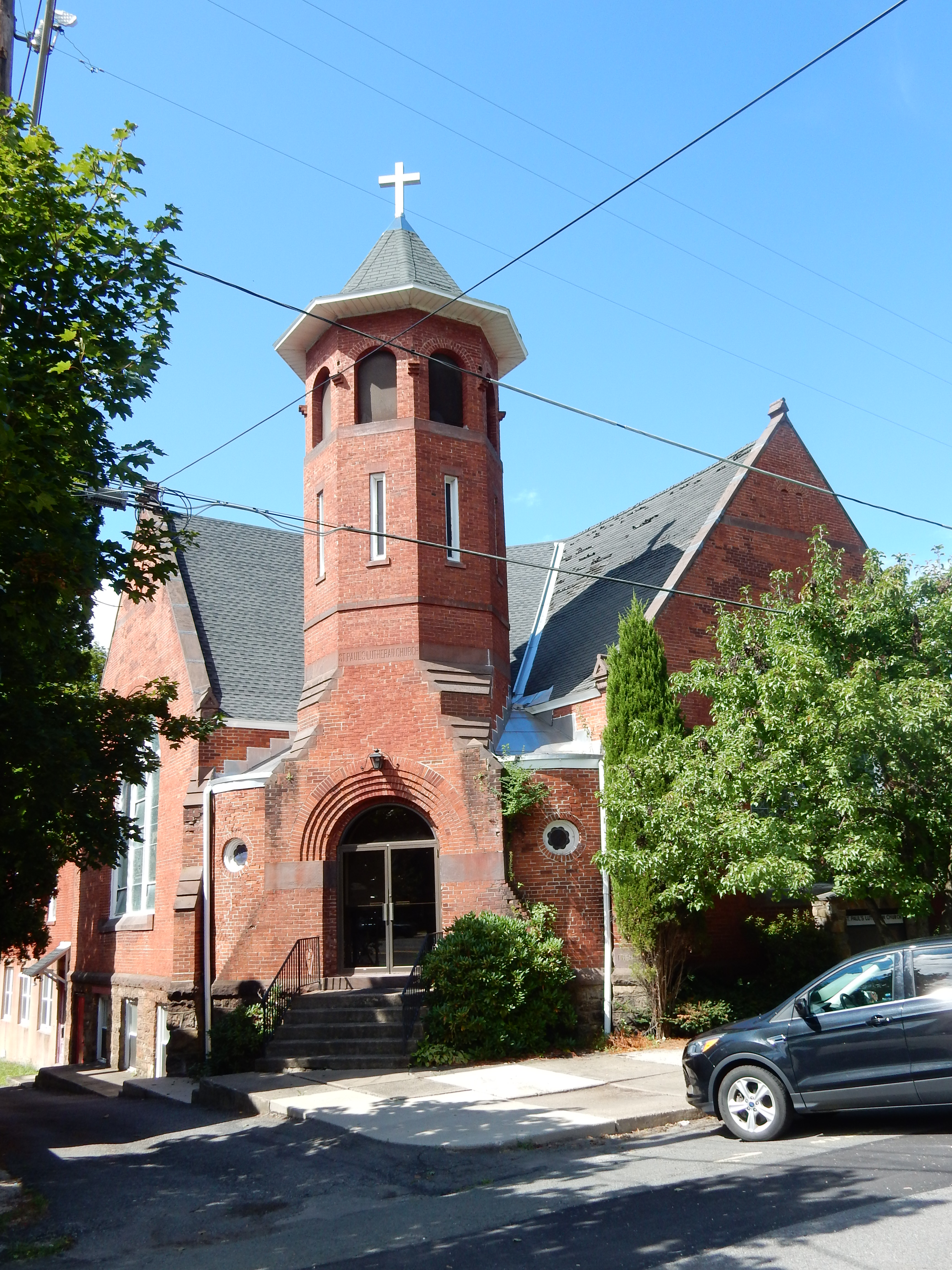
St. Paul's Lutheran Church
