= Conyngham Township, Columbia County, Pennsylvania =

Township in Pennsylvania, US

Coordinates: 40°50′00″N 76°22′35″W

- Township
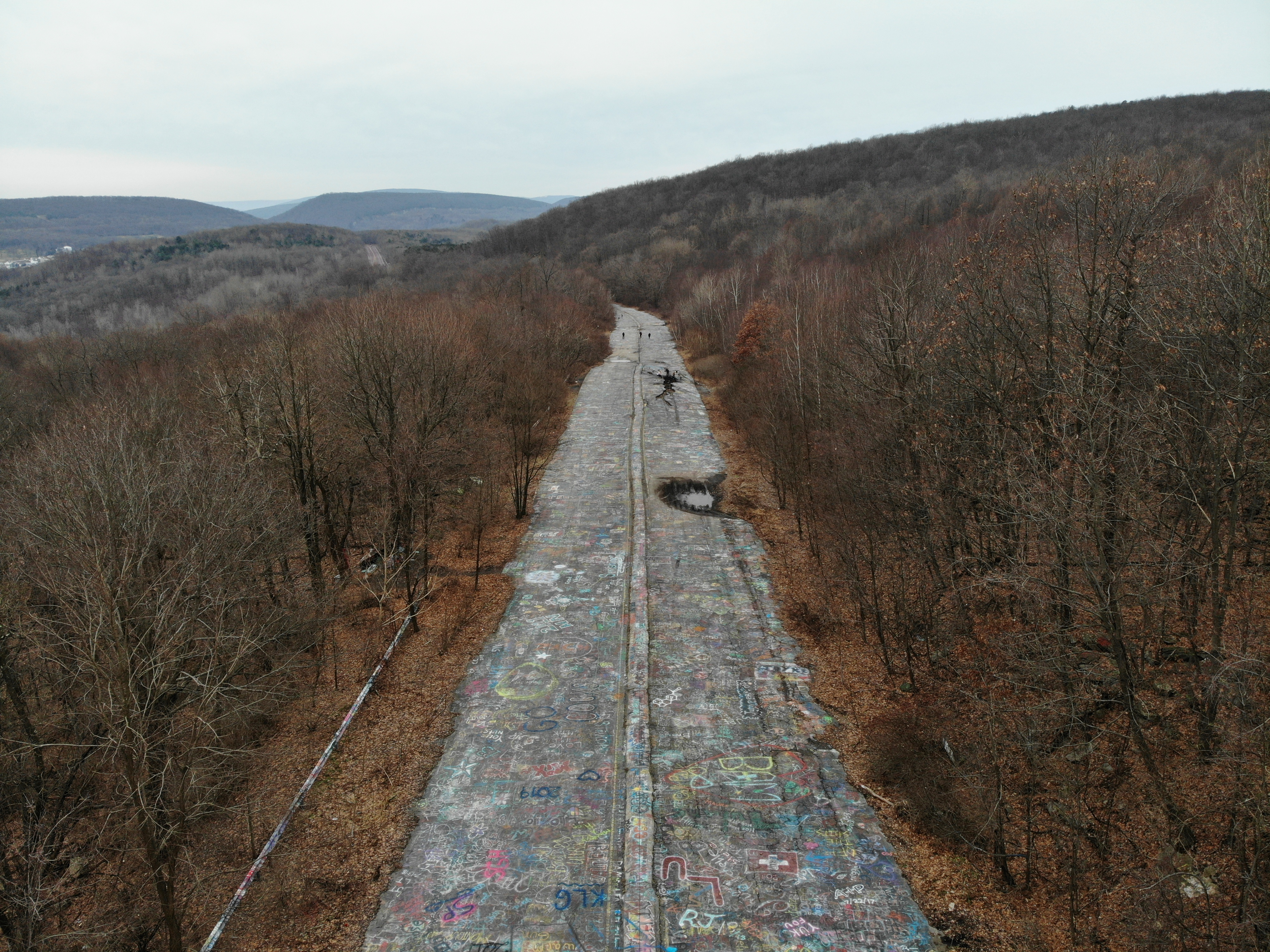
- Abandoned portion of PA 61 in Conyngham Township from 2019 (since removed)

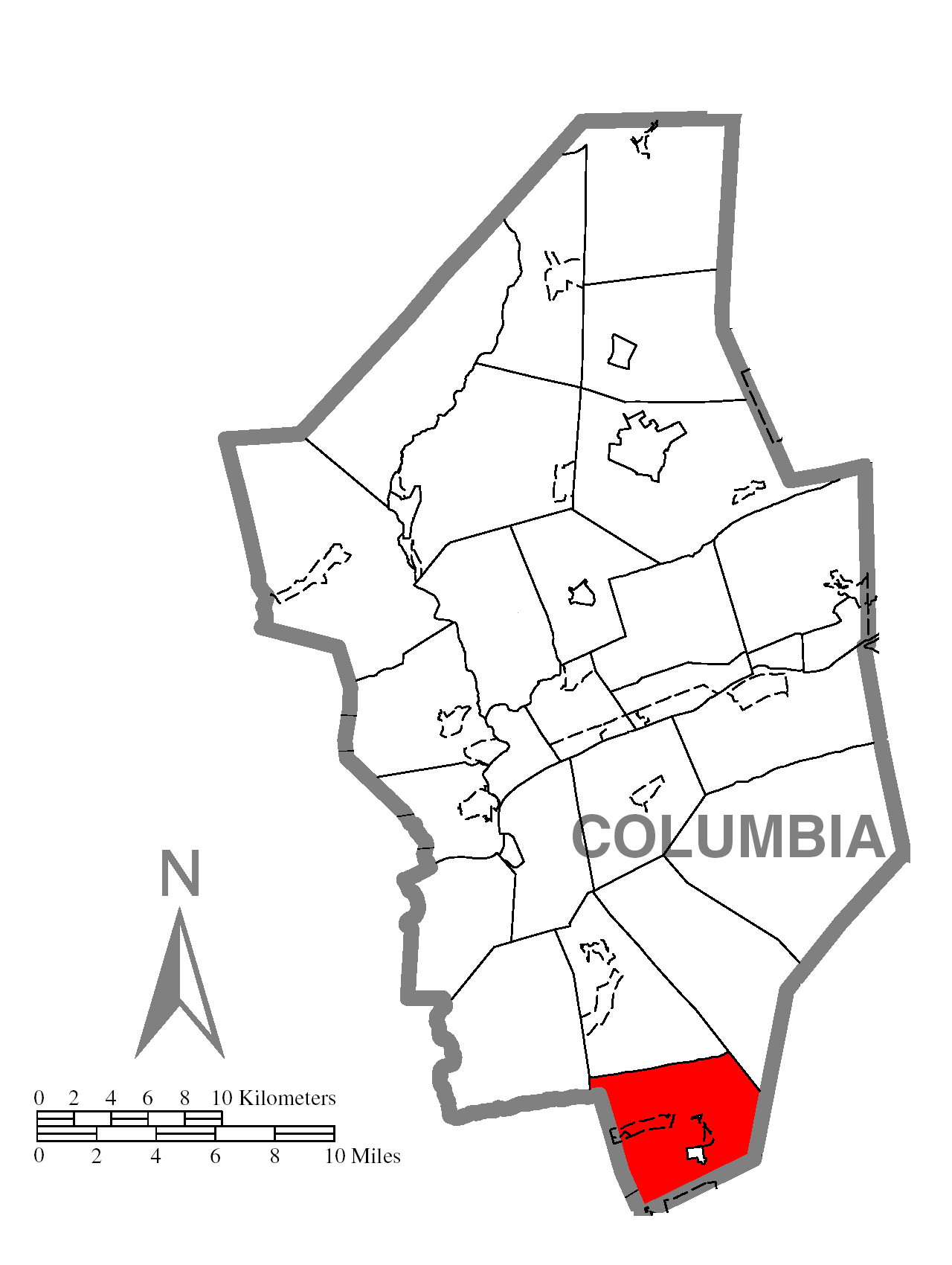
- Map of Columbia County, Pennsylvania highlighting Conyngham Township

- Map of Columbia County, Pennsylvania
- Country: United States
- State: Pennsylvania
- County: Columbia
- Settled: 1830
- Incorporated: 1856

Area
  - Total: 20.72 sq mi (53.66 km^{2})
  - Land: 20.46 sq mi (53.00 km^{2})
  - Water: 0.26 sq mi (0.67 km^{2})

Population (2020)
  - Total: 689
  - Density: 34/sq mi (13/km^{2})
- Time zone: UTC-5 (Eastern (EST))
  - Summer (DST): UTC-4 (EDT)
- Area code: 570
- FIPS code: 42-037-15880
- Website: https://conynghamtownship.wordpress.com/

Conyngham Township is a township in Columbia County, Pennsylvania, United States. It is part of Northeastern Pennsylvania. The population was 689 at the 2020 census. Conyngham Township surrounds the famous borough of Centralia, and part of the mine fire is located here. The abandoned town of Byrnesville is located here.

== Geography ==
Conyngham is the southernmost township in Columbia County, bordered by Northumberland County to the west and by Schuylkill County to the south and southeast. The northern boundary of the township follows the ridgecrest of Little Mountain, with a high point of 1,820 feet (550 m) above sea level. Big Mountain, also with a high point of 1820 feet, crosses the center of the township from east to west. The unincorporated community of Aristes is near the center of the township, near the summit of Big Mountain, Locustdale is in the township's southwest, and the communities of Wilburton Number One and Wilburton Number Two are to the west. The borough of Centralia is surrounded by the southern part of the township. The borough of Ashland in Schuylkill County is along the township's southern border, directly south of Centralia.

According to the United States Census Bureau, the township has a total area of 20.7 square miles (53.7 km^{2}), of which 20.5 square miles (53.0 km^{2}) is land and 0.3 square miles (0.7 km^{2}), or 1.24%, is water.

== Demographics ==
Historical population
Census	Pop.	Note	%±
2010	758		—
2020	689		−9.1%
U.S. Decennial Census

As of the census of 2000, there were 792 people, 337 households, and 234 families residing in the township. The population density was 39.3 inhabitants per square mile (15.2/km^{2}). There were 377 housing units at an average density of 18.7/sq mi (7.2/km^{2}). The racial makeup of the township was 99.62% White, 0.13% from other races, and 0.25% from two or more races. Hispanic or Latino of any race were 0.76% of the population.

There were 337 households, out of which 26.4% had children under the age of 18 living with them, 57.0% were married couples living together, 8.6% had a female householder with no husband present, and 30.3% were non-families. 27.6% of all households were made up of individuals, and 16.6% had someone living alone who was 65 years of age or older. The average household size was 2.35 and the average family size was 2.84.

In the township the population was spread out, with 20.8% under the age of 18, 5.9% from 18 to 24, 27.4% from 25 to 44, 25.8% from 45 to 64, and 20.1% who were 65 years of age or older. The median age was 43 years. For every 100 females, there were 90.8 males. For every 100 females age 18 and over, there were 89.4 males.

The median income for a household in the township was $27,292, and the median income for a family was $35,391. Males had a median income of $29,423 versus $15,769 for females. The per capita income for the township was $14,230. About 8.9% of families and 11.0% of the population were below the poverty line, including 20.4% of those under age 18 and 7.2% of those age 65 or over.
