= Butler Township, Schuylkill County, Pennsylvania =

Township in Pennsylvania, US

Coordinates: 40°46′00″N 76°22′30″W

- Township
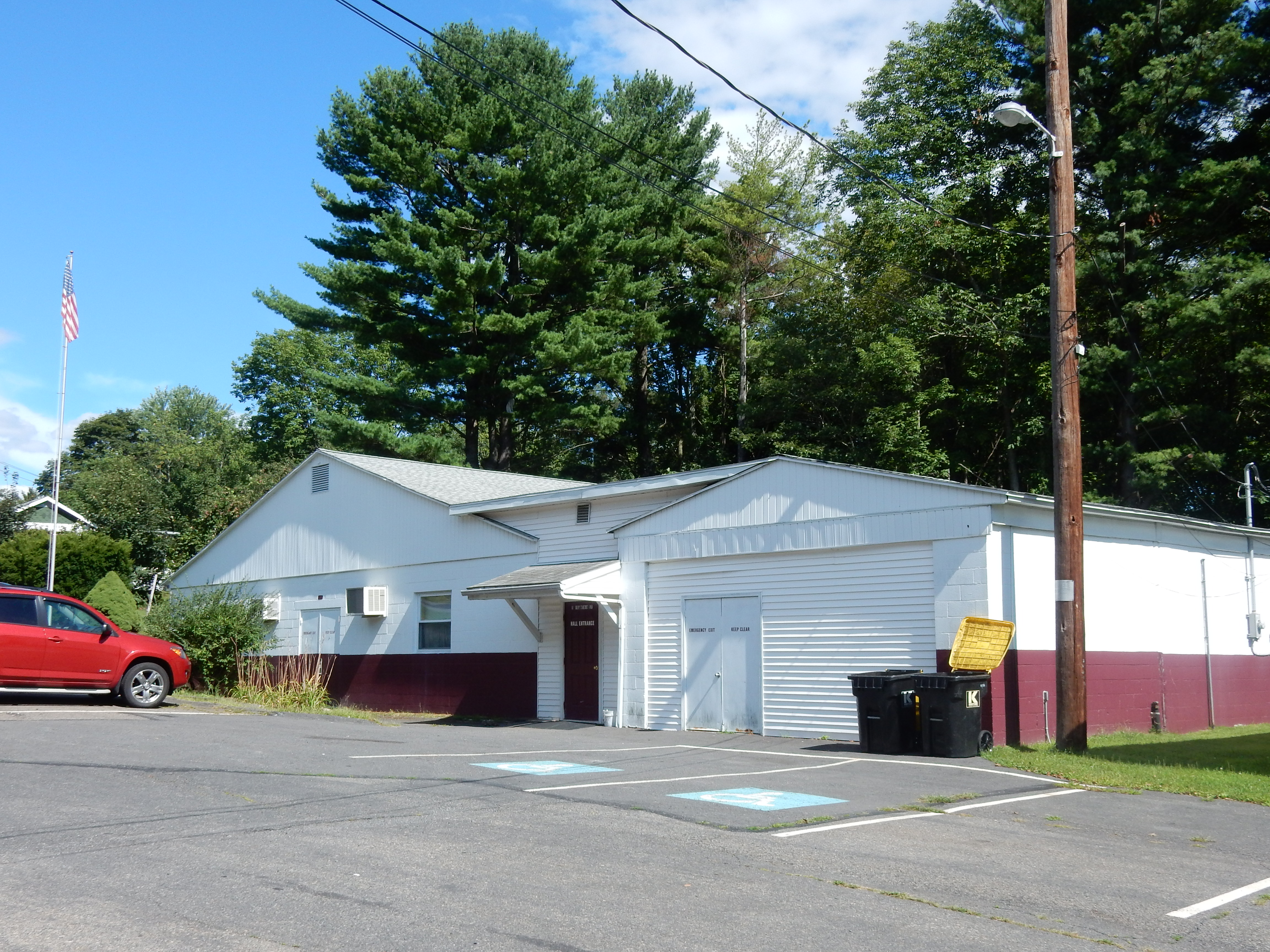
- Township Hall in Butler Township

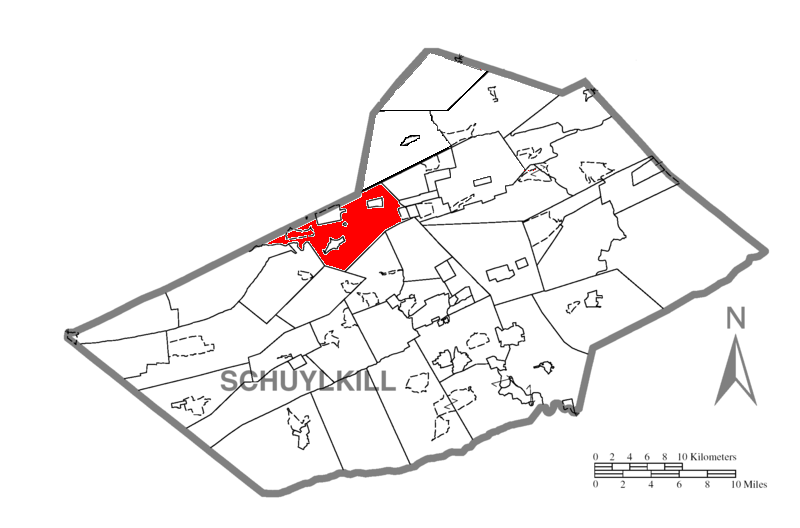
- Location of Butler Township in Schuylkill County, Pennsylvania

- Location of Schuylkill County in Pennsylvania
- Country: United States
- State: Pennsylvania
- County: Schuylkill
- Settled: 1801
- Incorporated: 1848

Area
  - Total: 26.07 sq mi (67.52 km^{2})
  - Land: 26.03 sq mi (67.43 km^{2})
  - Water: 0.035 sq mi (0.09 km^{2})

Population (2020)
  - Total: 4,908 ▼
  - Estimate (2023): 4,998
  - Density: 181.9/sq mi (70.23/km^{2})
- Time zone: UTC-5 (Eastern (EST))
  - Summer (DST): UTC-4 (EDT)
- FIPS code: 42-107-10488

Butler Township is a township in Schuylkill County, Pennsylvania, United States. Formed in 1848 from part of Barry Township, it is named for war hero William Orlando Butler.

== Geography ==
According to the U.S. Census Bureau, the township has a total area of 26.1 square miles (68 km^{2}), 26.1 square miles (68 km^{2}) of which is land and 0.04 square miles (0.10 km^{2}) (0.11%) of which is water. It contains the census-designated places of Englewood, Fountain Springs, Lavelle, and part of Locustdale.

== Demographics ==
Historical population
Census	Pop.	Note	%±
2010	5,224		—
2020	4,908		−6.0%
2023 (est.)	4,998		1.8%
U.S. Decennial Census

As of the census of 2000, there were 3,588 people, 1,416 households, and 1,035 families living in the township. The population density was 137.4 inhabitants per square mile (53.1/km^{2}). There were 1,540 housing units at an average density of 59.0 per square mile (22.8/km^{2}). The racial makeup of the township was 98.91% White, 0.59% African American, 0.03% Native American, 0.22% Asian, 0.11% from other races, and 0.14% from two or more races. Hispanic or Latino of any race were 0.11% of the population.

There were 1,416 households, out of which 25.1% had children under the age of 18 living with them, 60.8% were married couples living together, 7.7% had a female householder with no husband present, and 26.9% were non-families. 23.9% of all households were made up of individuals, and 13.1% had someone living alone who was 65 years of age or older. The average household size was 2.44 and the average family size was 2.88.

In the township the population was spread out, with 18.7% under the age of 18, 6.9% from 18 to 24, 26.0% from 25 to 44, 28.5% from 45 to 64, and 19.9% who were 65 years of age or older. The median age was 44 years. For every 100 females, there were 96.3 males. For every 100 females age 18 and over, there were 93.8 males.

The median income for a household in the township was $39,375, and the median income for a family was $48,886. Males had a median income of $34,259 versus $21,806 for females. The per capita income for the township was $19,723. About 2.6% of families and 5.2% of the population were below the poverty line, including 5.5% of those under age 18 and 4.6% of those age 65 or over.

== Gallery ==
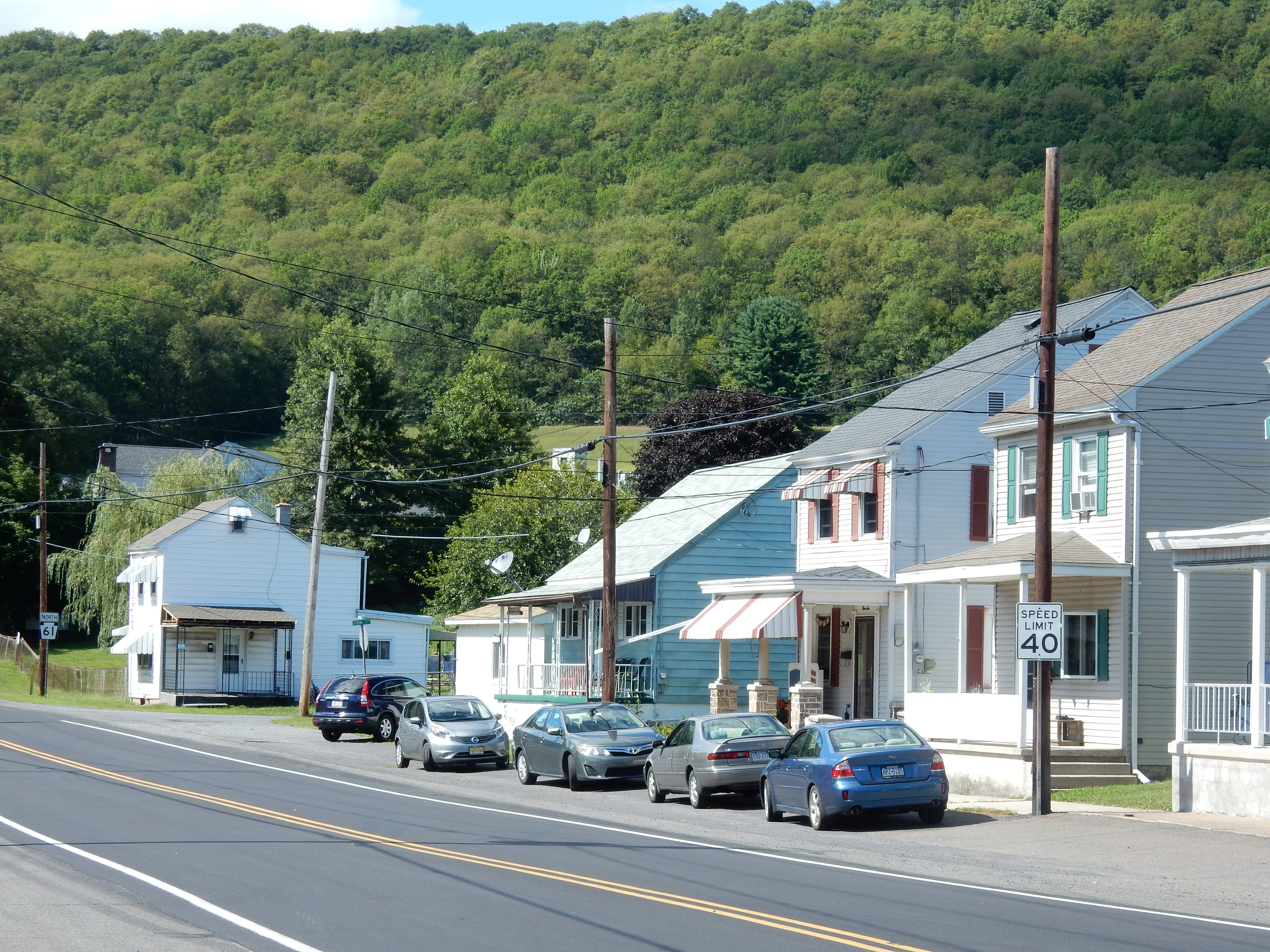
Broad Street in Fountain Springs.

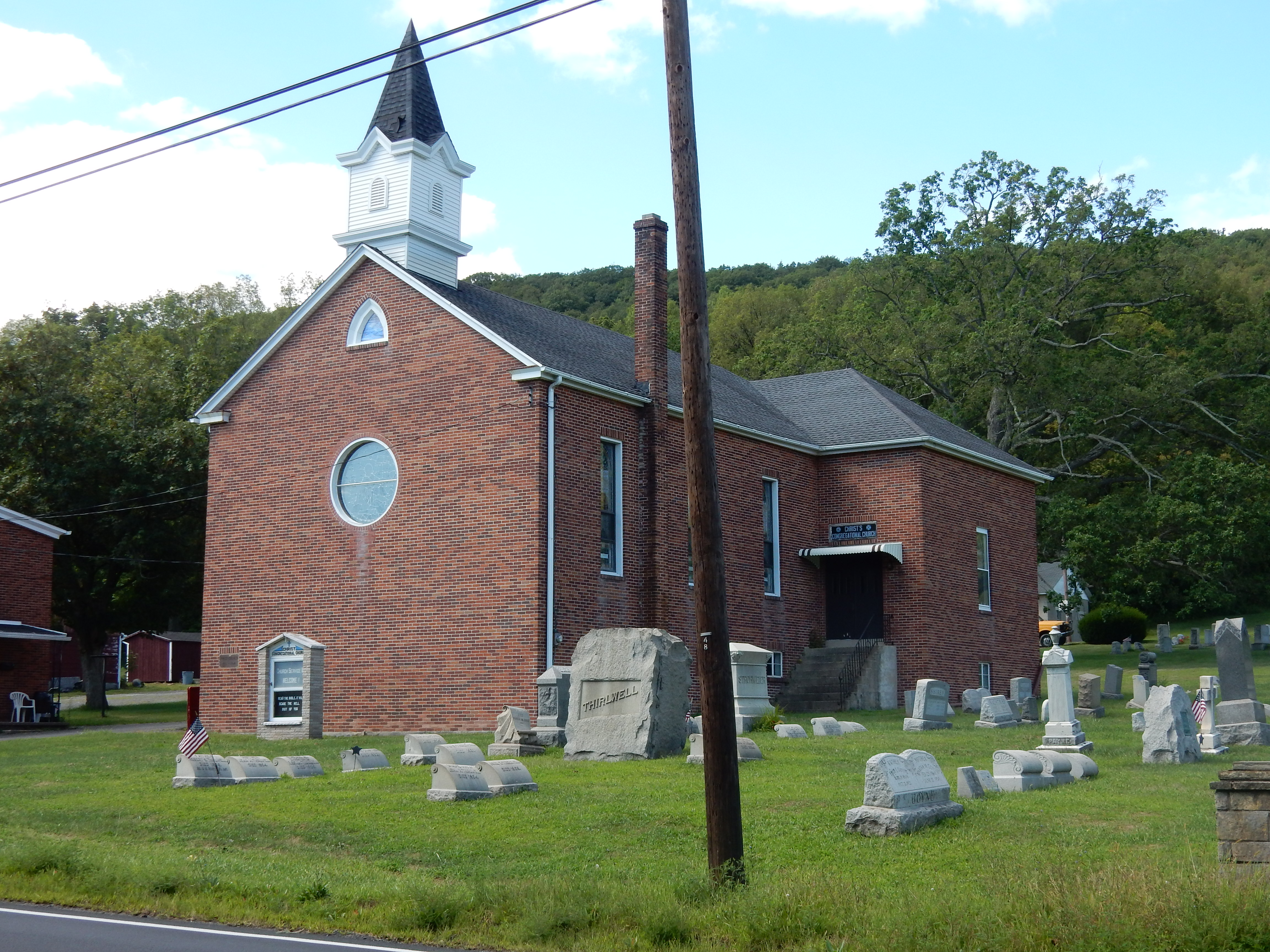
Christ Congregational Church in Fountain Springs.

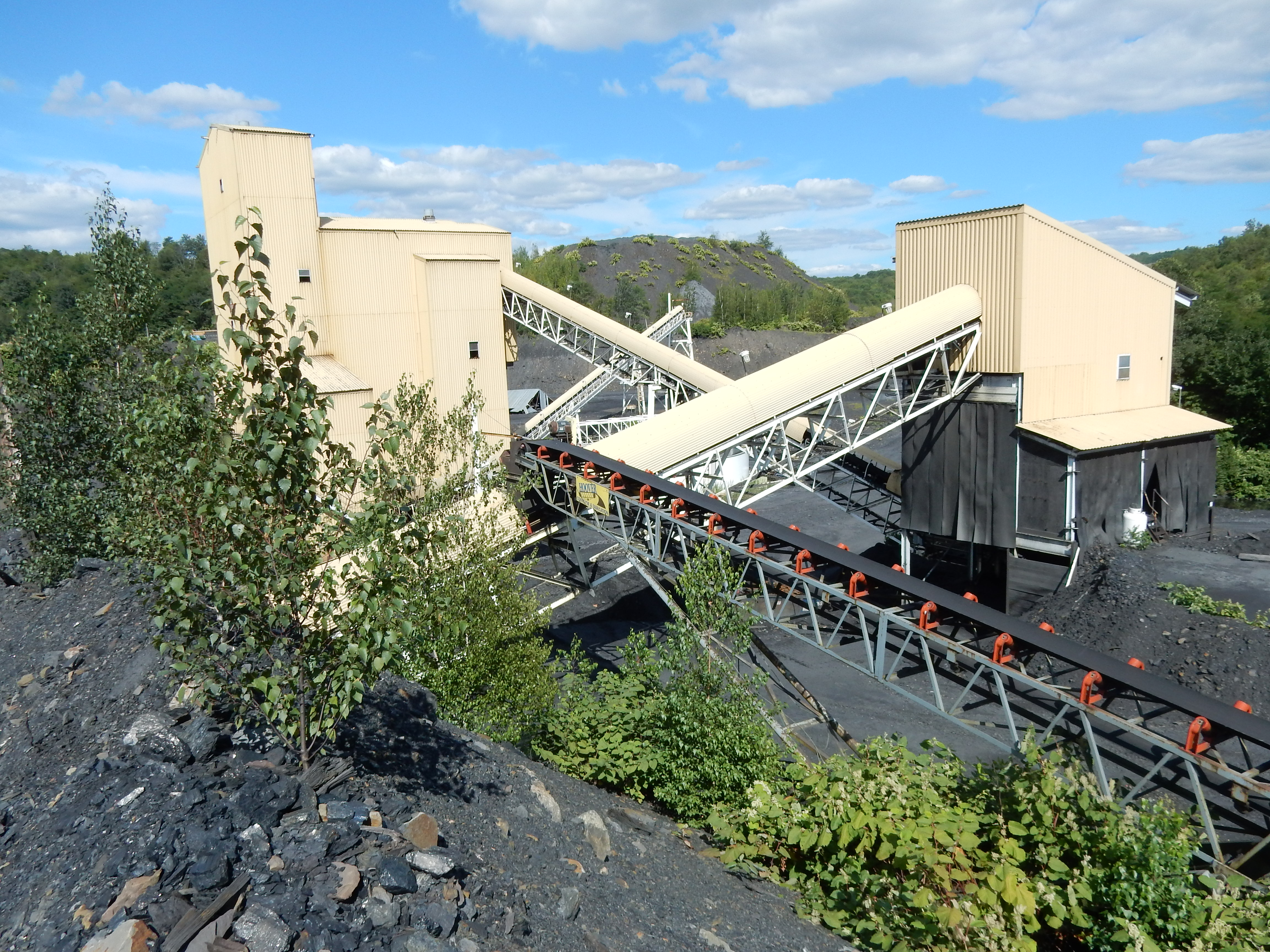
Reading Anthracite Company in Butler Twp.
