= North Schuylkill School District =

School district in Pennsylvania

Coordinates: 40.77516°N 76.29831°W

Location
- 15 Academy Lane; Ashland, Pennsylvania 17921-9301; United States

Information
- Type: Public
- Established: 1966
- Superintendent: Dr. Robert Ackell
- Grades: K–12
- Enrollment: 2,098 (2023–24)
- Color: Crimson Red Royal Blue
- Athletics conference: Schuylkill-Colonial District XI
- Mascot: Spartan
- Rival: Mount Carmel Area Red Tornadoes (Football)
- Yearbook: Odyssey
- Budget: $37,691,750
- Affiliation: Schuylkill Intermediate Unit#29
- Website: www.northschuylkill.net
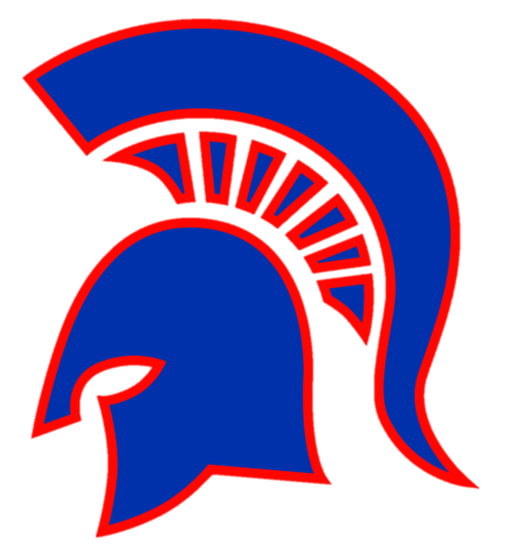

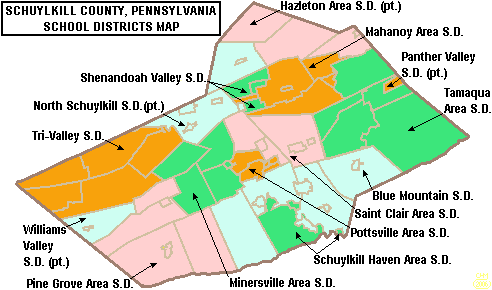
Map of Schuylkill County, Pennsylvania's public school districts with the North Schuylkill School District highlighted in light green in the north portion of the county.

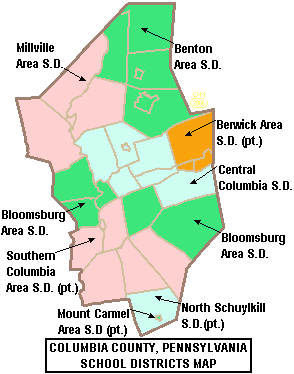
Map of Columbia County, Pennsylvania's public school districts with the North Schuylkill School District highlighted in light green in Conyngham Township southern portion of Columbia County.

The North Schuylkill School District is a midsized, rural/suburban public school district in Schuylkill County, Pennsylvania and Columbia County, Pennsylvania. It includes the municipalities of the Ashland Borough, Butler Township, Conyngham Township (Columbia County), Frackville Borough, Girardville Borough, Gordon Borough, Ringtown Borough, and Union Township. The district encompasses an area of approximately 72 square miles (190 km^{2}). The school district has a population of 16,224, according to the 2020 federal census.

Special education was provided by the district and the Schuylkill Intermediate Unit #29. Occupational training and adult education in various vocational and technical fields were provided by the district and the Schuylkill Technology Centers.

The district operates one elementary school and one junior/senior high school. Grades 1-6 are considered elementary, grades 7-8 are considered junior high, and grades 9-12 are considered high school.
