= Fishing Creek (North Branch Susquehanna River tributary) =

Tributary of river in Pennsylvania

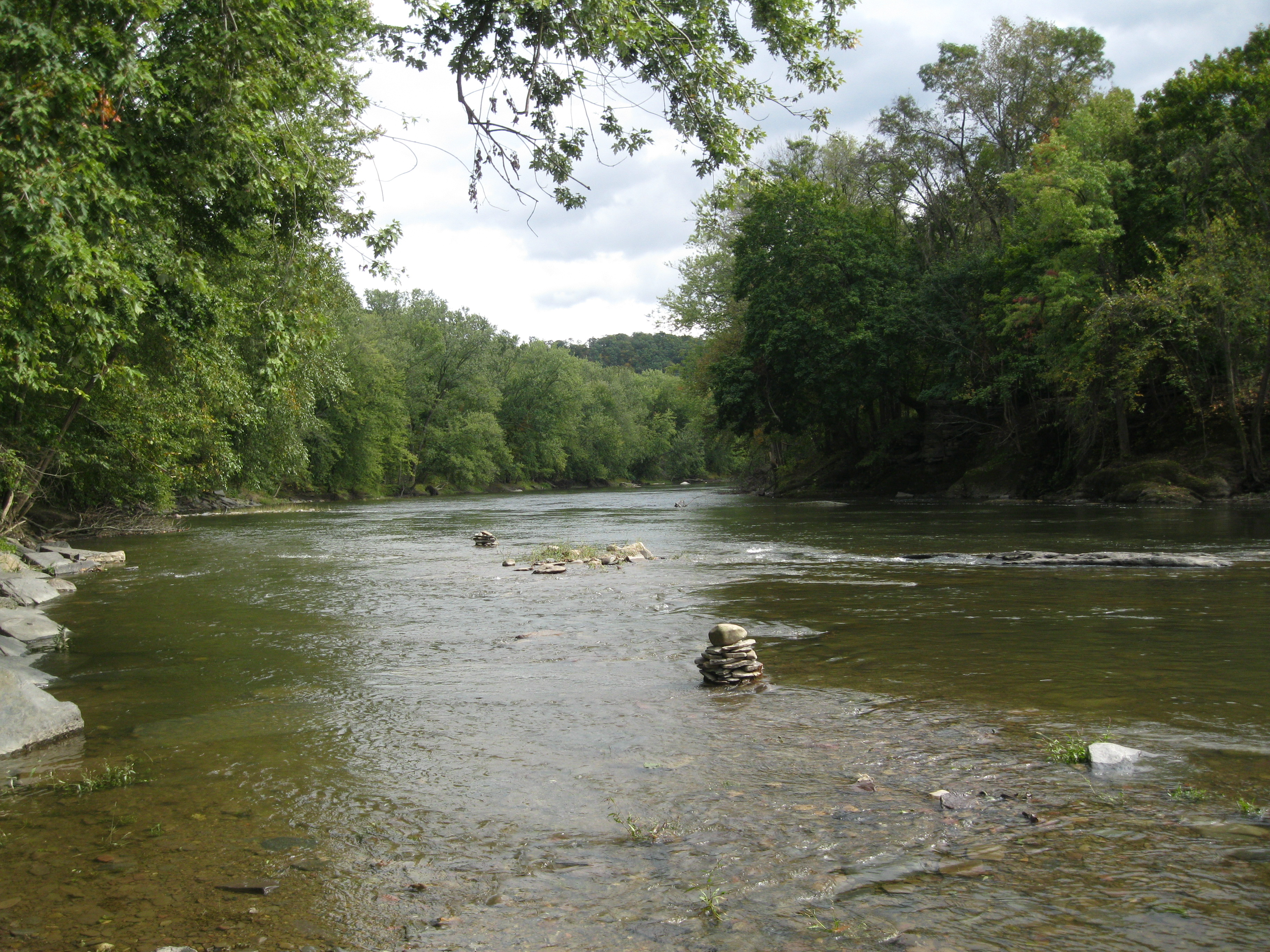
- Fishing Creek near the Rupert Covered Bridge No. 56 between Montour Township and Bloomsburg

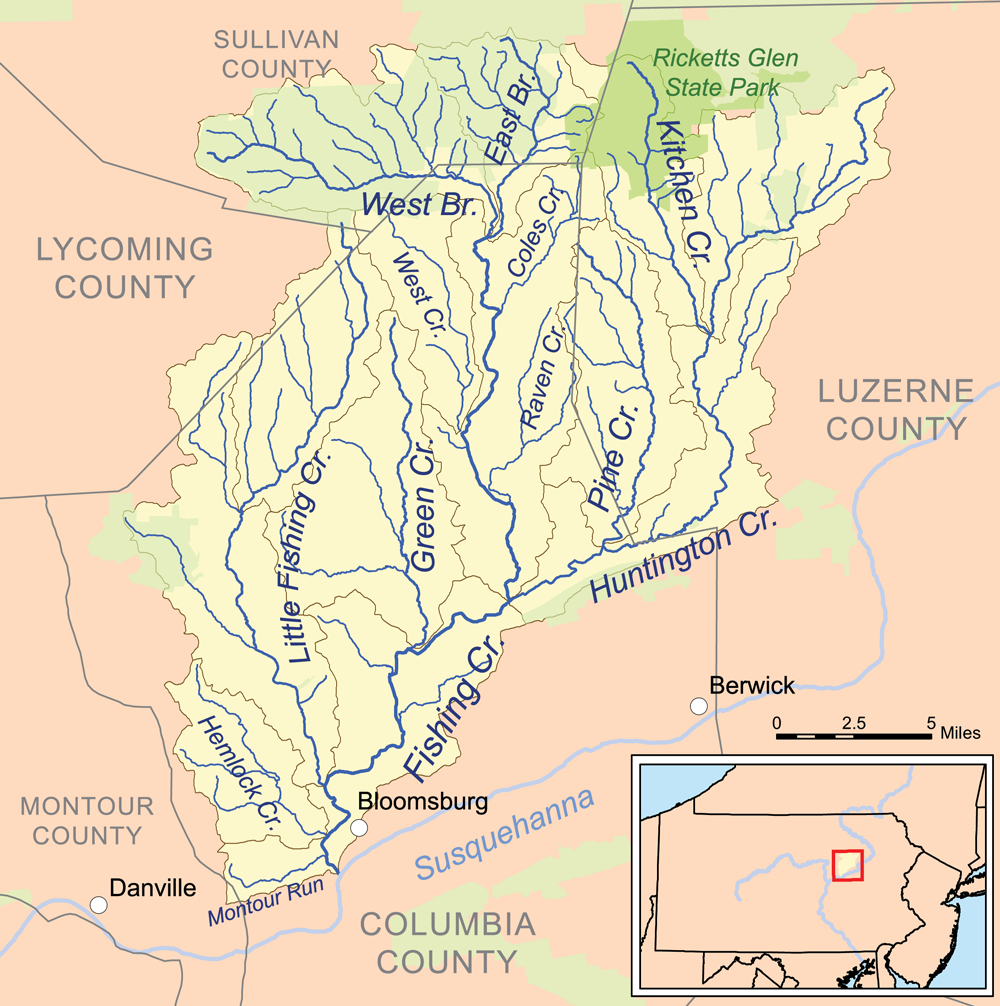
- Map of the Fishing Creek watershed

Location
- Country: United States
- State: Pennsylvania
- Counties: Columbia, Luzerne, Lycoming, Montour, and Sullivan

Physical characteristics
- Source: Confluence of the East and West Branches
  - location: Sugarloaf Township, Columbia County
  - coordinates: 41°16′31″N 076°22′32″W
  - elevation: 920 ft (280 m)
- Mouth: Confluence with the Susquehanna River
  - location: Rupert
  - coordinates: 40°58′38″N 076°28′02″W
  - elevation: 456 ft (139 m)
- Length: 29.98 mi (48.25 km)
- Basin size: 385 mi^{2} (1,000 km^{2})
- Discharge
  - average: 615 cu ft/s (17.4 m^{3}/s)

Basin features
- Tributaries
  - left: East Branch Fishing Creek, Huntington Creek
  - right: West Branch Fishing Creek, West Creek, Culley Run, Green Creek, Little Fishing Creek, Hemlock Creek, Montour Run

Fishing Creek is a 29.98-mile (48.25 km) long tributary of the Susquehanna River in Columbia County, Pennsylvania, in the United States. It joins the Susquehanna River near the census-designated place of Rupert and the town of Bloomsburg. The watershed has an area of 385 square miles (1,000 km^{2}).

Nomadic Native Americans arrived in the lower reaches of Fishing Creek around 8000 BCE, and some were spending winters in the upper reaches of the valley by 3000 to 2000 BCE. In the past few centuries, the Fishing Creek area has been home to many industries, mills, and dams. It drains parts of five Pennsylvania counties: Columbia, Montour, Sullivan, Luzerne, and Lycoming. The creek's main tributaries include Hemlock Creek, Little Fishing Creek, Green Creek, Huntington Creek, West Branch Fishing Creek, and East Branch Fishing Creek.

Public recreation activities include canoeing, birdwatching, and fishing. The creek is known for its trout population, which includes brook, brown and rainbow trout; it also contains many other species of fish. Northern hardwood trees and ruffed grouse live in the surrounding area.

Some stretches of Fishing Creek contain significant amounts of algae because of leaking septic systems in the watershed. The area around the tributary West Creek is the least habitable part of the Fishing Creek area, according to a 2011 study. The water quality of Fishing Creek can vary. Its pH ranges from 4.9 to 8.5, while the concentration of dissolved oxygen ranges from 5 to 17.5 mg per liter. The creek's average discharge is 615 cubic feet per second (17.4 m^{3}/s); its watershed contains gravel, shale and various loams—in particular the Albrights soil series and the Leck Kill soil.

== Course ==
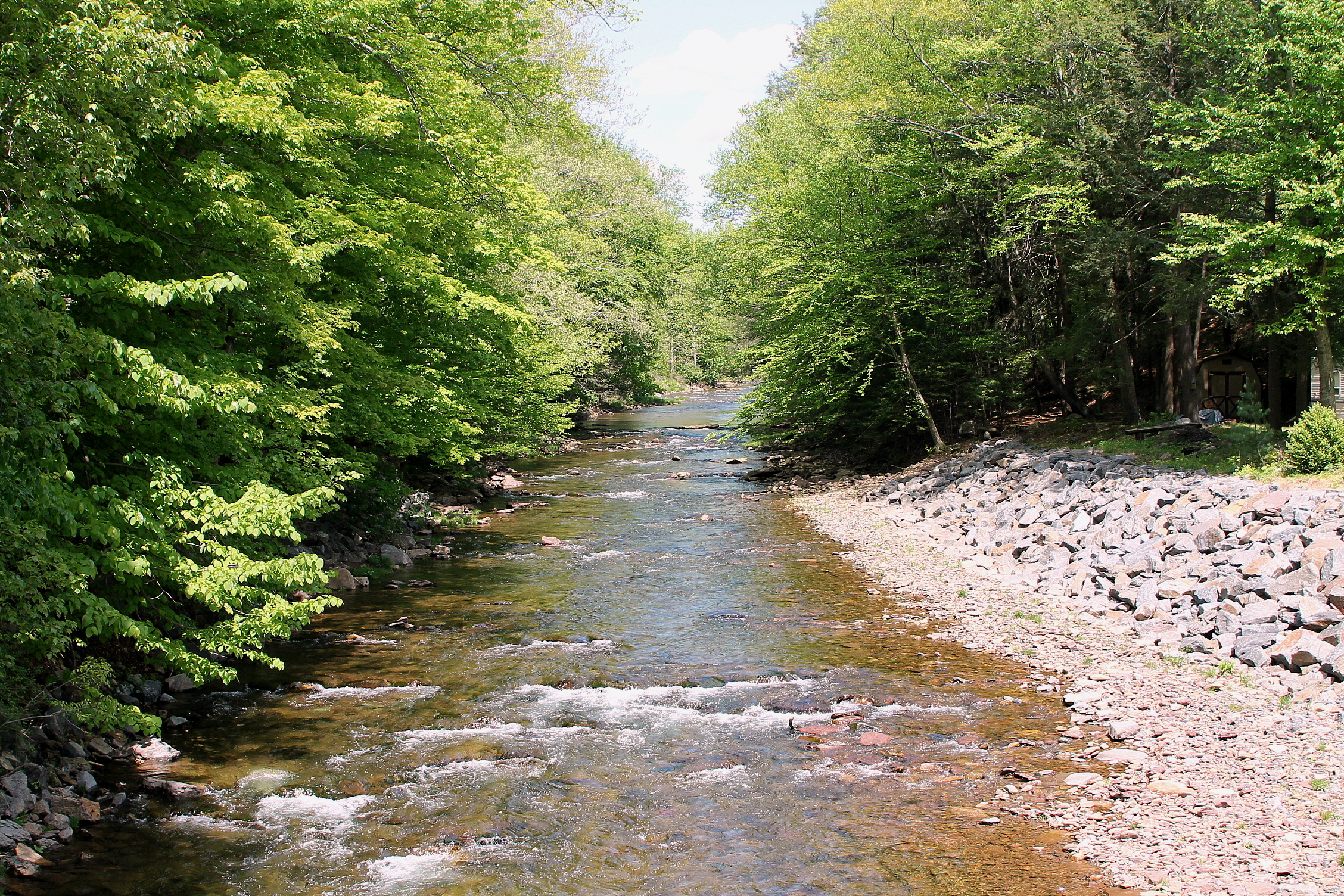
Fishing Creek in Sugarloaf Township

Fishing Creek's source is 920 feet (280 m) above sea level in Sugarloaf Township, south of State Game Lands Number 13 and Pennsylvania Route 118, where East Branch and West Branch Fishing Creeks of southern Sullivan County meet in northern Columbia County. The creek heads approximately south with a few bends through Sugarloaf Township for about 2 miles (3.2 km). In the southern part of the township, it turns east for less than a mile and picks up Coles Creek—its first named tributary after the confluence of the East and West Branches. It empties into Fishing Creek from the northeast, 26.34 miles (42.39 km) upstream of its mouth.

Around this point, Fishing Creek turns sharply south into Benton Township and starts flowing parallel to Pennsylvania Route 487. Here it flows four or five miles, including about a mile in Benton, where West Creek parallels Fishing Creek and empties into it from the west just south of Benton and 21.72 miles (34.95 km) upstream of the mouth. Fishing Creek crosses under Pennsylvania Route 239 and continues approximately south, passing through the community of Maple Grove and flowing into Fishing Creek Township and Stillwater. In Stillwater, Raven Creek empties into the creek from the northeast, 18.62 miles (29.97 km) above the mouth. About 1.5 to 2 miles (2.4–3.2 km) south, the creek turns and picks up Huntington Creek, and then flows past the communities of Zaners, Forks, and Pealertown. The mouth of Huntington Creek is 15.1 miles (24.3 km) above the mouth of Fishing Creek.

Upon leaving Fishing Creek Township, about 1 mile (1.6 km) after picking up Huntington Creek, Fishing Creek flows southwest past Knob Mountain and into Orange Township. It passes near the northern edge of Knob Mountain 2 miles (3.2 km) downstream, then by Orangeville, and makes a 90° turn to the northwest. Shortly after this turn it picks up Green Creek 10.84 miles (17.45 km) above its mouth and turns west. After some distance, it turns south again, passing Bowman Bridge and a gauging station. From this point, the creek flows along the border between Orange and Mount Pleasant Townships for almost 2 miles (3.2 km). While on the border between these two townships, it flows past Kocher Park. The creek stays considerably nearer to the western edge of the river valley than the eastern edge at this point. Near Lightstreet, it turns west into Mount Pleasant Township, passing several lakes and the Turkey Hill Oxbow. Upon entering Mount Pleasant Township, the creek stops paralleling Pennsylvania Route 487 and flows in the vicinity of Interstate 80 for 2 to 3 miles (3.2–4.8 km).

Along the border of Mount Pleasant Township and Bloomsburg, Fishing Creek picks up Little Fishing Creek at a distance of 3.86 miles (6.21 km) upstream of its mouth before turning south and paralleling the western border of Bloomsburg. As it flows between Bloomsburg and Fernville, it turns sharply westward, paralleling U.S. Route 11, and picks up Hemlock Creek, which is 1.52 miles (2.45 km) above the mouth. Shortly after picking up Hemlock Creek, Fishing Creek turns southeast under U.S. Route 11 and flows parallel to Pennsylvania Route 42 for slightly over 1 mile (1.6 km), picking up Montour Run from the right, then empties 0.72 miles (1.16 km) later into the Susquehanna between Bloomsburg and Rupert. The Rupert Covered Bridge No. 56 crosses the main stem of the creek. Its mouth is 456 feet (139 m) above sea level—464 feet (141 m) lower than, and 29.98 miles (48.25 km) downstream of, the source.

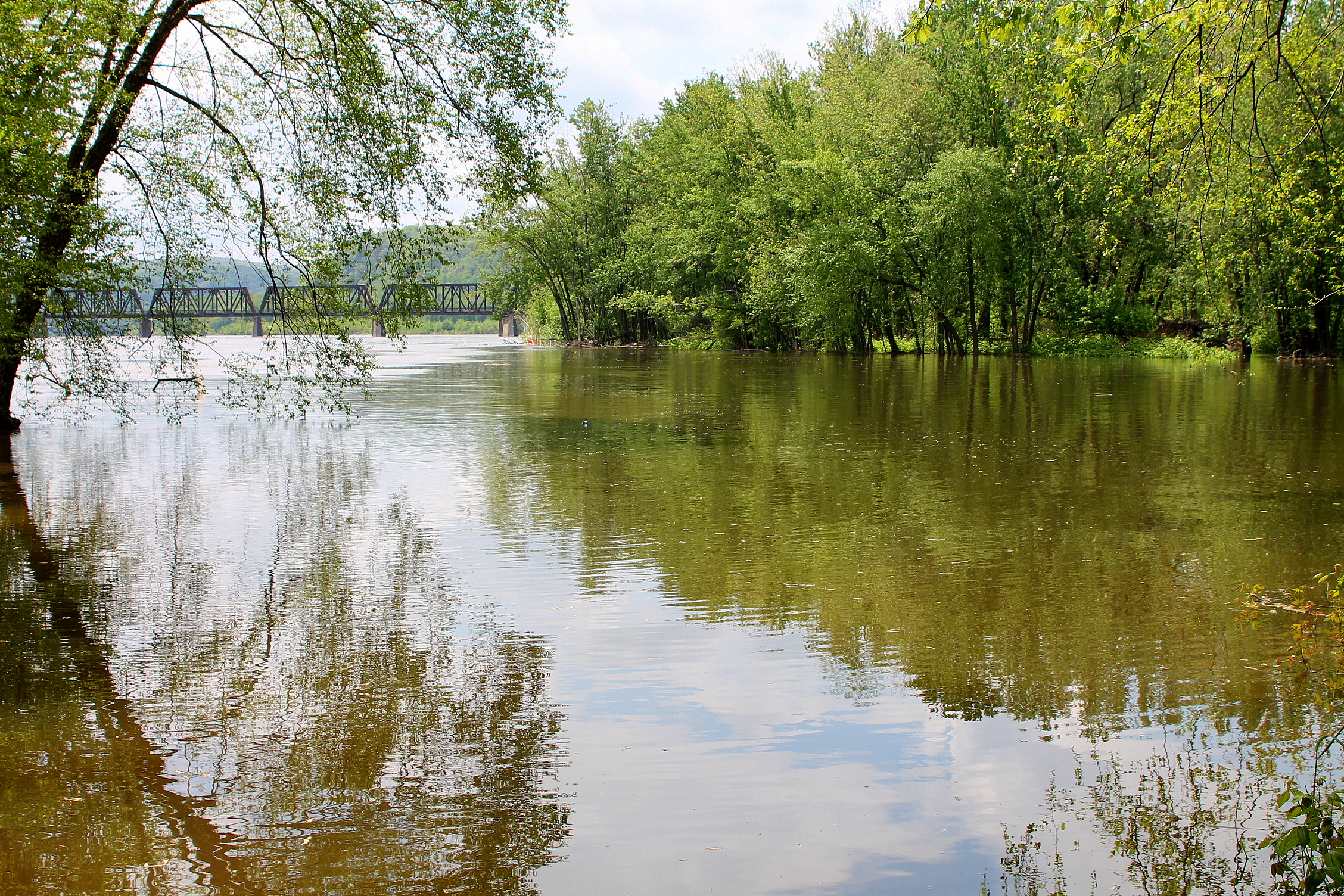
The mouth of Fishing Creek as seen from the Bloomsburg side

=== Tributaries ===
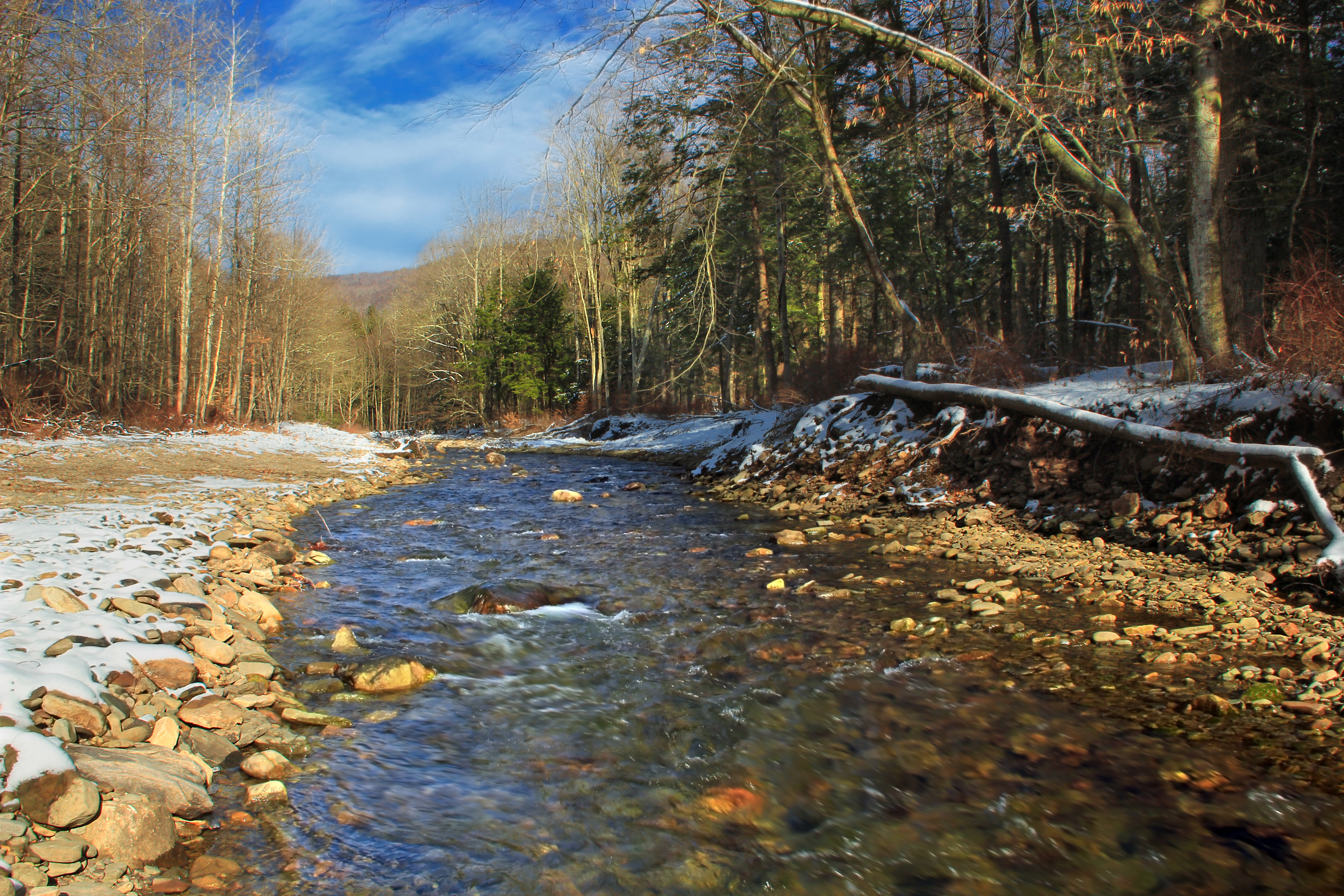
The East Branch of Fishing Creek at the Sullivan County – Columbia County line

Fishing Creek has several major tributaries and numerous minor ones. The major tributaries are Hemlock Creek, Little Fishing Creek, Green Creek, Huntington Creek, and the East and West Branch Fishing Creeks. West Branch Fishing Creek rises on North Mountain and flows east into Fishing Creek. East Branch Fishing Creek is a tributary that starts on North Mountain in Sullivan County and is approximately 4.4 miles (7.1 km) long. Huntington Creek starts in State Game Lands number 57 and heads southwest through Luzerne County until it reaches the north side of Knob Mountain, which it runs parallel to until it merges with Fishing Creek. Huntington Creek drains the eastern and northeastern parts of the Fishing Creek watershed. Four covered bridges cross Huntington Creek; these are the Twin Bridges–East Paden Covered Bridge No. 120, the Twin Bridges–West Paden Covered Bridge No. 121, the Josiah Hess Covered Bridge No. 122, and the Huntington Mills Bridge.

Green Creek rises near Waller and heads roughly south to Rohrsburg and on to Orangeville, where it joins Fishing Creek. It drains the central part of the Fishing Creek watershed. Little Fishing Creek starts just in Lycoming County near the Columbia County Line. It winds through rural areas before reaching Pennsylvania Route 42, which it runs parallel to for the remainder of its length. It drains the western part of the Fishing Creek watershed. Four covered bridges cross Little Fishing Creek; these are the Wanich Covered Bridge No. 69, the Sam Eckman Covered Bridge No. 92, the Jud Christie Covered Bridge No. 95, and the Creasyville Covered Bridge.

Other tributaries of the main stem include Coles Creek and West Creek near Benton, Raven Creek in Fishing Creek Township, Hemlock Creek in Hemlock Township, Montour Run in Montour Township, and Deerlick Run and Stony Brook, both near Orange Township.

== Watershed ==
Fishing Creek drains most of Columbia County north of the Susquehanna River except for an area in the eastern part of the county, which is drained by Briar Creek. It also drains southern Sullivan County and western Luzerne County. Minor tributaries drain small portions of Montour County and southeastern Lycoming County. The upper part of the watershed is 85 percent forest and 13 percent farmland. Near its source, the other two percent is residential; closer to Benton, the remainder is urban. The creek's drainage basin consists of a number of sub-watersheds. The largest ones are the Huntington Creek watershed, with an area of 114 square miles; the Little Fishing Creek watershed, with an area of 68.1 square miles; the Green Creek drainage basin, with an area of 36.9 square miles; and the West Branch Fishing Creek drainage basin, with an area of 32.9 square miles.

=== Oxbow lake ===
Northern Bloomsburg and Scott Township include a small oxbow lake of Fishing Creek; the area around this lake is known as the Turkey Hill Oxbow. The lake is located between Interstate 80 and the forests on the side of Turkey Hill. The oxbow is on a flood plain and includes grasses, forested wetlands, and areas of open water. In wet periods of the year, the Turkey Hill Oxbow lake receives overflow from the waters of Fishing Creek while during dry periods it contains water in only a few places.

Most land around the oxbow is steep. It is covered by hemlock and hardwood forests, as well as skunk cabbage seeps. The forests around the lake also contain black birch, yellow birch, white oak, red oak, sugar maple, tulip poplar, and Norway maple, while the understory contains slippery elm, European privet, Japanese barberry, American elderberry, wild hydrangea, witch hazel, mountain laurel, ironwood, and the rare American yew. The American yew population was in significant decline by 2004 due to heavy grazing by deer.

There are numerous wildflower species in the uplands and rock outcroppings of the Turkey Hill Oxbow. These include white baneberry, northern maidenhair fern, spikenard, blue cohosh, foamflower, false Solomon's seal, purple trillium, and wild columbine. Animals inhabiting the areas surrounding the pools include pickerel frogs, green frogs, wood ducks, and snapping turtles. Plants in this location include broadleaf arrowhead, northern blueflag, manna grasses, water starwort, and several varieties of sedges. Japanese knotweed has been seen near Interstate 80 on the northern edges of the Turkey Hill Oxbow.

== History ==
=== Native American settlement ===
Having first inhabited Pennsylvania between 16,000 and 10,000 BCE, nomadic Native Americans reached the area near the mouth of Fishing Creek by 8000 BCE. By 3000 to 2000 BCE, some of them were going into the Fishing Creek valley during the winter to hunt deer and bears and returning to the Susquehanna River in the summer, creating trade routes. There was no permanent habitation until 1000 BCE when some Native American villages were built at the mouth of Fishing Creek. The Native Americans who settled in this area included the Shawnee and Susquehannock Indians. A Native American path ran along the creek from Bloomsburg to Orangeville before turning away in the direction of Tunkhannock Creek. Since at least 1769, there has also been a path between the mouths of Huntington and Green Creeks.

=== European settlement ===
The first lots at the mouth of Fishing Creek were surveyed in 1769 when European settlers began moving into the area, and in the same year, the Penn family purchased 1,060 acres (430 hectares) of land 2 miles (3.2 km) upstream of Benton. In 1778, Moses Van Campen built a fort of logs covered with earth with a small swivel cannon on Fishing Creek to protect settlers on the frontier. There were settlers on the creek in Orange Township in 1780, and the Fishing Creek valley north of Orangeville, in what is now Stillwater, was first settled in 1783 by Daniel McHenry. The headwaters of the creek were settled in the late 1780s and early 1790s. Leonard Rupert established a ferry on the creek in 1786. The first sawmill on the upper portion of Fishing Creek was built in the late 1790s; it was destroyed in a flood in 1848.

The first mill in Sugarloaf Township was built alongside Fishing Creek in 1802, and another mill in the same township was noted for its buckwheat flour. A schoolhouse had been built by 1806. In 1818, John Barton built a flour and grist mill on Fishing Creek. It was destroyed by fire in 1855 and again in 1905. Although rebuilt, it burned down again in 1932. Another gristmill stood on the creek until 1830 when it was converted into a paper mill. Iron ore was discovered in the area of Fishing Creek in 1822, and in 1844, an anthracite-burning furnace was built on the creek near Bloomsburg. In the 19th century, an aqueduct was built across the creek. From around 1840 to 1900, the wagon-making industry was important to the upper Fishing Creek area. Another historic industry was the Susquehanna Slate Company, which operated in the late 19th century. The Fishing Creek Confederacy (August–November 1864) during the American Civil War was a suspected uprising of a high number of deserters and draft evaders. A thousand soldiers occupied and searched the Fishing Creek valley and the mountains of its headwaters but were unable to find any deserters. Nevertheless, 100 residents of Columbia County were arrested and imprisoned for desertion and draft evasion although most were later released. Starting in 1877, the Bloomsburg Water Company used Fishing Creek as its water supply. The Bloomsburg and Sullivan Railroad, which paralleled the creek, was built in 1888.

There were limestone mines at the junction of Fishing Creek and Little Fishing Creek, but these have not been used since at least 1887. During the Great Depression, a beach was constructed on the creek near Fernville by the Works Progress Administration. After the creek flooded in 1972 from Hurricane Agnes, a flash flood warning system was installed there. In 2002, a tract of land from the Custer/Kocher homestead on Fishing Creek near Lightstreet was converted into a park called the Frank W. Kocher Memorial Park, which was later expanded to cover 7 acres (2.8 ha). In the 21st century, the only significant industry in the watershed is the Benton Foundry.

== Hydrology ==
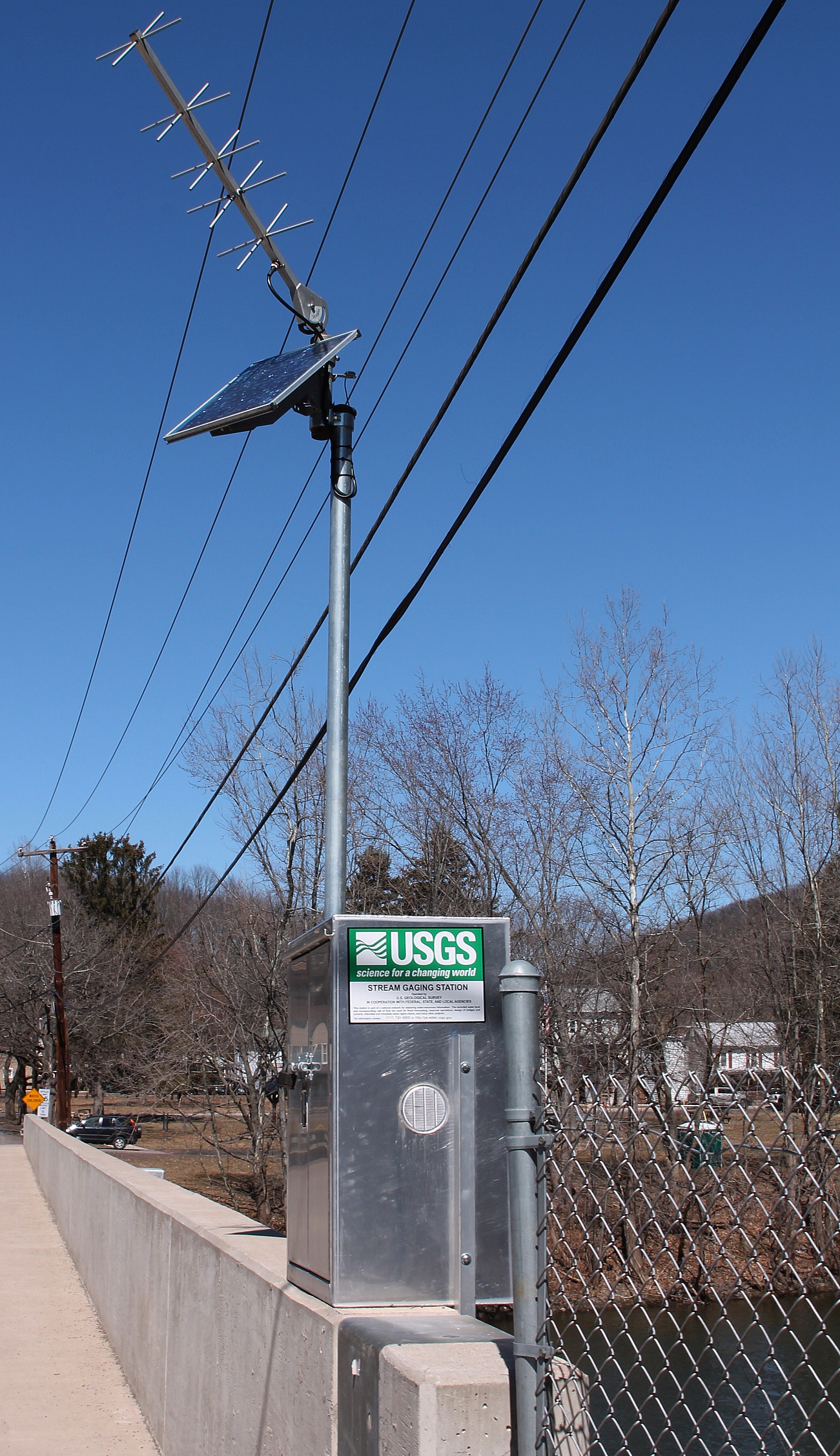
USGS gauging station on Fishing Creek at Bloomsburg

Approximately 1 mile (1.6 km) downstream of Orangeville a gauging station was established on the creek in 1938. Other monitoring of the creek has included detailed studies at a stream-gauging station near Bloomsburg, which operated from 2002 to 2012.

=== Discharge ===
Just downstream of Orangeville, Fishing Creek's discharge averages 615 cubic feet per second (17.4 m^{3}/s), with a median of 361 cubic feet per second (10.2 m^{3}/s). The lowest recorded discharge was 90 cubic feet per second (2.5 m^{3}/s) while the highest was 2,580 cubic feet per second (73 m^{3}/s). Further upstream in Benton, it is almost always less than 720 cubic feet per second (20 m^{3}/s), and usually approaches zero during the summer. The typical discharge is around 540 cubic feet per second (15 m^{3}/s). In years of drought, the streambeds of West Branch and East Branch Fishing Creeks typically run dry for 105 days over summer; even in wet years they are dry for an average of 5 days. Near Bloomsburg, Fishing Creek's discharge has ranged between 10 cubic feet per second (0.28 m^{3}/s) and 5,350 cubic feet per second (151 m^{3}/s).

=== pH ===
Near Benton, Fishing Creek's pH ranges from around 5.6 to 7.25, while near Bloomsburg, a wider range has been recorded, from 5.8 to 8.5. Near Camp Lavigne, it ranges from 5.5 to 7.1. East Branch Fishing Creek is the only stream in the watershed whose pH drops below 5.5; it can fall as low as 4.9. West Creek and Coles Creek are the least acidic streams in the watershed, with pH levels usually above 6.3 and often above 7. Typically, the creek and its tributaries are not at risk of becoming too acidic for the optimal health of fish, but in early spring during snowmelts, the levels approach the limit that brook trout can tolerate. Fishing Creek's waters are acidic because of acid rain.

=== Dissolved chemicals ===
==== Nonmetals ====
The concentration of dissolved oxygen in Fishing Creek ranges from approximately 5 to 17.5 mg/L at Benton. A site near Camp Lavigne had slightly less variability, ranging from 8 to 17 mg/L. The concentration near Bloomsburg ranged between 4.1 and 17.1 mg/L, with an average of 10.9 mg/L. The amount of carbon dioxide near Bloomsburg ranged from 0.3 to 34 mg/L, with an average of 2.04 mg/L.

The total concentration of nitrogen near Bloomsburg between 2002 and 2012 ranged from 0.52 to 2.8 mg/L. The average concentration was 1.212 mg/L. The ammonia levels in the creek ranged from less than 0.02 mg/L to 0.06 mg/L, while the concentration of nitrates was always less than 0.04 mg/L. The total concentration of phosphates ranged from less than 0.031 mg/L to 0.11 mg/L, while for phosphorus the figures ranged from less than 0.01 mg/L to 0.575 mg/L.

The total concentration of dissolved solids near Bloomsburg ranges from less than 2 to 166 mg/L.

==== Metals ====
In most places on Fishing Creek, there is not enough dissolved aluminum to be toxic, although East Branch Fishing Creek has aluminum concentrations of over 100 μg per liter, approaching a lethal level for fish. Fishing Creek itself and all its other tributaries have concentrations of less than 70 μg per liter. The concentration is seasonal: aluminum trapped in frozen ground is released into the streams when the soil thaws. As a result, aluminum levels in the creek peak in March and April and drop to almost zero in the summer.

The concentration of calcium at the gauging station near Bloomsburg has ranged from 5.5 mg/L to 26 mg/L, averaging 7.532 mg/L. The concentration of magnesium has ranged from 1.5 mg/L to 6.7 mg/L, with an average of 1.748 mg/L.

=== Dams ===
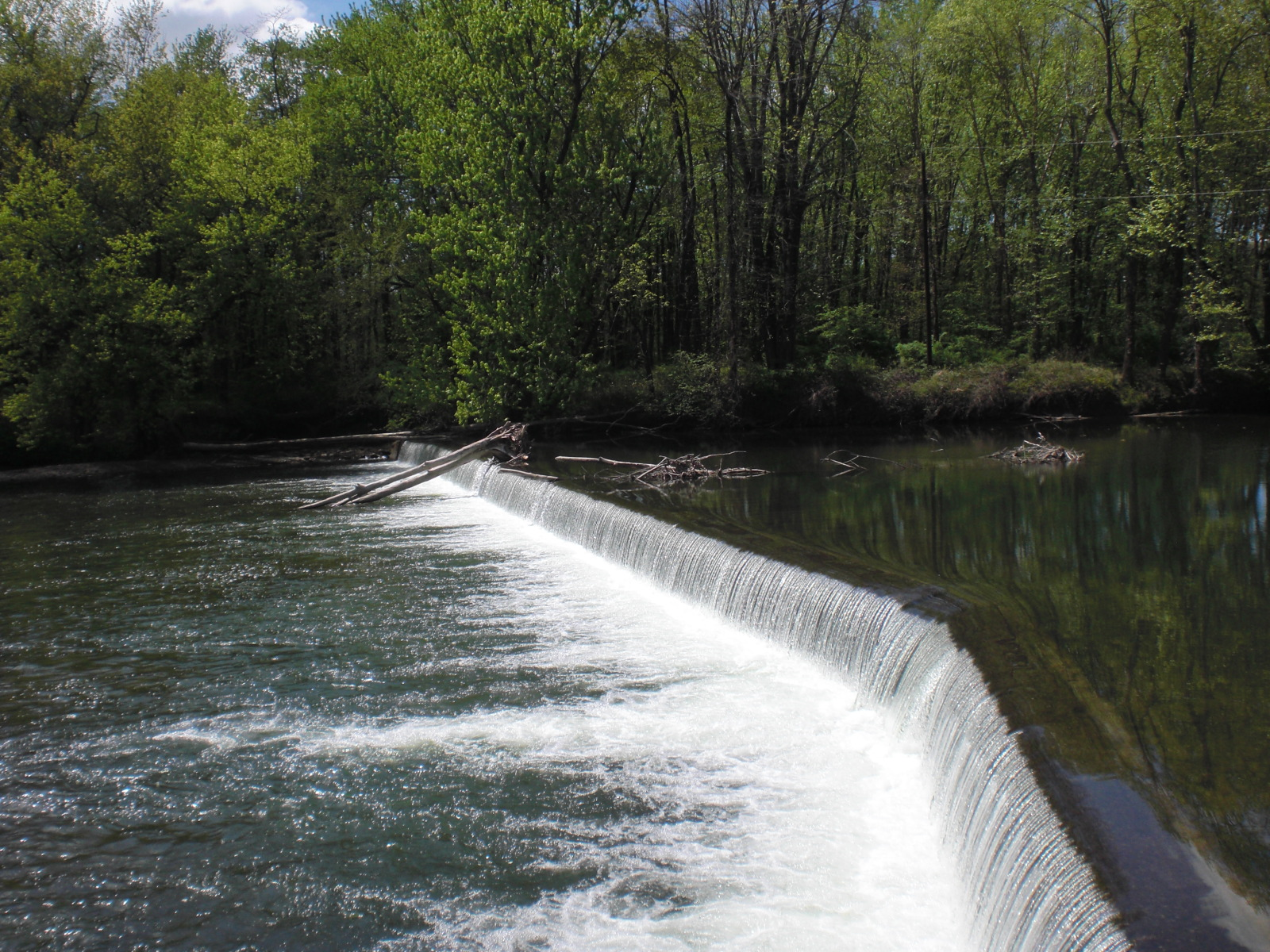
Boone's Dam near Bloomsburg, Pennsylvania

There are five dams on Fishing Creek. The lowhead dam called Boone's Dam is the furthest downstream, in Montour Township. It is 4.5 feet (1.4 m) high and 253 feet (77 m) long. Further upstream is the Diverting Dam, a 2-foot (0.61-meter) high and 100-foot (30-meter) long dam in Bloomsburg. It was built to power the nearby Irondale furnaces. A 380-foot (120 m) wide and 5-foot (1.5 m) high unnamed dam is on the creek further upstream, in Mount Pleasant Township. The uppermost dams are the 130-foot (40 m) wide and 11-foot (3.4 m) high Benton Dam and the 150-foot (46 m) wide and 6-foot (1.8 m) high Mill Dam, which are in Benton Township and Benton. Additionally, the Jonestown Dam is on the tributary Huntington Creek in Jonestown. This dam is 8 feet (2.4 m) high and 120 feet (37 m) wide.

=== Water temperature ===
The highest water temperature is at West Creek, which can reach 77 °F (25 °C) in the summer. In Benton, Fishing Creek can reach 75 °F (24 °C) in the summer while Coles Creek only reaches 66 to 68 °F (19 to 20 °C). In the winter, the water in the main stem is around 32 °F (0 °C), while in West Branch Fishing Creek it can drop to 28 °F (−2 °C) in the winter, making it the coldest stream in the watershed. At the gauging station near Bloomsburg, the temperature has ranged from 32 to 78 °F (0 to 26 °C); it was at its lowest on January 10, 2011. The highest temperature occurred on August 3, 2006. The average temperature in August was 72.81 °F (22.67 °C) and the average water temperature in January was 35.46 °F (1.92 °C). The temperature has averaged approximately 53.65 °F (12.03 °C).

== Geology ==
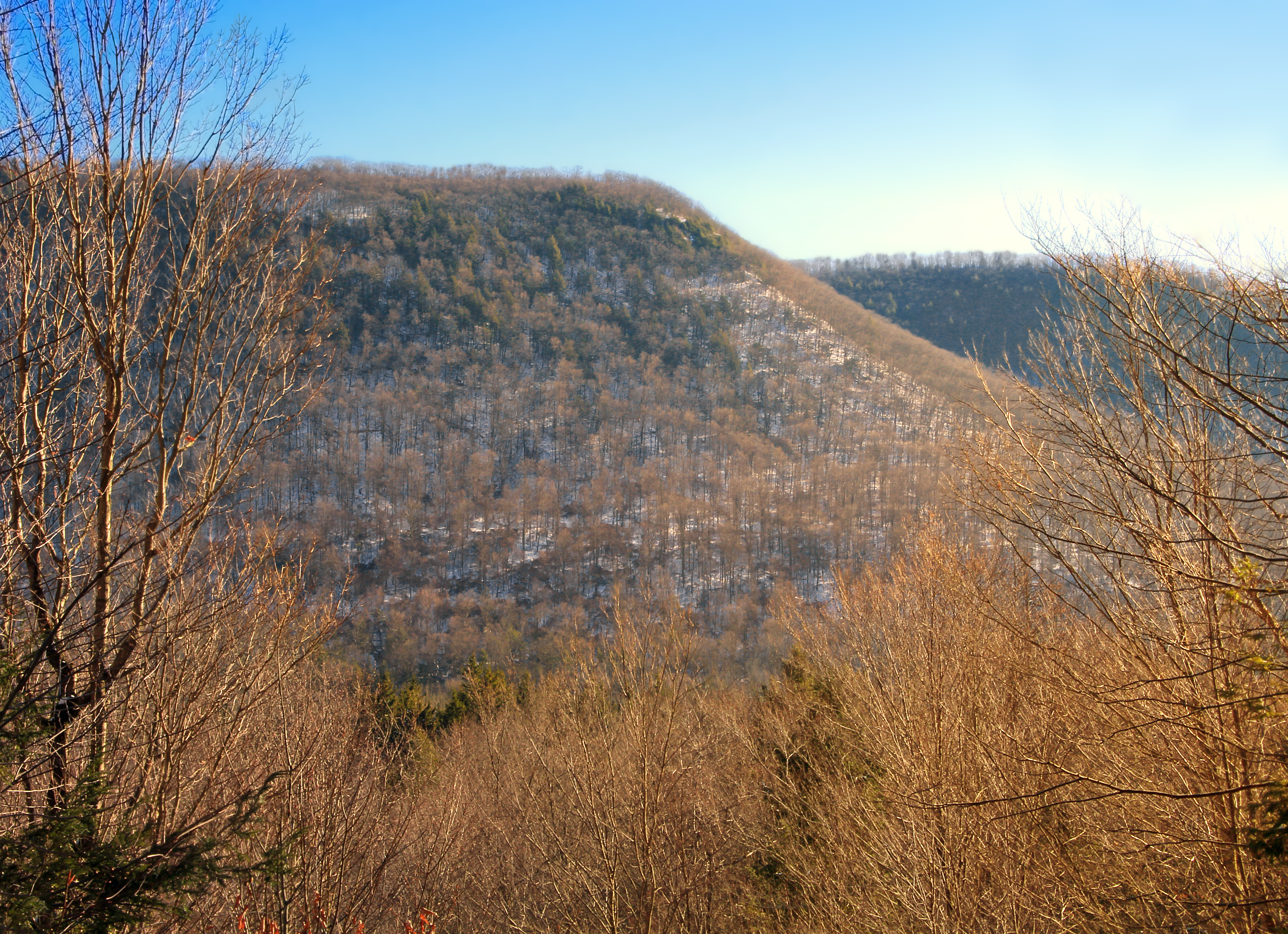
The Fishing Creek valley in the Allegheny Front in the Deep Valley section of the Allegheny Plateau

The Fishing Creek watershed has been affected by glaciation, which has left a glacial till near the source and glacial outwash in the lower parts of the watershed. The watershed lies in two major geological regions: the Deep Valley section of the Allegheny Plateau and the Susquehanna Lowlands Section. The Allegheny Plateau lies in the upper reaches of the watershed and is characterized by deep valleys and rounded mountains with elevations of around 2,400 feet (730 m). The Susquehanna Lowlands section is characterized by linear ridges of moderate elevation and valleys less steep than those of the Deep Valley region. There are also flood plains along the creek. Near its mouth, it cuts through Montour Ridge, and a basalt-containing section of the Catskill Formation extends to the creek's banks in Hemlock Township. Other rock formations along the banks include the Clinton Formation, the Selena Formation, the Lower Helderburg Formation, and the Hamilton Formation. There is a terminal moraine, which crosses the creek near Benton.

The bed of Fishing Creek contains red and brown shale in some places. Other parts of the watershed lie over gray sandstone or conglomerates. There are numerous deposits of iron ore, limestone and marble in the watershed of Fishing Creek. Most of the rock in the watershed, including the Trimmers Rock Formation and Catskill Formation, is from the Devonian Period, but some of the northernmost tributaries have watersheds on rock from the Mississippian Period, such as the Huntley Mountain Formation and Burgoon sandstone. The creek is a freestone stream although its water is colder than that of most eastern freestone streams.

Areas along Fishing Creek contain pools followed by riffles, which are further followed by more pools. This configuration of pools and riffles creates an ideal situation for fly-fishing. The lower part of the creek forms one side of a triangle of low-lying land in western Bloomsburg, which floods severely during heavy rains.

=== Soil ===
The main soil in the area of Fishing Creek belongs to the Albrights series, which contains a 7-inch (18 cm) layer of sticky, reddish-brown, gravelly silt loam. Below this is a layer of yellowish-red, gravelly, silty clay loam, which extends to approximately 30 inches (76 cm) below ground and lies over a layer of equal portions of gravel and silty clay loam. Bedrock occurs several feet below the surface. The top 8 inches (20 cm) of the Leck Kill-Meckesville-Calvin series in the watershed is dark brown silt loam with small pieces of sandstone and shale. A subsoil of reddish-brown silt loam from 8 to 32 inches (20 to 81 cm) below ground is followed by a 6-inch (15 cm) layer of sticky clay loam, below which is a bedrock of red shale.

The Barbour series occurs near the source of the creek. It is topped with a crumbly, 10-inch (25 cm) layer of brownish-red silt loam over a loose subsoil of reddish-brown loam with some gravel. The top layer can easily be penetrated by roots and water. Further down is a layer of reddish-brown gravel and sand, which extends to 10 feet (3.0 m) or more underground. The Basher series also occurs along upper Fishing Creek. The top layer is a loose, crumbly, reddish-brown sandy loam extending to 9 inches (23 cm) underground, and the subsoil is a loose, porous, reddish-brown sandy loam with some gravel, extending to 20 inches (51 cm) underground. Lower down, there is a layer of red sandy loam with some gravel that extends from 15 to 30 inches (38 to 76 cm) underground.

The Pekin series is found along Fishing Creek and its tributary Huntington Creek. The uppermost layer, a dark brown silt loam that extends to 8 inches (20 cm) underground, lies over a layer of brown silt loam with 10 percent gravel extending 16 inches (41 cm) underground. The subsoil is mottled, brown, silty clay loam with cobbles and extends to 40 inches (100 cm) underground. Bedrock occurs at a depth of 6 to 40 feet (1.8 to 12.2 m) underground. The Pekin soils near the creek contain more cobbles than typical Pekin soils. Soils of the Chen1ango-Pope-Holly series have also been found along it.

In 1914 the soils of the Fishing Creek watershed were found to yield large quantities of farm crops. Potatoes yielded 100 to 200 bushels per acre, corn 70 to 90 bushels per acre, oats 40 bushels per acre, wheat 20 to 30 bushels per acre, and hay one to two tons per acre. J. H. Battle's 1887 History of Columbia and Montour Counties, Pennsylvania stated that the Fishing Creek valley was fertile.

== Biology ==
Benthic algae densely cover the bed of Fishing Creek, their preponderance attributed to leaking septic systems. At one location on the main stem downstream of Grassmere Park, coverage exceeds 60 percent. The dominant algal organism on West Branch Fishing Creek near the village of Elk Grove is Cladophora. The green algae Tetraspora dominates the stretch of Fishing Creek for 3 miles (4.8 km) downstream of Grassmere Park, where it covers 80 percent of the riverbed. South of Pennsylvania Route 239's crossing of the creek, the dominant algal organisms are Microspora, Mougeotia, and Spirogyra. In the fall, decomposing algae covers 50 percent of the riverbed.

Thirty-six species of macroinvertebrates live in Fishing Creek. The highest level of macroinvertebrate biodiversity on upper Fishing Creek is near Grassmere Park while the lowest is in Benton. The number of these organisms per square meter on Fishing Creek ranges from under 200 in Benton to nearly 400 halfway between Coles Creek and Benton. The highest density of them in the watershed occurs at West Creek where there are between 600 and almost 900 per m^{2} and the lowest density occurs at a site on East Branch Fishing Creek, where there are approximately 100 per m^{2}.

Some of Fishing Creek is stocked by the Fishing Creek Sportsman's Association and contains populations of brook trout, rainbow trout, and brown trout. Many of them are sizable; the largest one caught in Fishing Creek weighed 8 pounds (3.6 kg) and was 28 inches (71 cm) long. All streams in the watershed are suitable for trout habitation according to the Pennsylvania Fish and Boat Commission. An 1887 book stated that Fishing Creek and its tributaries may have once been "alive with trout". In the upper part of the watershed, wild brook trout are most common in West Branch Fishing Creek and fish in general are least common in East Branch Fishing Creek. West Creek has higher fish diversity than any other stream in the upper part of the watershed and is also the only place that is inhabited by wild brown trout. In addition, sculpin and cutlips minnow have been observed in large numbers in the creek and its tributaries. Less commonly observed fish in the upper part of the watershed include johnny darters, white suckers, and black-nosed dace. It is difficult for fish to spawn in the creek because of poor water quality near Benton, a lack of food, and dry headwaters for part of the year. The fish diversity in East Branch Fishing Creek and West Branch Fishing Creek is also significantly affected by episodic acidification, which is caused by acid rain falling in areas with no limestone in the bedrock. The main stem experiences similar problems but to a lesser extent, and the tributaries Coles Creek and West Creek experience the problems even less.

Northern hardwood trees are common in the Fishing Creek watershed. Ruffed grouse are common along Little Fishing Creek and its tributaries north of Iola. There are populations of Japanese knotweed, an invasive plant, along the creek and its tributaries south of Pennsylvania Route 118.

=== Habitat quality ===
In 2011, the habitat quality of upper Fishing Creek and its tributaries were rated on a scale of 1 to 200 (with a higher rating indicating better habitability) by Point Park University and the Fishing Creek Sportsmans' Association. Most of this part of the creek and its tributaries were rated 166 or higher, which was considered optimal. The waters near the mouths of West Branch and East Branch Fishing Creeks, and Fishing Creek near Benton, were rated 113 to 160, considered suboptimal. A portion of West Creek was rated 60–112, considered marginal.

The highest Shannon Diversity Index of any stream in the Fishing Creek watershed is around 2.75, for West Branch Fishing Creek. This value is closely followed by that of West Creek, which has an index of 2.5 to 2.6. The lowest value in the watershed is that of East Branch Fishing Creek, which is around 1.2. The main stem has a Shannon Diversity Index of 2.1 to 2.4, depending on the site.

The Fishing Creek Sportsmans' Association has proposed a number of methods to conserve Fishing Creek and its tributaries. These include planting riparian buffers, eliminating leaky septic systems, and protecting the area from hydraulic fracturing.

== Recreation ==
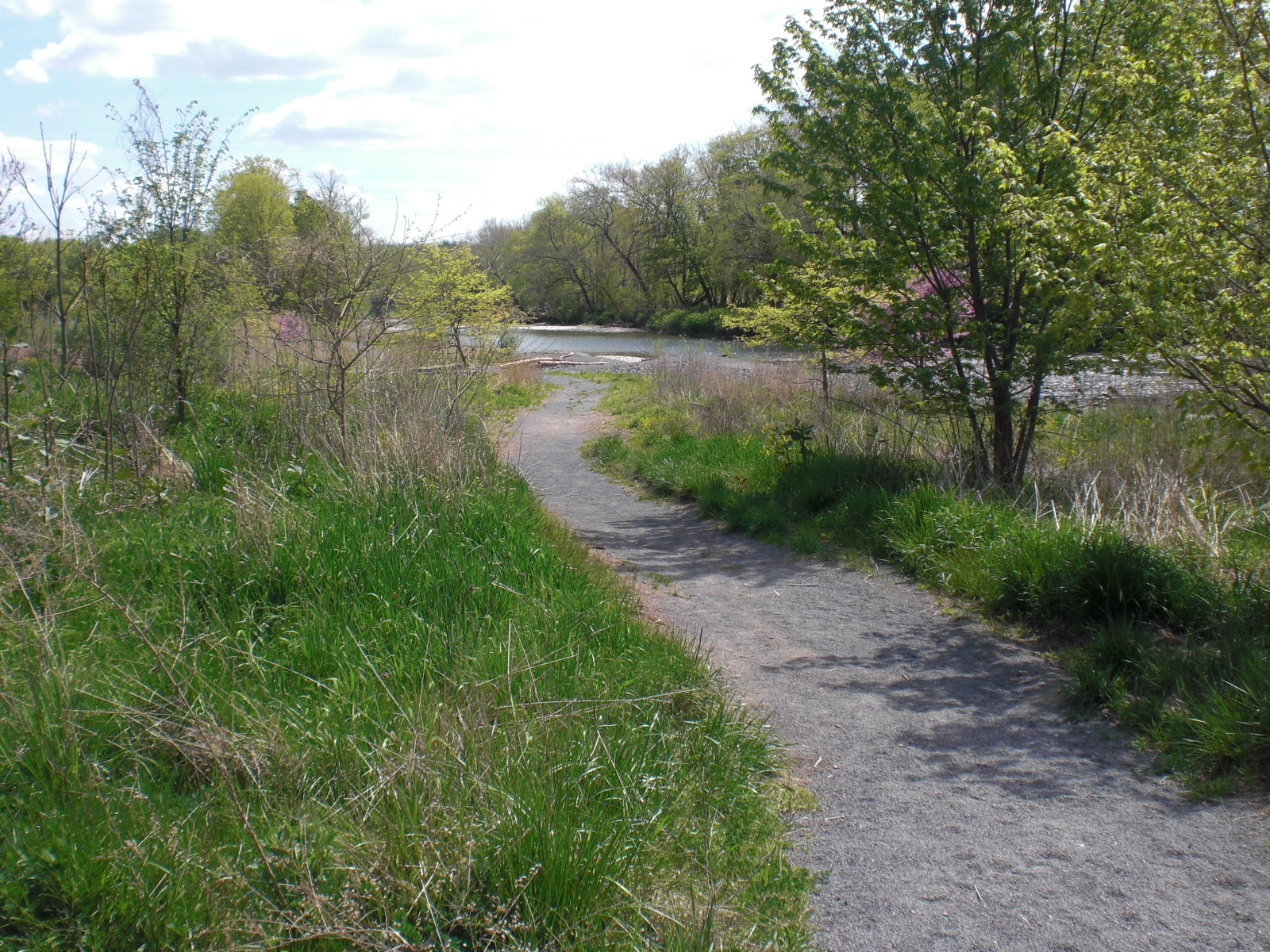
Kocher Park, with Fishing Creek in the background

The Fishing Creek Watershed Association plans to open a public section of the creek that stretches for 6,500 feet (2,000 meters), with a park of 92 acres (37.2 ha). There are other tracts of public property along the creek, one of which, called the Power Dam, is 2 miles (3.2 km) upstream of Benton. It covers 19 acres (7.7 ha) and stretches for 2,900 feet (880 meters) of Fishing Creek, and contains the remains of a concrete dam. Another public area is the Benton Overlook 1 mile (1.6 km) into Benton, which covers 42 acres (17.0 ha) and stretches for 2,600 feet (790 meters) near the creek. A public site at the Zaners Bridge in Zaner 2.5 miles (4.0 km) downstream from Stillwater covers 31 acres (12.5 ha) along about 1,000 feet (300 meters) of the creek and contains an abandoned railroad grade.

The Grassmere Park Campground was established in the early 1900s on Fishing Creek. Further downstream, near Lightstreet, is Kocher Park, which occupies more than 7 acres (2.8 ha). Typical activities there include canoeing, dog walking, birdwatching and fishing.

The western part of Pennsylvania State Game Lands Number 13 is in a gorge cut by West Branch Fishing Creek. These state game lands have an area of 50,000 acres and feature many forest roads and old grades. The hiking trail Waterfall Wonderland, which affords views of Big, Twin, Lewis, and Sullivan Falls, is described as "a place of almost mystical beauty" by Jeff Mitchell in his book Hiking the Endless Mountains: Exploring the Wilderness of Northeastern Pennsylvania. The state game lands are less crowded than the nearby Ricketts Glen State Park.

The Jakey Hollow Natural Area is on a small tributary of Little Fishing Creek. It is near Mordansville and features old-growth forests. The natural area is one of the smallest in Pennsylvania.

== See also ==
- Corn Run, next tributary of the Susquehanna River going downriver
- Kinney Run, next tributary of the Susquehanna River going upriver
- List of rivers of Pennsylvania
