= Fishing Creek Township, Columbia County, Pennsylvania =

Township in Pennsylvania, US

Coordinates: 41°08′00″N 76°22′59″W

Fishing Creek Township, Pennsylvania
- Township
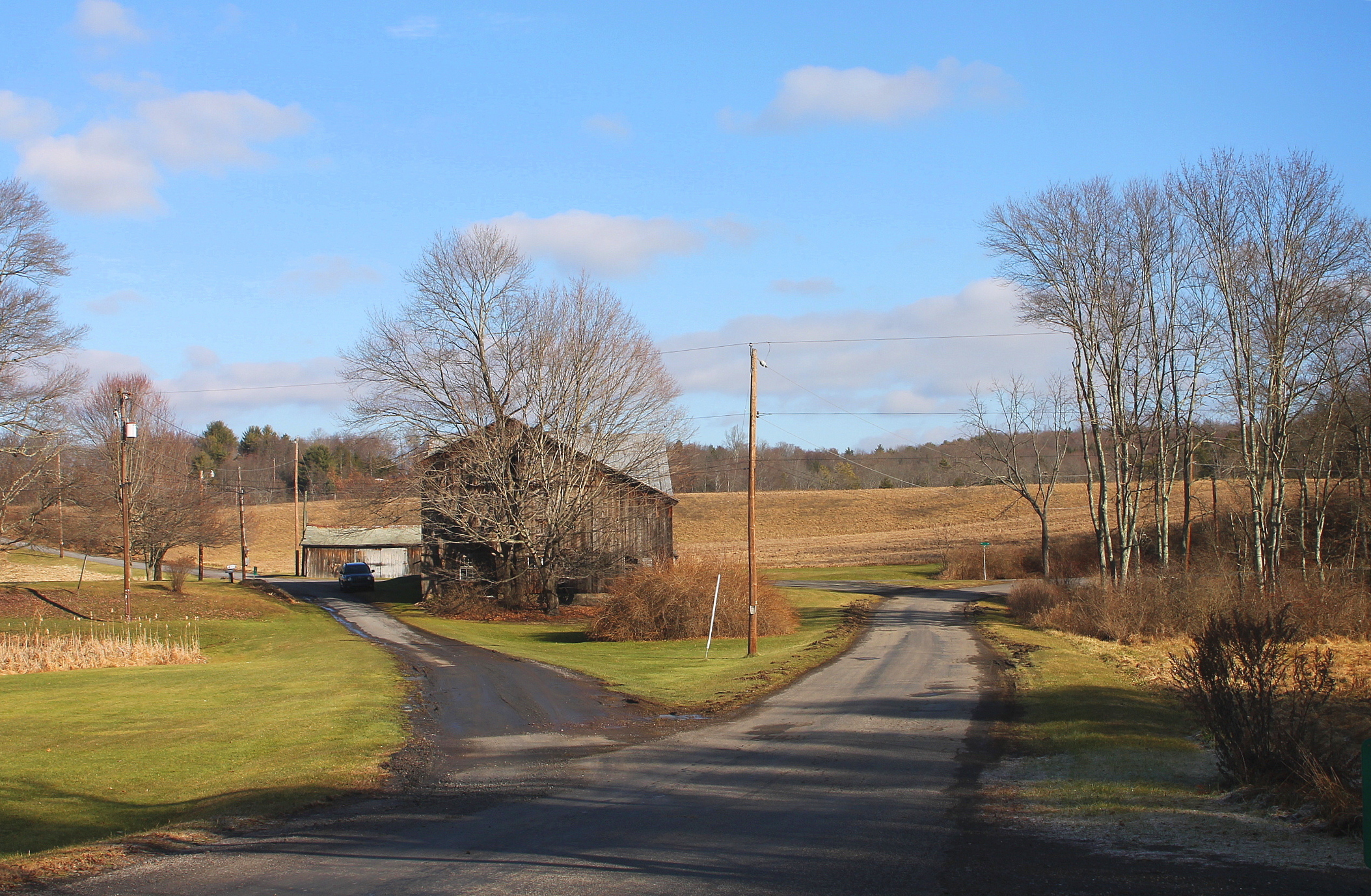
- View of Fishing Creek Township in early winter

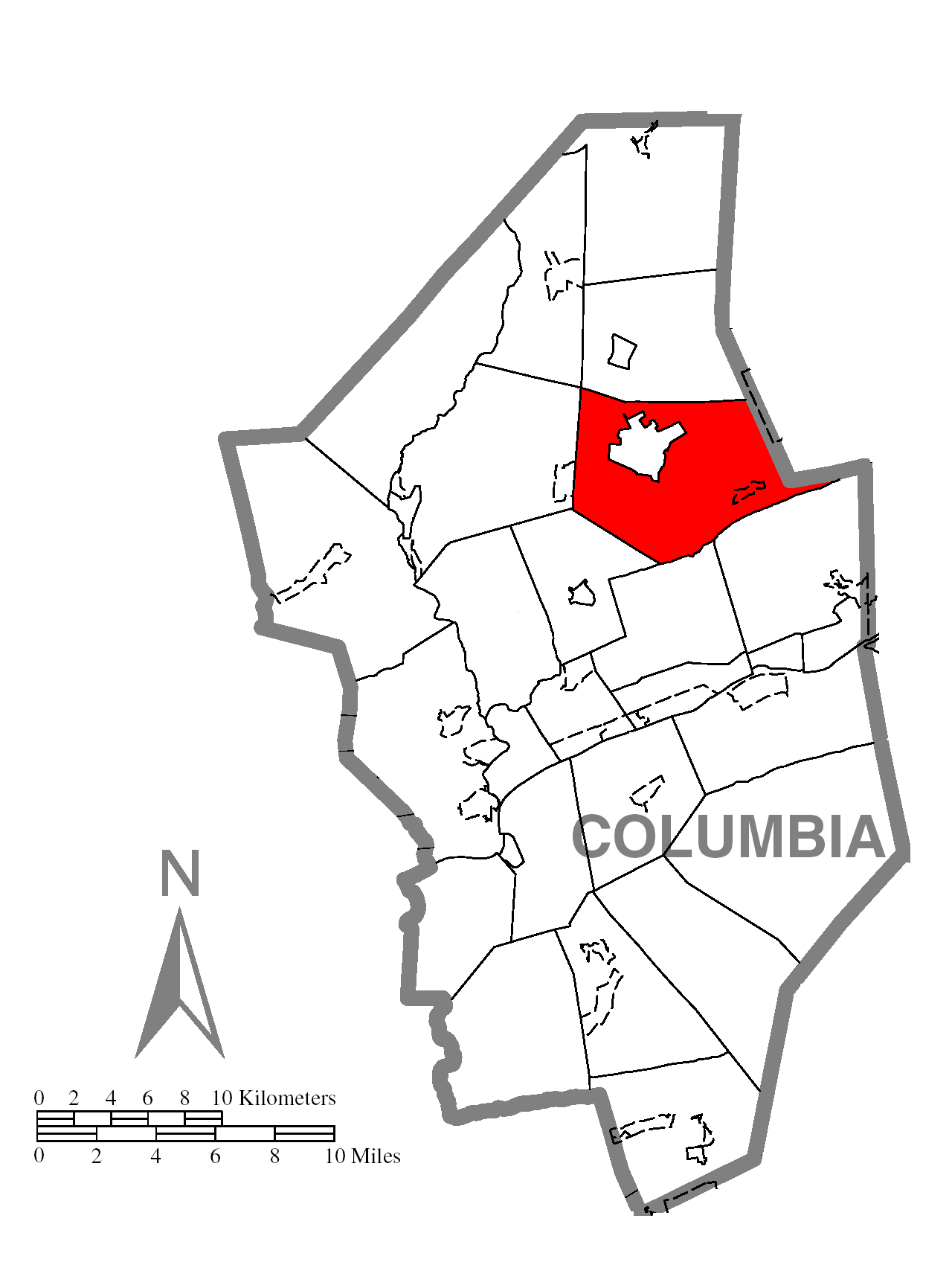
- Location of Fishing Creek Township in Columbia County

- Location of Columbia County in Pennsylvania
- Country: United States
- State: Pennsylvania
- County: Columbia
- Settled: 1783
- Incorporated: 1789

Area
  - Total: 28.73 sq mi (74.41 km^{2})
  - Land: 28.43 sq mi (73.63 km^{2})
  - Water: 0.31 sq mi (0.79 km^{2})

Population (2020)
  - Total: 1,527 ▲
  - Estimate (2021): 1,536
  - Density: 49.6/sq mi (19.16/km^{2})
- Time zone: UTC-5 (Eastern (EST))
  - Summer (DST): UTC-4 (EDT)
- Area code: 570
- FIPS code: 42-037-26056
- Website: fishingcreektownship.org

Fishing Creek Township is a township in Columbia County, Pennsylvania. It is part of Northeastern Pennsylvania. The population was 1,416 at the 2010 census.

== History ==
The Josiah Hess Covered Bridge No. 122, Twin Bridges-East Paden Covered Bridge No. 120, and Twin Bridges-West Paden Covered Bridge No. 121 were listed on the National Register of Historic Places in 1979. The Bridge in Fishing Creek Township was listed in 1988.

== Geography ==
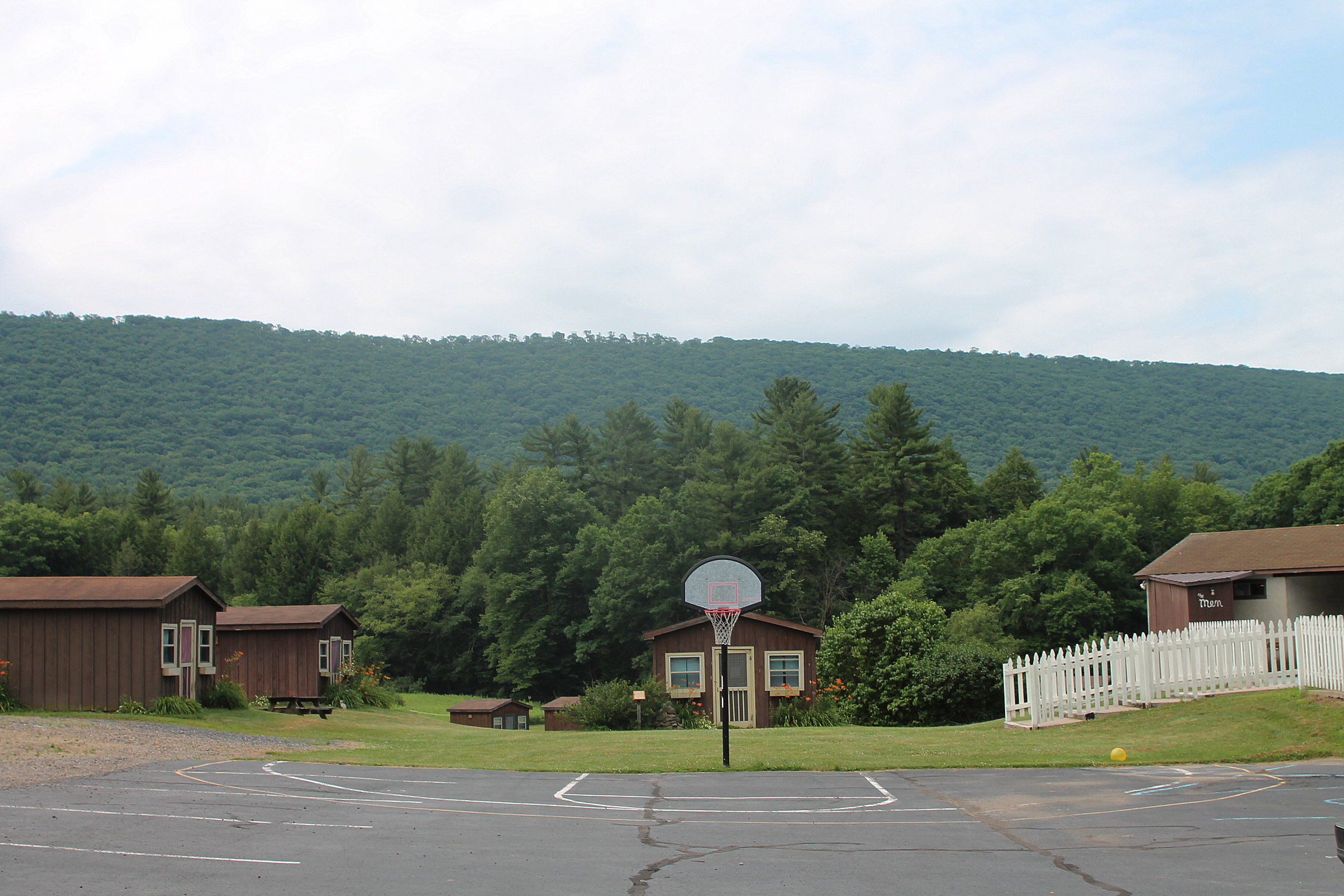
Scenery of eastern Fishing Creek Township

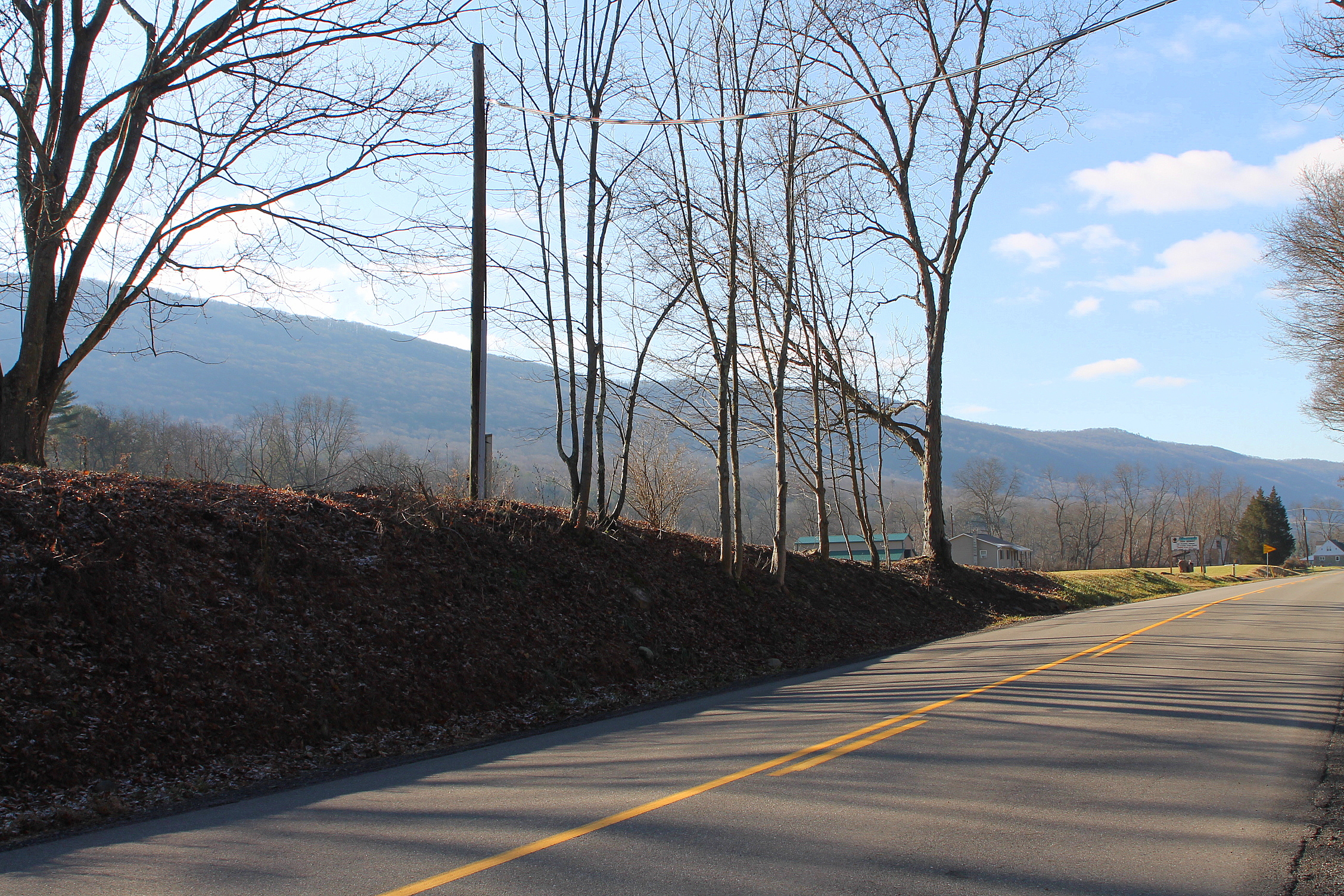
Fishing Creek Township as seen from Winding Road

Fishing Creek Township is in northeastern Columbia County, bordered to the east by Luzerne County. The connected ridges of Huntington Mountain and Knob Mountain form the southern boundary. The township surrounds the borough of Stillwater, a separate municipality. The unincorporated communities of Honeytown, Van Camp, Bendertown, Zaner, Pealertown, Forks, Asbury, and Jonestown are in the township.

According to the United States Census Bureau, the township has a total area of 28.7 square miles (74.4 km^{2}), of which 28.4 square miles (73.6 km^{2}) is land and 0.3 square miles (0.8 km^{2}), or 1.06%, is water. Major streams in the township are Fishing Creek and Huntington Creek, its tributary. Fishing Creek flows south to the Susquehanna River at Bloomsburg.

== Demographics ==
Historical population
Census	Pop.	Note	%±
2010	1,416		—
2020	1,527		7.8%
2021 (est.)	1,536		0.6%
U.S. Decennial Census

As of the census of 2000, there were 1,393 people, 556 households, and 425 families residing in the township. The population density was 48.8 inhabitants per square mile (18.8/km^{2}). There were 711 housing units at an average density of 24.9 units per square mile (9.6 units/km^{2}). The racial makeup of the township was 99.21% White, 0.14% Asian, 0.14% from other races, and 0.50% from two or more races. Hispanic or Latino of any race were 0.79% of the population.

There were 556 households, out of which 29.0% had children under the age of 18 living with them, 66.4% were married couples living together, 7.0% had a female householder with no husband present, and 23.4% were non-families. 20.1% of all households were made up of individuals, and 8.5% had someone living alone who was 65 years of age or older. The average household size was 2.51 and the average family size was 2.88.

In the township the population was spread out, with 22.3% under the age of 18, 6.2% from 18 to 24, 29.4% from 25 to 44, 27.8% from 45 to 64, and 14.4% who were 65 years of age or older. The median age was 41 years. For every 100 females, there were 99.3 males. For every 100 females age 18 and over, there were 96.6 males.

The median income for a household in the township was $38,654, and the median income for a family was $44,118. Males had a median income of $30,114 versus $23,580 for females. The per capita income for the township was $18,121. About 6.6% of families and 7.5% of the population were below the poverty line, including 10.1% of those under age 18 and 10.4% of those age 65 or over.

== Notable person ==
- Charles Rollin Buckalew (1821–1899), politician
