= Jonestown, Columbia County, Pennsylvania =

Unincorporated community in Pennsylvania, US

- Census-designated place
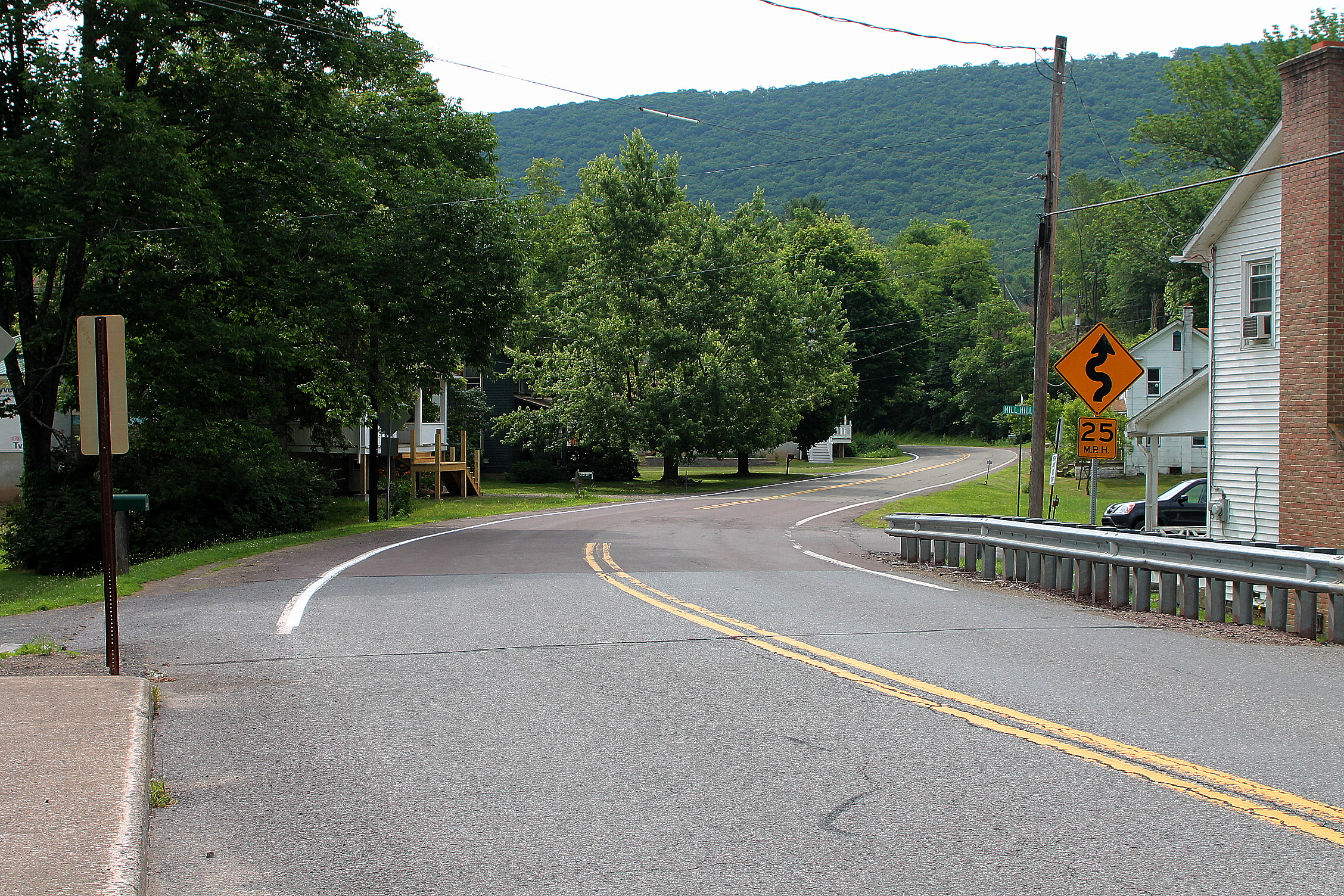
- Ridge Road in Jonestown

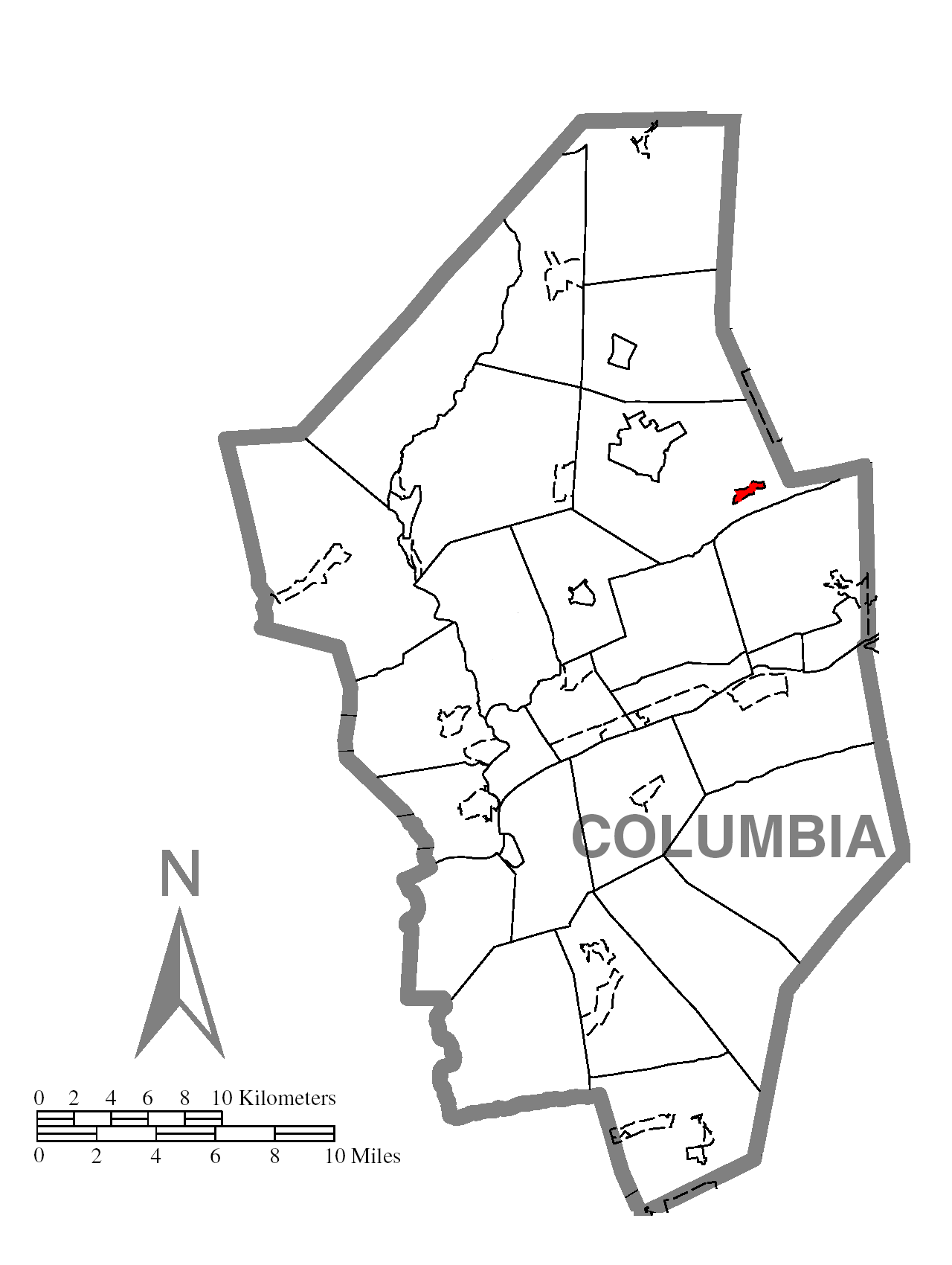
- Location within Columbia County

- Location within the state of Pennsylvania Jonestown (the United States)
- Coordinates: 41°7′43″N 76°18′12″W
- Country: United States
- State: Pennsylvania
- County: Columbia
- Township: Fishing Creek

Area
  - Total: 0.39 sq mi (1.00 km^{2})
  - Land: 0.37 sq mi (0.95 km^{2})
  - Water: 0.023 sq mi (0.06 km^{2})
- Elevation: 696 ft (212 m)

Population (2020)
  - Total: 115
  - Density: 313.6/sq mi (121.08/km^{2})
- Time zone: UTC-5 (Eastern (EST))
  - Summer (DST): UTC-4 (EDT)
- FIPS code: 42-38392
- GNIS feature ID: 1178161

Jonestown is a census-designated place (CDP) in Columbia County, Pennsylvania, United States. It is part of Northeastern Pennsylvania. The population was 115 at the 2020 census. It is part of the Bloomsburg-Berwick micropolitan area.

== History ==
Jonestown was established by Benjamin Jones in 1809, when he built a sawmill in the community, followed by a gristmill in 1811. The gristmill was used until 1968. A path between Wilkes-Barre and Muncy once passed through Jonestown.

Historically, the Susquehanna and Tioga Turnpike passed through Jonestown. As of 1915, there was a hotel in Jonestown.

== Geography ==
Jonestown is located in northeastern Columbia County at 41°7′36″N 76°18′9″W (41.126639, -76.302364), at the foot of the north side of Huntington Mountain (also known as Knob Mountain). It is in southeastern Fishing Creek Township, on both sides of Huntington Creek, which runs southwest along the foot of Knob Mountain to join Fishing Creek, which in turn flows to the Susquehanna River.

According to the United States Census Bureau, the Jonestown CDP has a total area of 0.4 square miles (1.0 km^{2}), of which 0.37 square miles (0.95 km^{2}) is land and 0.02 square miles (0.06 km^{2}), or 5.49%, is water.

== Demographics ==
Historical population
Census	Pop.	Note	%±
2020	115		—
U.S. Decennial Census

As of the census of 2010, there were 64 people, 28 households, and 19 families residing in the CDP. The population density was 213.3 inhabitants per square mile (82.4/km^{2}). There were 36 housing units at an average density of 120 per square mile (46/km^{2}). The racial makeup of the CDP was 100.00% White.

There were 28 households, out of which 17.9% had children under the age of 18 living with them, 60.7% were married couples living together, 7.1% had a female householder with no husband present, and 32.1% were non-families. 21.4% of all households were made up of individuals, and 14.3% had someone living alone who was 65 years of age or older. The average household size was 2.29 and the average family size was 2.74.

In the CDP, the population was spread out, with 18.7% age 19 and under, 1.6% from 20 to 24, 31.3% from 25 to 44, 36.1% from 45 to 64, and 12.5% who were 65 years of age or older. The median age was 44.7 years. For every 100 females, there were 78.9 males. The population was composed of 44.8% males and 56.3% females.

The median income for a household in the CDP was $32,500, and the median income for a family was $42,143. The per capita income for the CDP was $7,878. There were no families and 4.2% of the population living below the poverty line, including no under eighteens and 0.0% of those over 64.

== Education ==
The school district is Benton Area School District. The district's schools are L.R. Appleman Elementary School and Benton Middle-Senior High School.
