= Huntington Creek (Pennsylvania) =

Creek in Pennsylvania, US

Coordinates: 41°06′17″N 76°21′40″W

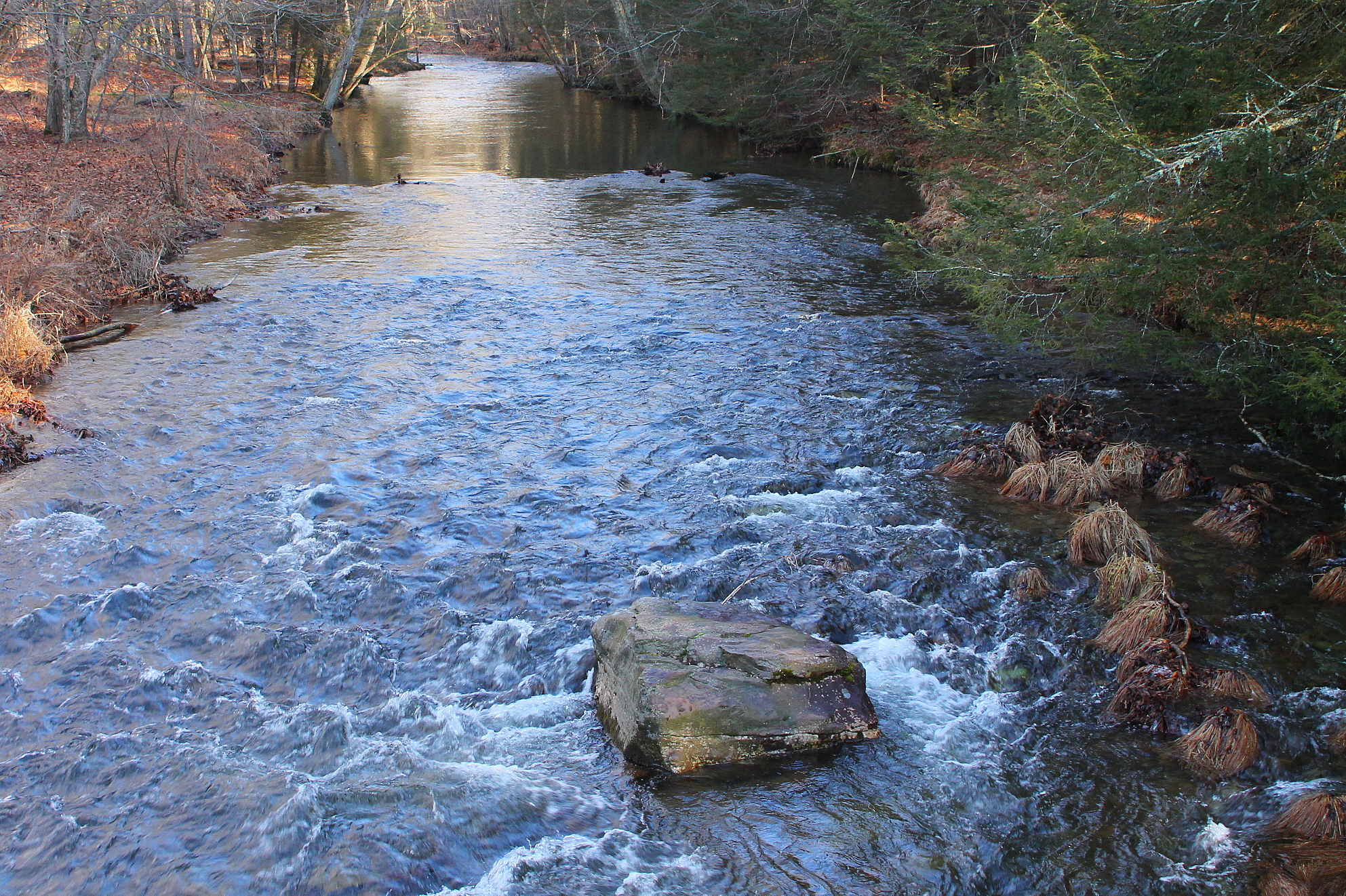
Huntington Creek in its upper reaches

Huntington Creek is a tributary of Fishing Creek (North Branch Susquehanna River) in Luzerne and Columbia counties, Pennsylvania, in the United States. It is approximately 29.5 miles (47.5 km) long.

== Course ==
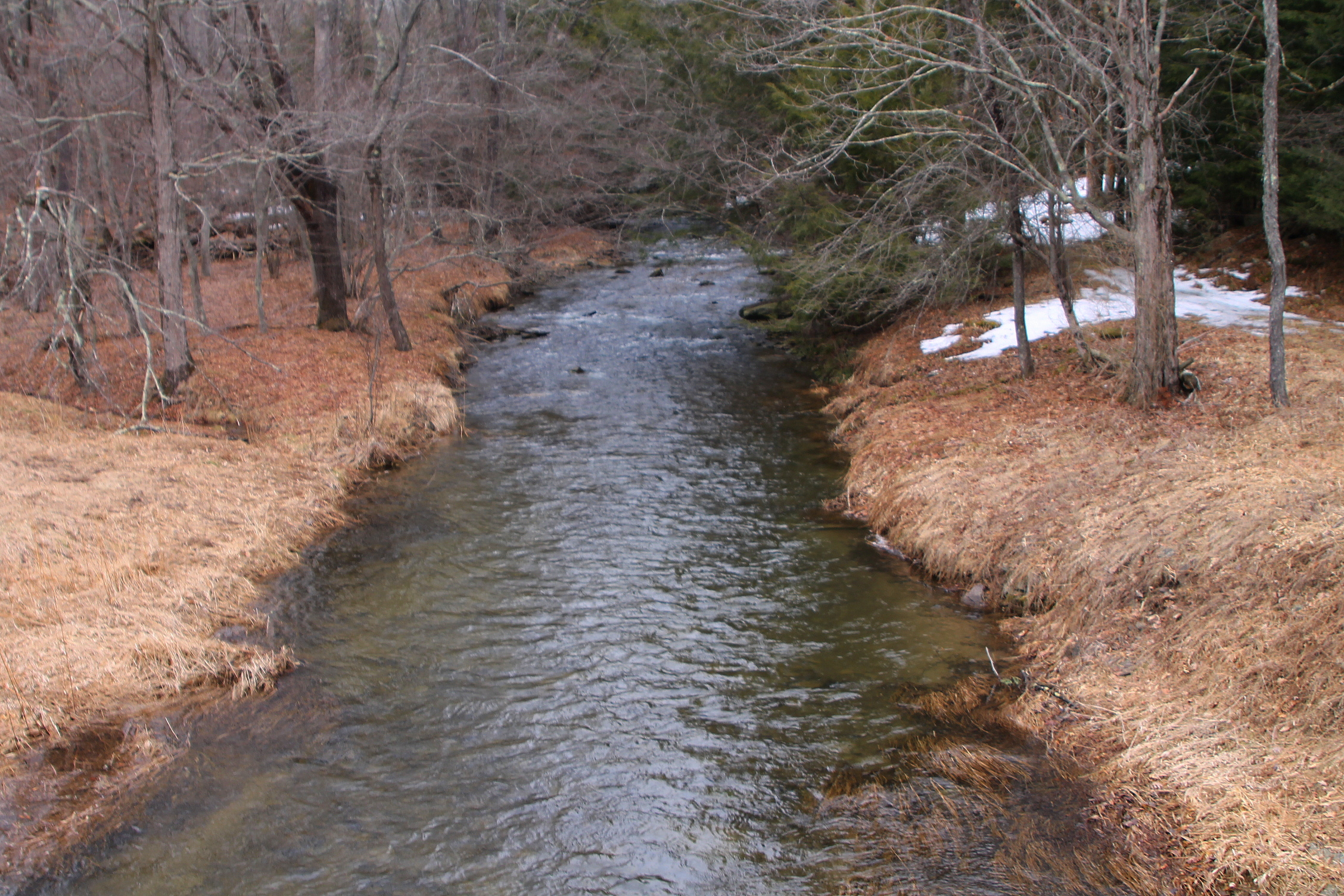
Huntington Creek in Ross Township, Luzerne County

Huntington Creek begins in Lake Township, Luzerne County, flows west-southwest for over a mile, then enters Ross Township. Here the creek turns south for approximately two miles as its valley widens. It presently turns west and crosses Pennsylvania Route 118, on the other side of which the creek turns southwest and receives its first named tributary, Mitchler Run. A short distance downstream, Huntington Creek receives its second tributary, Laurel Run. The creek then makes a sharp turn south, picking up the tributary Shingle Run, then makes a sharp turn west and receives the tributary Arnold Creek. As Huntington Creek continues west its valley deepens and broadens and it receives Lick Branch. The creek then enters Fairmount Township, passes by Jackson Hill, receives Phillips Creek and then turns south for several miles; its valley becomes far broader. The creek then enters Huntington Township, where it picks up the tributary Kitchen Creek and continues south past the community of Harveyville, where its valley narrows. The creek then turns southeast for a few miles, picking up the tributary Rogers Creek, passing Huntington Mills, and crossing Pennsylvania Route 239. Over the next several miles, the creek turns west and flows parallel to Huntington Mountain. A few miles later it picks up Kingsbury Brook and leaves Luzerne County.

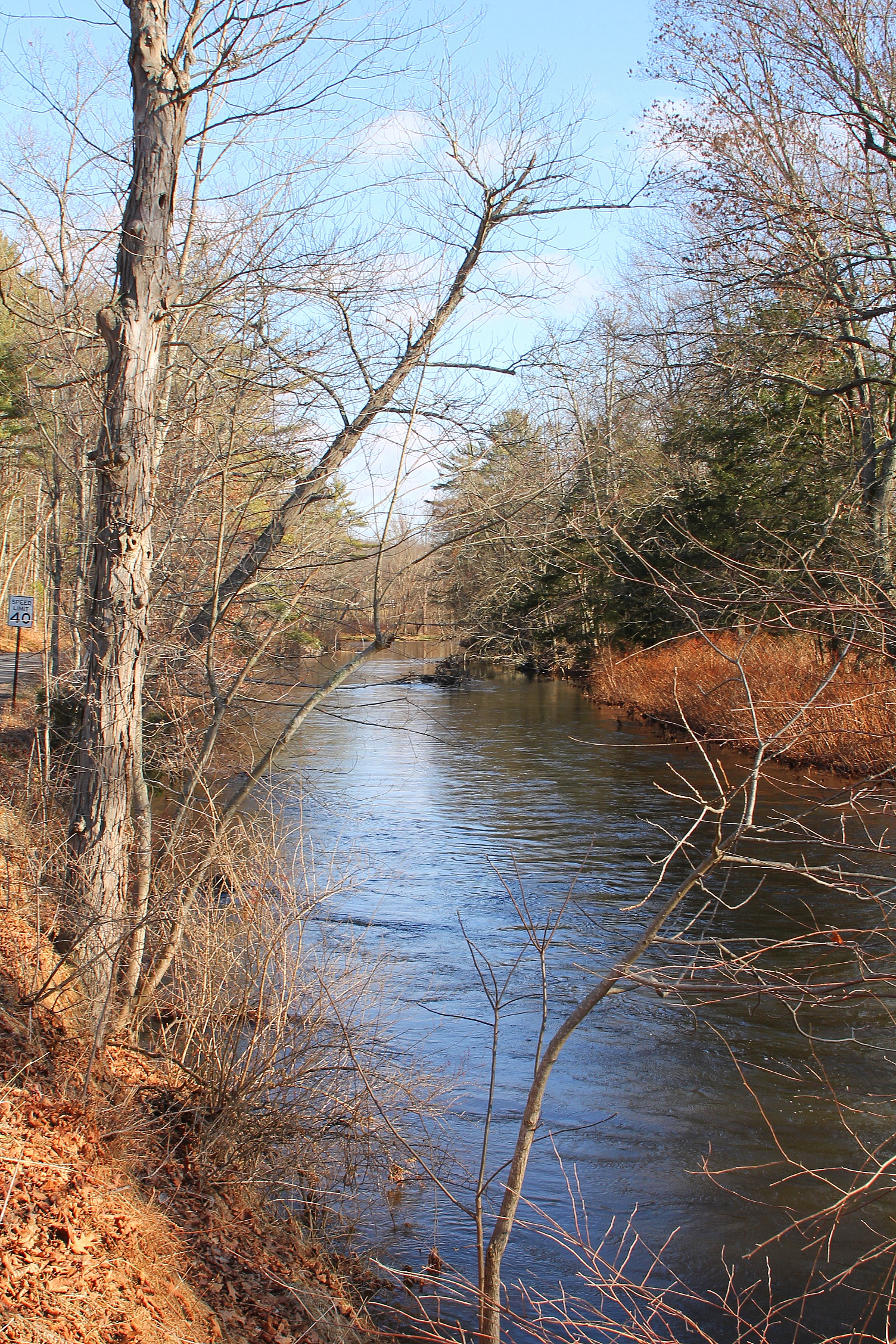
Huntington Creek looking upstream in Fishing Creek Township, Columbia County

Upon leaving Luzerne County, Huntington Creek enters Fishing Creek Township, Columbia County. Approximately a mile downstream, the creek passes through Jonestown, where it receives Pine Creek, its last named tributary. After flowing parallel to Huntington Mountain and Knob Mountain for a few miles, it reaches its confluence with Fishing Creek near the community of Forks.

Huntington Creek joins Fishing Creek 15.10 miles (24.30 km) upstream of its mouth.

=== Tributaries ===
Major tributaries of Huntington Creek include Kitchen Creek and Pine Creek. Kitchen Creek joins Huntington Creek 16.02 miles (25.78 km) upstream of its mouth; its watershed has an area of 20.10 square miles (52.1 km^{2}). Pine Creek joins Huntington Creek 4.26 miles (6.86 km) upstream of its mouth. Its watershed has an area of 30.7 square miles (80 km^{2}).

== Hydrology ==
The waters of Huntington Creek increase the size of Fishing Creek by a factor of two.

The average annual rate of precipitation in the watershed of Huntington Creek ranges between 35 inches (89 cm) and 45 inches (110 cm).

== Geography and geology ==
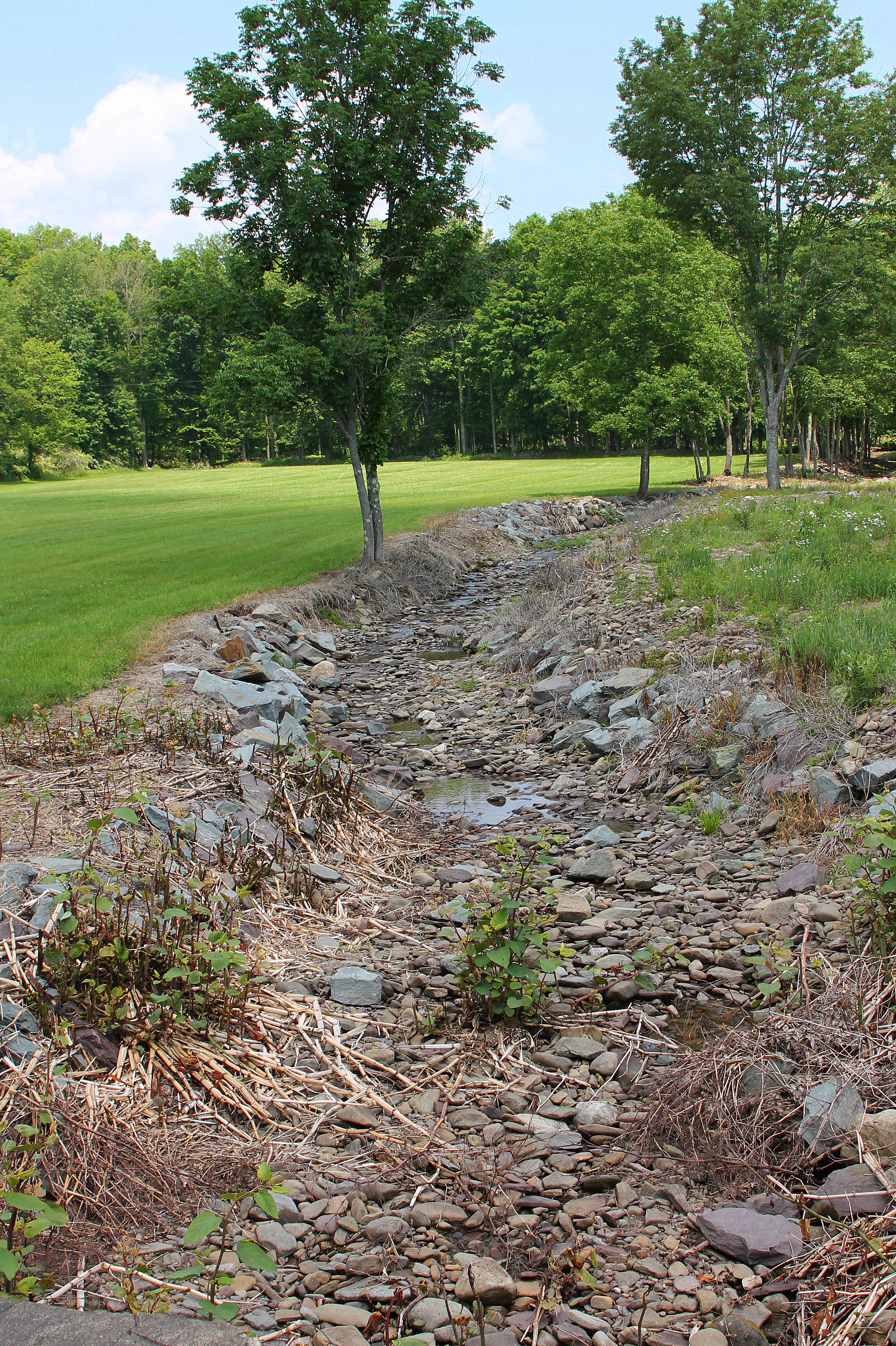
Huntington Creek looking upstream in its upper reaches

The elevation near the mouth of Huntington Creek is 620 feet (190 m) above sea level. The elevation of the creek's source is between 1,620 feet (490 m) and 1,640 feet (500 m) above sea level. Upstream of Kitchen Creek, its elevation decreases by 50.9 feet (15.5 m) per mile. Between Kitchen Creek and Pine Creek, the elevation decreases by 13.2 feet (4.0 m) per mile. Between Pine Creek and the mouth, the elevation decreases by 18.9 feet (5.8 m) per mile.

The headwaters of Huntington Creek are on North Mountain. The watershed is also crossed by a terminal moraine.

The channel of Huntington Creek flows through rock formations of shale and sandstone.

The channel of Huntington Creek braids and splits in places. There are also strainers and deadfalls on the creek. Its channel is sinuous. The creek also has alluvial floodplains nearby. Lakes and swamps created by glaciers are found in the upper reaches of the watershed. Parts of the creek, especially in its lower reaches, have wide bottom lands.

== Watershed ==
The watershed of Huntington Creek has an area of 114.00 square miles (295.3 km^{2}). The watershed is situated in parts of three counties: Columbia County, Luzerne County, and Sullivan County.

Huntington Creek is mostly surrounded by farms, pine-covered hills, and Huntington Mountain, although there are several villages and a few summer homes on the creek near Jonestown. The area in the vicinity of the creek is sparsely inhabited and "rugged", with a 1921 book describing the watershed as "broken, mountainous country". There are no major highways near the creek.

There are three dams on Huntington Creek. The largest is a dam above Jonestown, which is 6 feet (1.8 m) high. A dam that is 3 feet (0.91 m) high is located 0.5 miles (0.80 km) downstream of Huntington Mills. The smallest dam on the creek is in Huntington Mills. This dam is 2 feet (0.61 m) high.

== History and industries ==
In the early 1900s, industries in the watershed of Huntington Creek included paper mills and agriculture. The creek powered a paper mill as well as a number of small gristmills.

Among the numerous communities in the Huntington Creek watershed in 1921, the largest were Harveyville, with 230 people; Huntington Mills, 229; Cambria, 213; Fishing Creek, 205; New Columbus, 175; and Register, with 150 people.

Many bridges cross Huntington Creek, some of which are covered bridges. In Columbia County a pair of twin covered bridges which cross the creek are named Twin Bridges-West Paden Covered Bridge No. 121 and Twin Bridges-East Paden Covered Bridge No. 120. Built in 1850 and repaired in 1884 by W. C. Pennington, they were the last remaining twin covered bridges in Pennsylvania until a flood washed away the West Paden Bridge on June 28, 2006. The West Paden Bridge was rebuilt in 2008. The Josiah Hess Covered Bridge No. 122, which also crosses the creek in Columbia County, was built in 1875 by Joseph Redline and W. J. Manning.

Two bridges historically crossed Huntington Creek in Luzerne County: the Bittenbender Covered Bridge and the Huntington Mills Covered Bridge. The former was destroyed in the flood of June 28, 2006 and the latter was destroyed on an unknown date.

In addition to covered bridges, a number of other bridges cross Huntington Creek. Two were built across the creek in Luzerne County in 1890 and 1891, followed by two more in 1910. Two more bridges were built in 1969 and 1970, followed by one in 1985 and one in 1994. Three bridges were built across the creek in Luzerne County in 2000 and 2001. The newest bridge across the creek in that county was built in 2007. The oldest bridges are metal truss bridges, while the newer are prestressed box beam bridges. Additionally, three bridges were built over the creek in Columbia County in 1959 and 1961.

== Biology ==
Fish species such as the eastern mudminnow inhabit Huntington Creek.

Huntington Creek is listed as a Natural Heritage Area on the Luzerne County Natural Areas Inventory. The creek is also designated as a high-quality coldwater fishery.

== Recreation ==
Edward Gertler states in his book Keystone Canoeing that Huntington Creek is ideal for novice canoers. It is possible to canoe on the creek during snowmelts or within several days of heavy rain. Gertler describes the creek's scenery as "good". A total of 17.1 miles (27.5 km) of the creek are possible for canoeing.

Kitchen Creek, a tributary of Huntington Creek flows through Ricketts Glen State Park.

== See also ==
- Green Creek (Fishing Creek)
- List of tributaries of Fishing Creek (North Branch Susquehanna River)
