= Knob Mountain (Pennsylvania) =

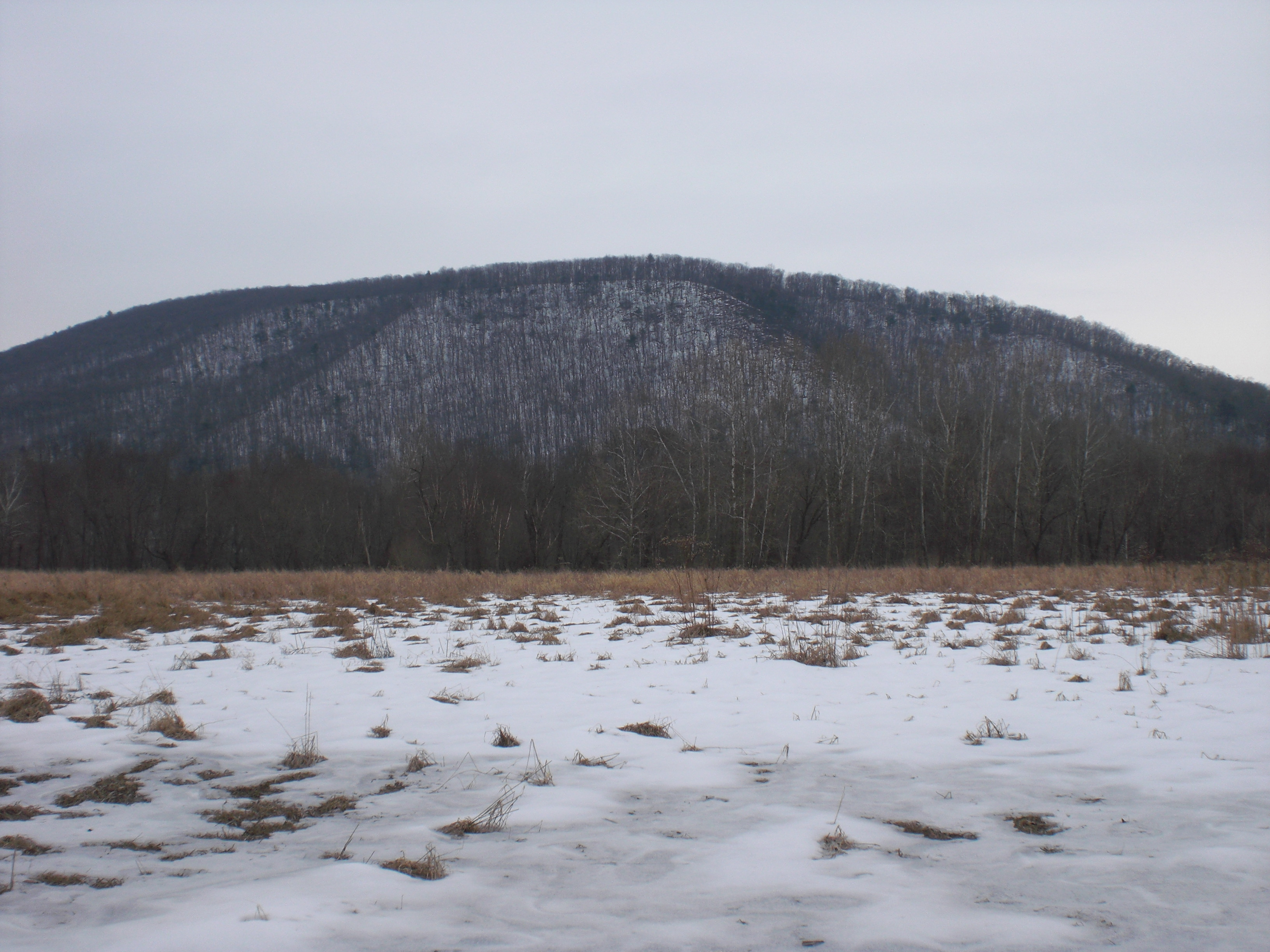
- Knob Mountain from the west

Highest point
- Elevation: 1,720 ft (520 m)
- Listing: Lee Mountain, Huntington Mountain
- Coordinates: 41°5′44″N 76°20′46″W

Geography
- Location within Pennsylvania
- Parent range: Appalachians

Climbing
- Easiest route: Road

Knob Mountain (also known as Nob Mountain) is a ridge in the northeastern part of Columbia County, Pennsylvania and parts of Luzerne County, Pennsylvania. Its elevation is over 1720 feet above sea level. Knob Mountain can be seen from a considerable distance, and is also visible from Bloomsburg. The peak of the mountain is one of the highest points in Columbia County.

== Geology and geography ==
Knob Mountain's western terminus is near Orangeville. The mountain runs eastward and slightly northward for ten or twelve miles (16 or 20 kilometers) before descending to the level of the surrounding land, slightly over the Luzerne County line. However, it has a slightly lower subsidiary peak known as Huntington Mountain that extends in approximately the same direction as the main mountain as far as Shickshinny.

Knob Mountain is a fairly steep mountain. It is more steep on its northern side than it is on its southern side. Its base is in the watersheds of Fishing Creek and Huntington Creek. At one point, Fishing Creek makes a sharp curve around the base of Knob Mountain. The outline of the mountain is fairly uniform. However, there is a notch near the eastern terminus of Knob Mountain.

A terminal moraine runs from the nearby Lee Mountain to the southern base of Knob Mountain and then over Knob Mountain to Fishing Creek. The mountain has coarse, hard sandstone near its peak and is situated in the Wyoming coal basin. This coal basin is part of a chain of coal-containing areas that runs between Lackawanna County and Dauphin County. The Wyoming and Lackawanna coal field terminates at Knob Mountain. There is also a red shale basin under the mountain.

Lee Mountain and Huntington Mountain are mountains that are near to Knob Mountain, and they can be considered eastward extensions of Knob Mountain.

== Climbing ==
Knob Mountain can be approached from any direction. Two roads cross over the main part of the mountain. The highest point on the whole ridge is over 1720 feet.

== History ==
The area in the vicinity of Fishing Creek and Knob Mountain was first settled in 1780. However, it was not until 1785 that large numbers of people traveled to the area around Knob Mountain. The settlers that arrived in this year primarily traveled from New Jersey to the mouth of Fishing Creek via Berwick and from the mouth of Fishing Creek up the creek's valley to near Knob Mountain. Such settlement was, at the time, the northernmost non-native settlement in the Fishing Creek watershed. A community at the base of the mountain was built in 1822. An Indian path once passed over the mountain near its eastern terminus. The Susquehanna and Tioga Turnpike once crossed over Knob Mountain. A township border was once determined to be a heap of stones on the top of Knob Mountain.

== Fauna and flora ==
Knob Mountain has forests at its peak. It is surrounded by agricultural communities. In the early days of civilization in the area around Knob Mountain, the mountain was commonly believed to be home to numerous wolves and bears.

== See also ==
- Catawissa Mountain
- North Mountain (Pennsylvania)
