= Josiah Hess Covered Bridge No. 122 =

- U.S. National Register of Historic Places
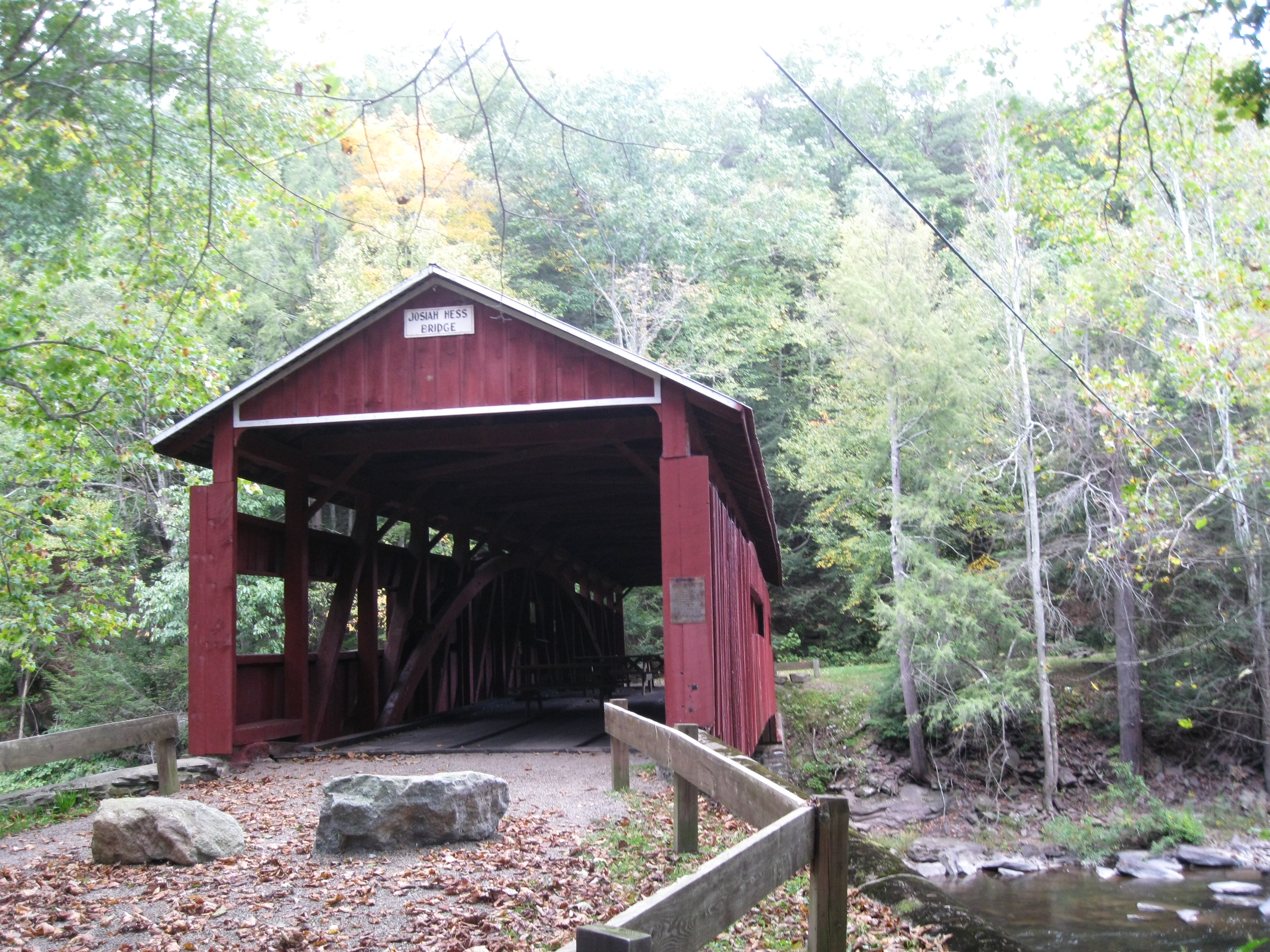
- The bridge in September 2012

- Location within Pennsylvania Location within the United States
- Location: Pennsylvania Route 563, east of Forks, Fishing Creek Township, Pennsylvania
- Coordinates: 41°6′53″N 76°20′23″W
- Area: 0.1 acres (0.040 ha)
- Built: 1875
- Built by: Joseph Redline
- Architectural style: Burr Truss-Arch
- MPS: Covered Bridges of Columbia and Montour Counties TR
- NRHP reference No.: 79003181
- Added to NRHP: November 29, 1979

The Josiah Hess Covered Bridge No. 122 is a historic wooden covered bridge over Huntington Creek in Fishing Creek Township in Columbia County, Pennsylvania. It is a 105.1-foot-long (32.0 m), Burr Truss arch bridge constructed in 1875. It is one of 28 historic covered bridges in Columbia and Montour Counties.

It was listed on the National Register of Historic Places in 1979.
