= Twin Bridges-East Paden Covered Bridge No. 120 =

- U.S. National Register of Historic Places
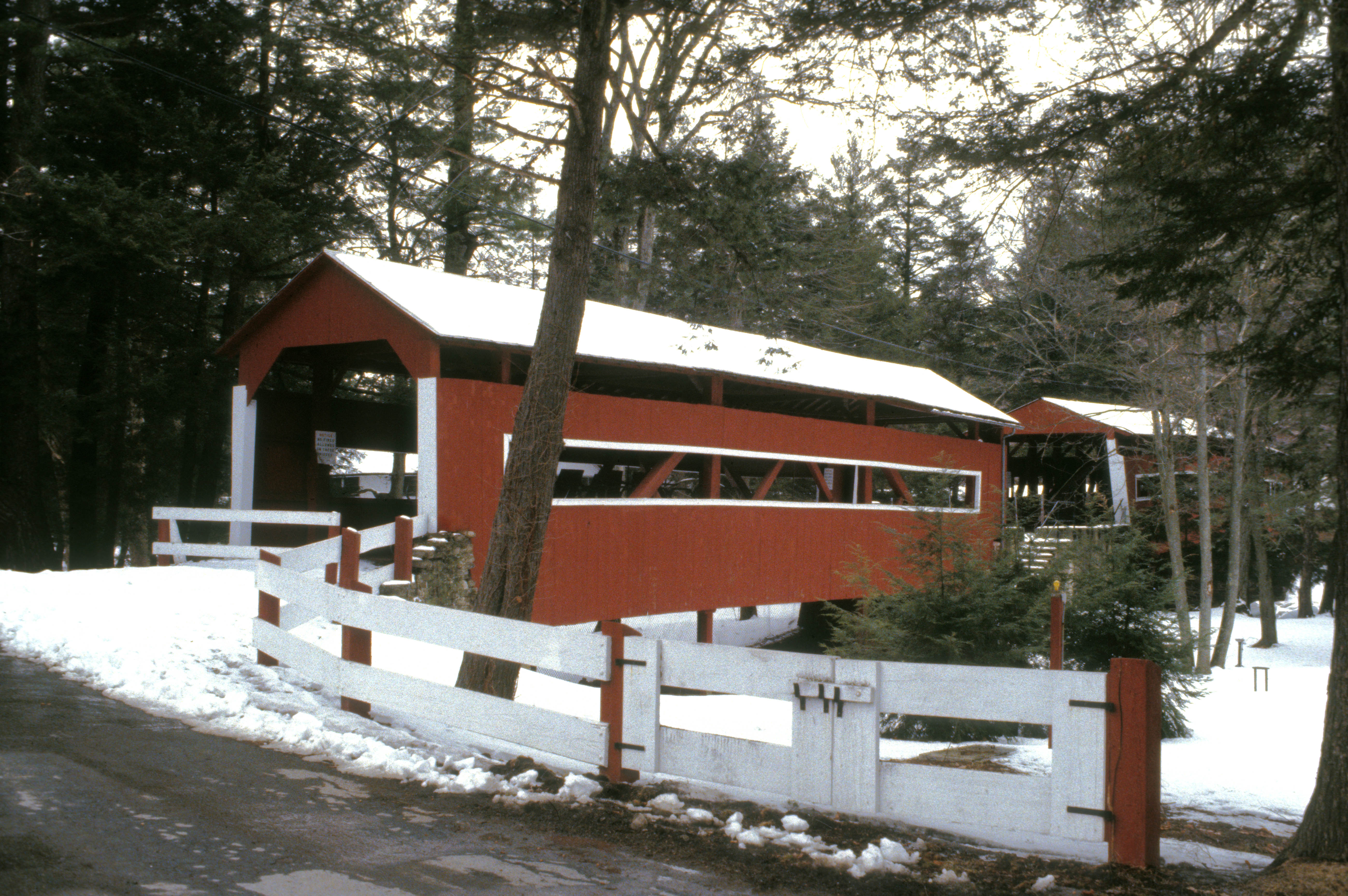
- East Paden Covered Bridge (with its western twin) in 1982

- Location within Pennsylvania Location within the United States
- Location: Pennsylvania Route 371, south of Catawissa, Fishing Creek Township, Pennsylvania
- Coordinates: 41°6′25″N 76°21′25″W
- Area: 0.1 acres (0.040 ha)
- Built: 1850; 176 years ago
- Architect: Peter Ent
- Architectural style: Queen Post
- MPS: Covered Bridges of Columbia and Montour Counties TR
- NRHP reference No.: 79003180
- Added to NRHP: November 29, 1979

The Twin Bridges-East Paden Covered Bridge No. 120 is an historic, wooden, covered bridge in Fishing Creek Township in Columbia County, Pennsylvania, United States.

It was listed on the National Register of Historic Places in 1979.

== History and architectural features ==
This historic structure is a 75-foot-long (23 m), Burr Truss bridge, with a sheet metal roof. Erected in 1850, it crosses the Huntington Creek and is one of twenty-eight historic covered bridges that are located in Columbia and Montour Counties. It is a twin of the Twin Bridges-West Paden Covered Bridge No. 121.

It was listed on the National Register of Historic Places in 1979.
