= Hemlock Creek (Fishing Creek tributary) =

Stream in Pennsylvania, U.S.

Coordinates: 40°59′42″N 76°28′27″W

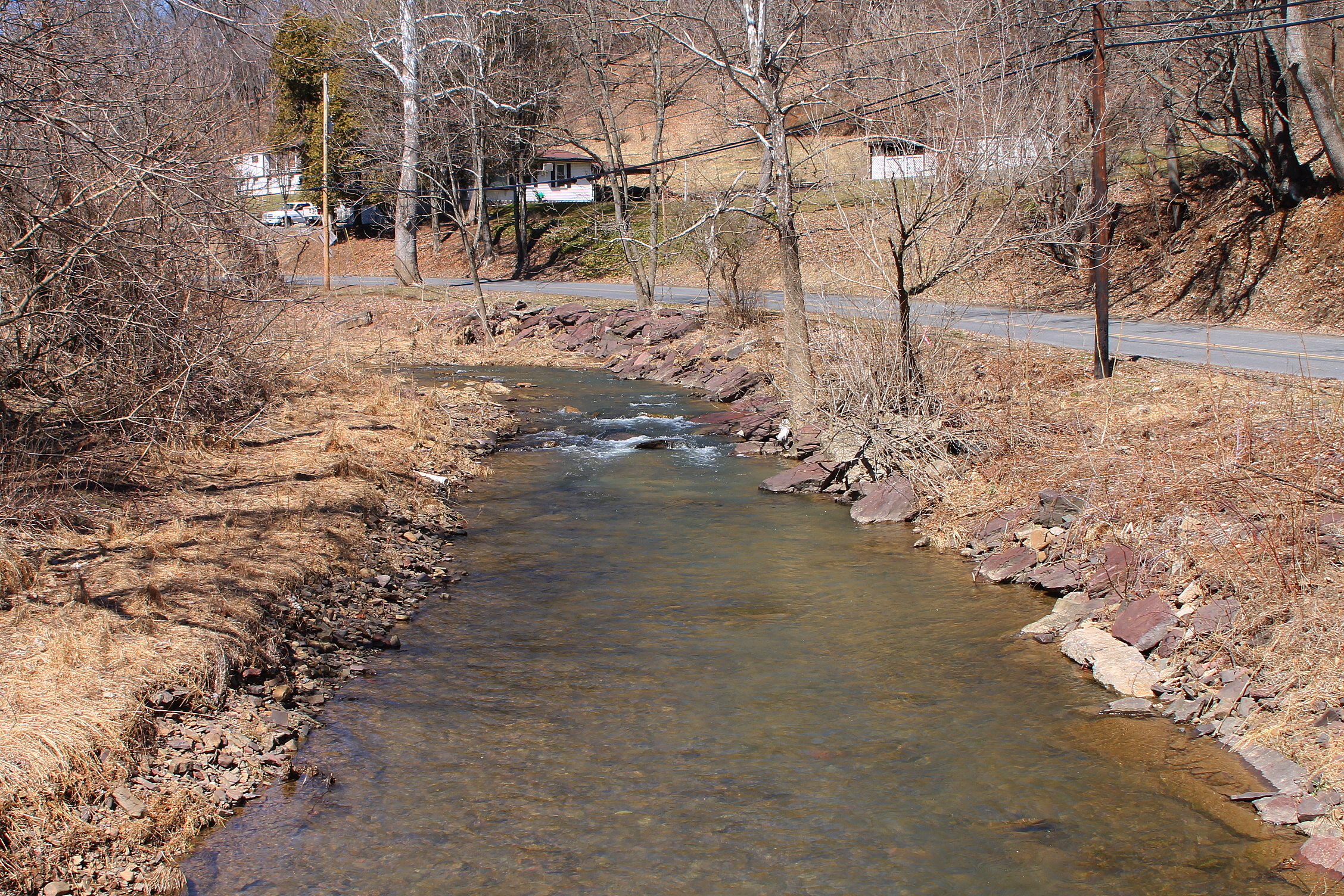
Hemlock Creek looking downstream

Hemlock Creek is a stream in Columbia County, Pennsylvania, in the United States. It is 7.6 miles (12.2 km) in length. The stream is a tributary of Fishing Creek. It is primarily in Madison and Hemlock Townships. Its named tributaries are West Hemlock Creek and Frozen Run. Hemlock Creek flows through Montour Ridge. Industries in the vicinity of Hemlock Creek have largely consisted of mills and iron mines. The creek's watershed is in Columbia and Montour Counties and is 16 square miles (41 km^{2}) in area.

== Course ==
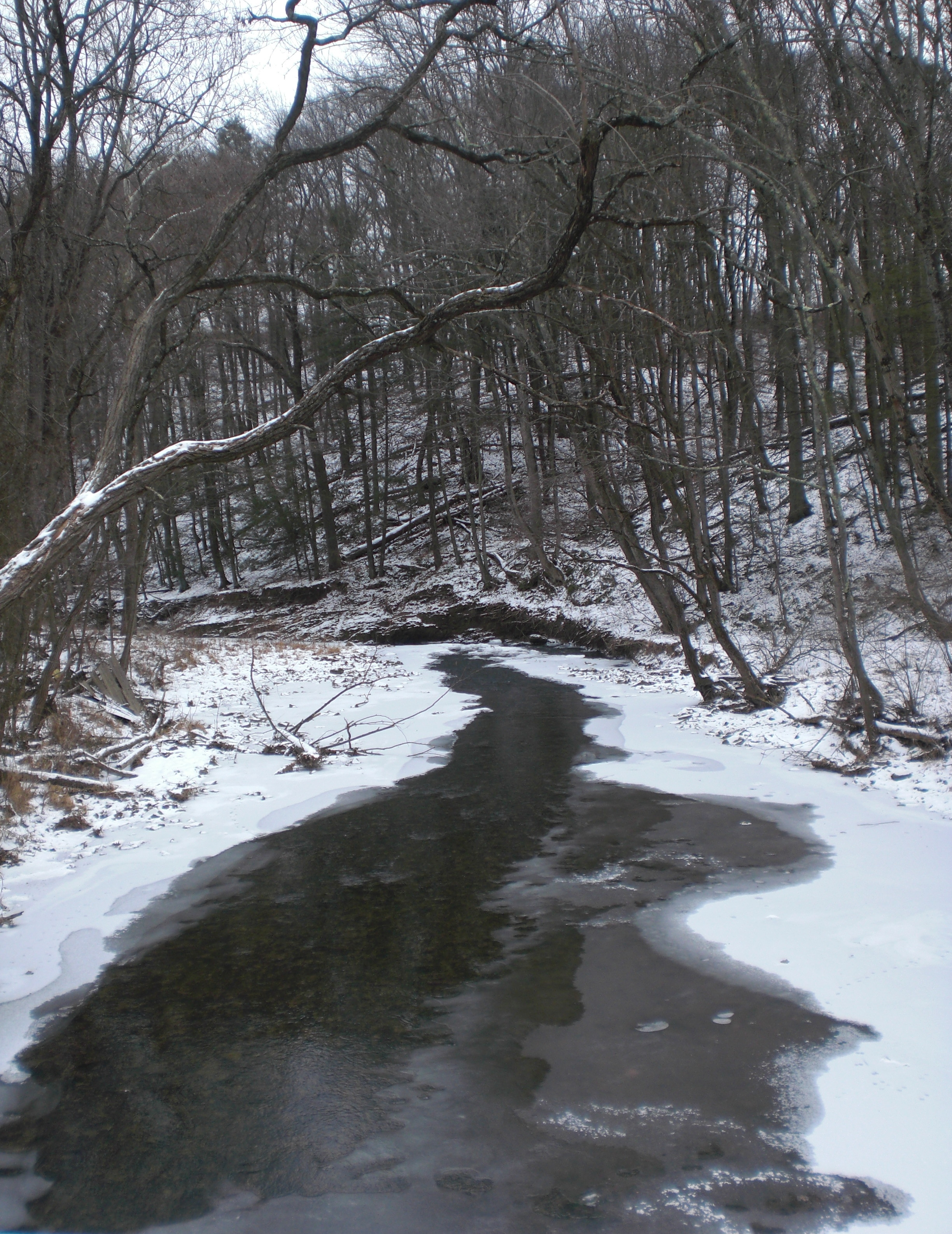
Hemlock Creek looking downstream

Hemlock Creek starts in Madison Township, a few miles north of the community of Columbia Hill. The creek flows southeast, paralleling Pennsylvania Route 44. After several miles, it goes into Hemlock Township. It continues to parallel Pennsylvania Route 44 as it picks up its first tributary, West Hemlock Creek, and flows into Buckhorn. It then flows southwest past Frosty Valley, where it picks up its second tributary, Frozen Run. The creek then heads southeast into Fernville, where it empties into Fishing Creek.

=== Tributaries ===
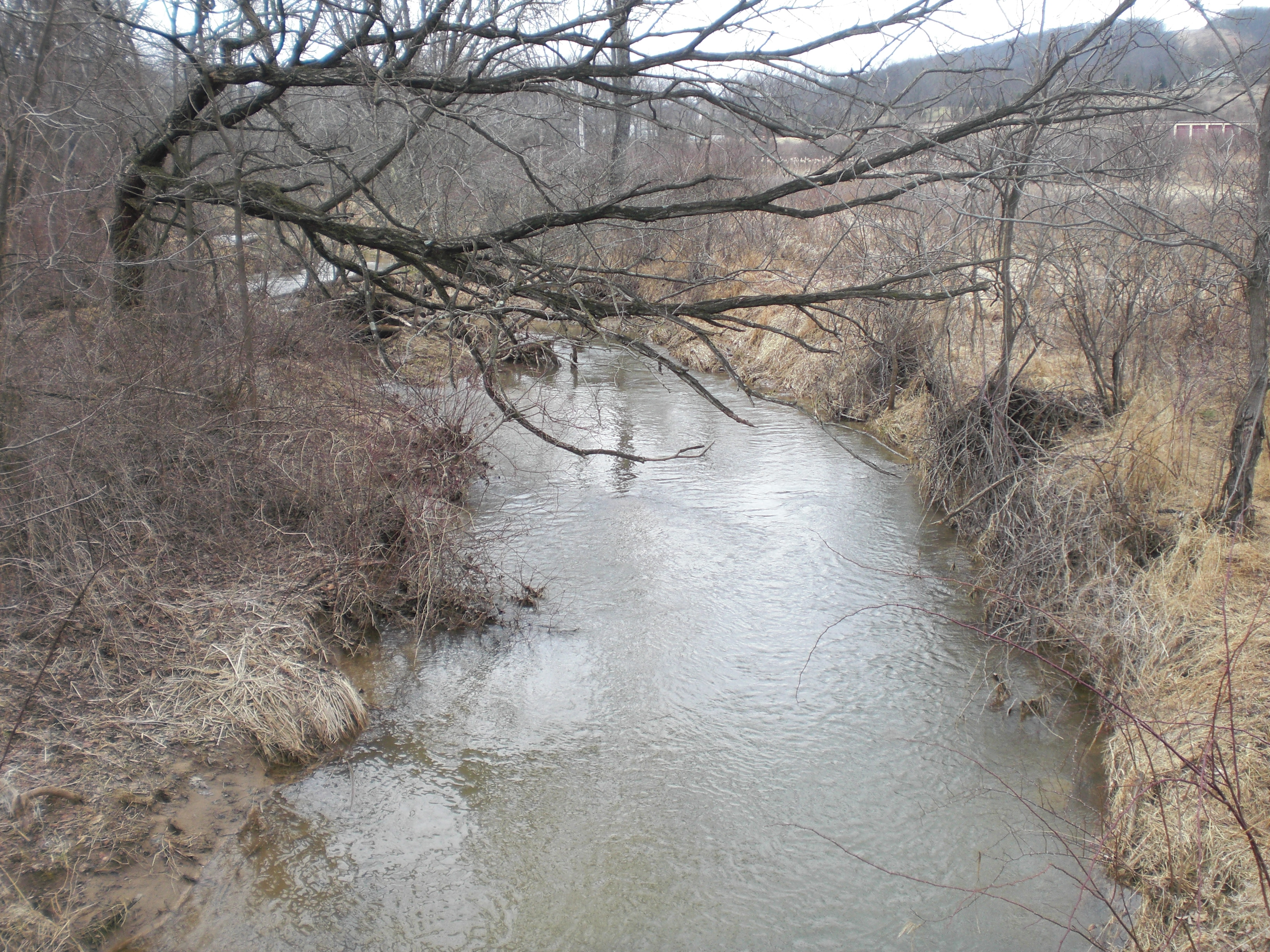
Frozen Run, a tributary of Hemlock Creek

Hemlock Creek's main tributaries are West Hemlock Creek and Frozen Run. West Hemlock Creek also has several unnamed tributaries. Frozen Run starts in western Hemlock Township and flows eastward through Frosty Valley to join Hemlock Creek in Buckhorn. West Hemlock Creek also starts in western Hemlock Township and joins the main stem in Buckhorn.

== Hydrology ==
The eight year average annual rainfall is 37.7 inches (96 cm). The eight year average annual runoff level is 0.11 inches (2.8 mm).

An annual mean of 35,862.5795 pounds (16,266.9924 kg) of sediment per day flows through Hemlock Creek. Most of the sediment (30,204.9315 pounds (13,700.7265 kg)) comes from cropland. 3,004.4425 pounds (1,362.7922 kg) come from stream banks and 1,585.7534 pounds (719.2856 kg) come from hay or pastures. 547.0137 pounds (248.1212 kg) comes from low-intensity development, 332.8767 pounds (150.9903 kg) come from forests, and 127.7260 pounds (57.9355 kg) come from unpaved roads. Additionally, 55.6164 pounds (25.2272 kg) come from land in transition, 3.2877 pounds (1.4913 kg) come from grass and turf, and 0.9315 pounds (0.4225 kg) come from high-intensity development.

== Watershed ==
The watershed of Hemlock Creek is 16 square miles (41 km^{2}) in area. Almost all of the watershed is in Columbia County, although a small area of it is in Montour County.

Interstate 80 and Pennsylvania Route 44 are the main highways in the southern and western part of the watershed. In addition, there are a number of township roads in the watershed.

Agricultural land is the most common land use in the Hemlock Creek watershed. 56% of the watershed is devoted to this land use. Forests make up 40% of the watershed's land and developed land makes up 4% of it.

== Geography and geology ==
The source of Hemlock Creek is 500 feet (150 m) higher in elevation than the mouth. The highest elevations occur in the western part of the watershed. The watershed is within the ridge and valley geographical province.

In the higher areas of the Hemlock Creek watershed, half of the rock is interbedded sedimentary rock. Much of the rock in the Hemlock Creek watershed is the Catskill Formation's Irish Valley Member and the Hamilton Group. Sandstone and shale of the Trimmers Rock Formation and the Wills Creek Formation also occurs in the watershed. Much of the northern two thirds of the creek's watershed is the Trimmers Rock Formation. Most of the rest of the northern part of the watershed has Irish Valley Member rocks, but an area in the northeastern part of the watershed has another rock formation. The southern part of the watershed has bands of Hamilton Group, Wills Creek Formation, Clinton Group, and Bloomsburg Formation and Mifflintown Formation undivided.

The most common soil series in the Hemlock Creek watershed, especially the upper part, is the Berks-Weikert-Bedington soil series, which is a silt loam with shale. Other soil series in the watershed include the Leck Kill-Meckesville-Calvin series and the Chenango-Pope- Holly soil series. The northern and southern portions of the watershed are home to the Berks-Weikert-Bedington series. The central part is home to the Leck Kill-Meckesville-Calvin series. The Chenango-Pope-Holly soil series occurs in a small area in the southeast of the watershed, near Bloomsburg.

A book from the 1800s described fossil ore, Bloomsburg red shale, and Middle Salina beds near Hemlock Creek. The Helderberg formation is present near the creek, but is buried under other rock formations. This ore contained hydrogen peroxide, silica, alumina, water, and traces of lime and carbonic acid.

There is one anticlinal crest which starts north of Bloomsburg and ends near the valley of Hemlock Creek.

Hemlock Creek cuts a wide valley through Montour Ridge.

== History ==
Hemlock Creek was known as Hemlock Creek in the earliest surveys of what is now Hemlock Township, and was then part of Wyoming Township, Northumberland County. Elisha Barton was an early settler in the Hemlock Creek area. He arrived there in 1781 and owned a tract of land between the mouth of Hemlock Creek and Buckhorn. Peter Brugler was another early settler in the region. He arrived in the Hemlock Creek watershed between 1788 and 1790. He owned 600 acres in Hemlock Township, including land along West Hemlock Creek.

A mill was built on West Hemlock Creek for the purpose of producing boards and timber. It was the first mill for this purpose in Hemlock Township. However, Barton had built a mill on the northern bank of Hemlock Creek 0.5 miles (0.80 km) from its mouth, shortly after arriving in the area. The mill was torn down and rebuilt by Isiah Barton in 1842. It was also renamed the Red Mill at this time. In 1885, Isiah McKelvy bought the mill and added a roller system. The mill was still operating as late as the 1910s.

Another mill was built in the upper reaches of Hemlock Creek in 1812, by a man named Pepper. It stopped operating before the 1910s. The White Mill was also built by the Barton family (James Barton, Isiah Barton's son to be specific) on Hemlock Creek near Bloomsburg in 1842. The White Mill's construction involved the use of the largest timbers of any mill in Columbia County. The mill was renovated in 1882 and renamed Montour Mills.

The Irondale Mine was historically operated near Hemlock Creek.

== Biology ==
In the parts of Hemlock Creek where agriculture is performed, there are few or no riparian buffers. Livestock can also access the creek in places. All the streams in the watershed are considered impaired by the EPA.

== See also ==
- Montour Run
- Little Fishing Creek
- List of rivers of Pennsylvania
