= Frozen Run =

Coordinates: 41.0107°N 76.5047°W

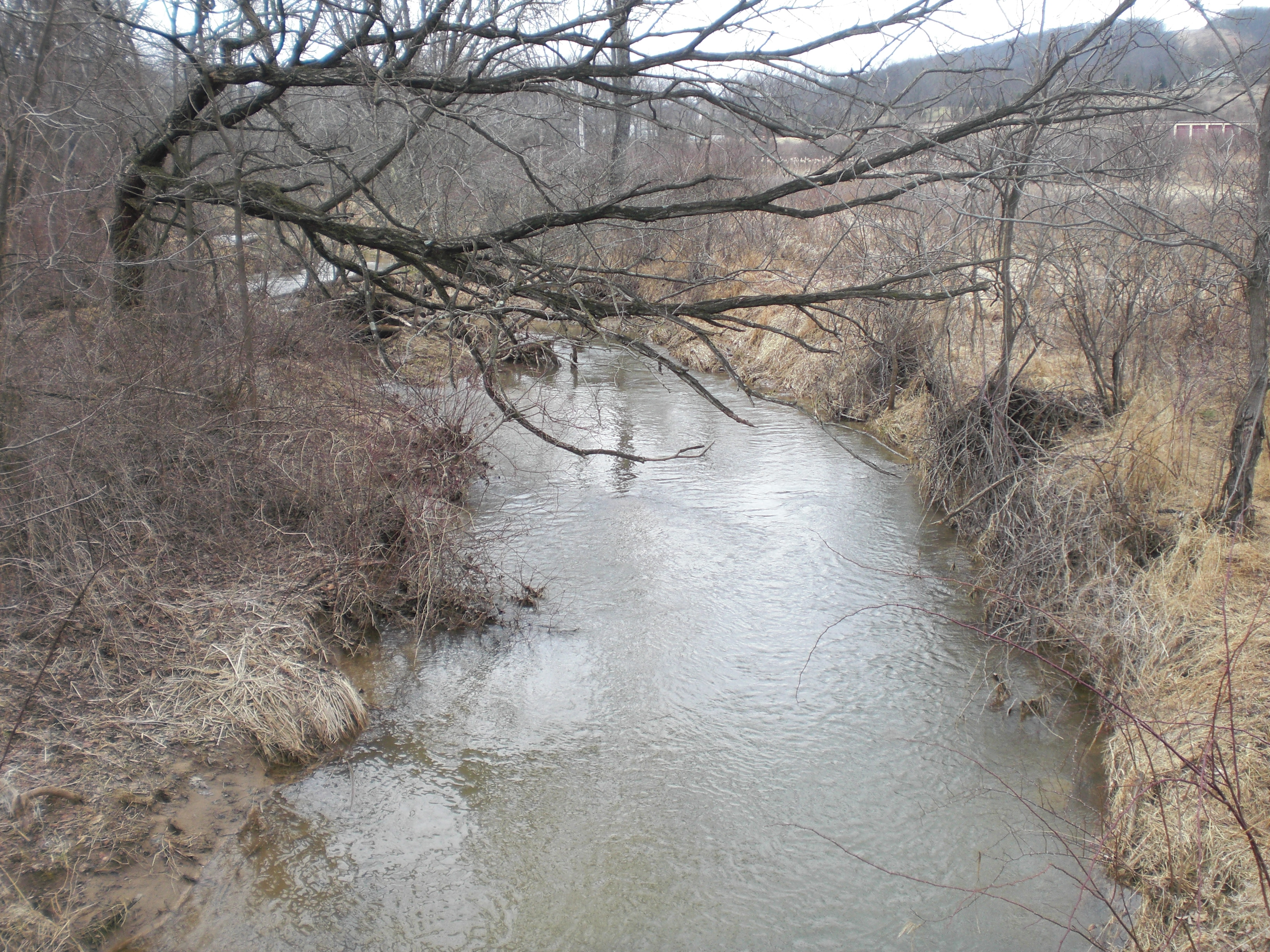
- Frozen Run near its mouth
- Etymology: it is known to freeze over

Physical characteristics
- Source
  - location: pond in Hemlock Township, Columbia County, Pennsylvania
- Mouth
  - location: Hemlock Creek in Hemlock Township, Columbia County, Pennsylvania
  - elevation: 535 ft (163 m)
- Length: 3.2 mi (5.1 km)
- Basin size: 3.55 mi^{2} (9.2 km^{2})

Basin features
- Progression: Hemlock Creek → Fishing Creek → Susquehanna River → Chesapeake Bay

Frozen Run is a tributary of Hemlock Creek in Columbia County, Pennsylvania, in the United States. It is approximately 3.2 miles (5.1 km) long and flows through Hemlock Township. The watershed of the stream has an area of 3.55 square miles (9.2 km^{2}). The stream flows through Frosty Valley and is also near a fault. It is designated as a coldwater fishery. Parts of the watershed are impaired due to siltation. The stream has several unnamed tributaries.

A. Joseph Armstrong describes Frozen Run as "pretty mundane" in his book Trout Unlimited's Guide to Pennsylvania Limestone Streams.

== Course ==
Frozen Run begins in a pond in Hemlock Township. It flows south in a valley for less than a mile before turning southeast, entering the much broader Frosty Valley. In Frosty Valley, the stream turns east and flows for a few miles before reaching its confluence with Hemlock Creek near the community of Buckhorn.

Frozen Run joins Hemlock Creek 2.26 miles (3.64 km) upstream of its mouth.

=== Tributaries ===
Frozen Run has a number of unnamed tributaries. These include UNT 65640513, UNT 65640565, UNT 65640671, and UNT 65640719.

== Hydrology, geography, and geology ==
Parts of Frozen Run and several of its unnamed tributaries are considered by the Pennsylvania Department of Environmental Protection to be impaired by siltation due to agriculture. 2.4 miles (3.9 km) of streams in the watershed are considered to be impaired.

The water temperature of Frozen Run is 68 °F (20 °C). The width of the stream is between 5 feet (1.5 m) and 10 feet (3.0 m). Frozen Run has an elevation of 535 feet (163 m) above sea level near its mouth.

Frozen Run mostly flows through rock of the Mahantango Formation. However, parts of the stream are over rock of the Harrell Formation and the stream's upper reaches lie over rock of the Trimmers Rock Formation. The stream is in Frosty Valley and is located near the Lightstreet Fault.

== Watershed ==
The watershed of Frozen Run has an area of 3.55 square miles (9.2 km^{2}). Areas that are hazardous during floods are largely undeveloped in the watershed of Frozen Run.

== Name and etymology ==
Frozen Run is named for the fact that it is sometimes frozen. A 1997 book listed Frozen Run as one of the most interesting stream names in Pennsylvania.

== Biology ==
Frozen Run has a large population of chubs. According to A. Joseph Armstrong, there may also be trout inhabiting the stream. Frozen Run is designated as a coldwater fishery.

There are forested seeps at the headwaters of Frozen Run. According to the Columbia County Natural Areas Inventory, these may contain "sensitive ecological features".

== See also ==
- List of tributaries of Fishing Creek (North Branch Susquehanna River)
- West Hemlock Creek
