= West Hemlock Creek =

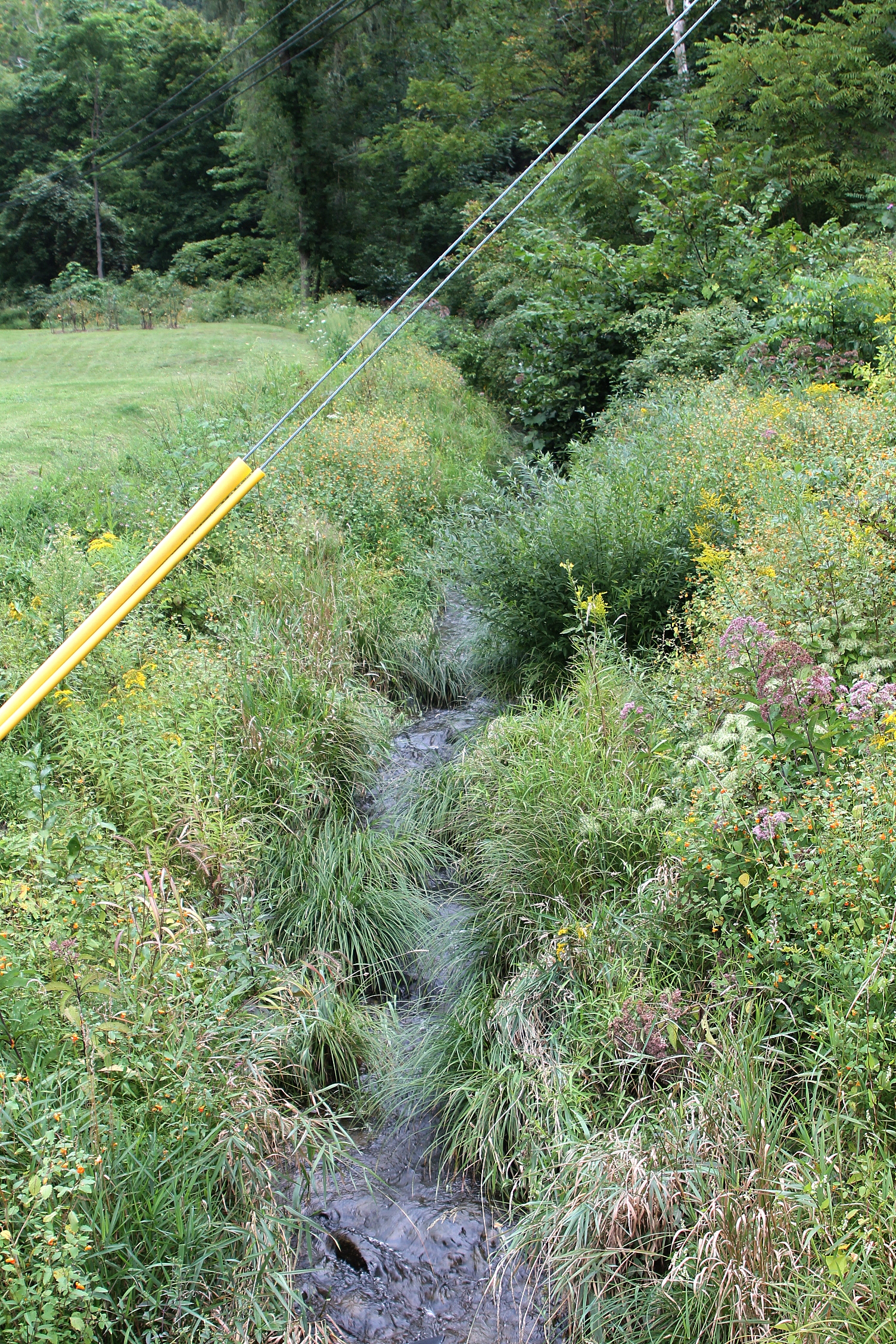
- West Hemolock Creek near its mouth looking upstream

Physical characteristics
- Source
  - location: valley in eastern West Hemlock Township, Montour County, Pennsylvania
- Mouth
  - location: Hemlock Creek in Hemlock Township, Columbia County, Pennsylvania
  - coordinates: 41°01′14″N 76°30′19″W
  - elevation: 567 ft (173 m)
- Length: 3.7 mi (6.0 km)
- Basin size: 2.80 sq mi (7.3 km^{2})

Basin features
- Progression: Hemlock Creek → Fishing Creek → Susquehanna River → Chesapeake Bay

West Hemlock Creek is a tributary of Hemlock Creek in Montour County and Columbia County, in Pennsylvania, in the United States. It is approximately 3.7 miles (6.0 km) long and flows through West Hemlock Township, Montour County and Hemlock Township, Columbia County. The creek has at least one unnamed tributary. West Hemlock Creek and its unnamed tributary are considered by the Pennsylvania Department of Environmental Protection to be impaired. The watershed of the creek has an area of 2.80 square miles (7.3 km^{2}). The creek is designated as a coldwater fishery. Rock formations in the watershed include the Catskill Formation and the Trimemrs Rock Formation.

== Course ==
West Hemlock Creek begins in a valley in eastern West Hemlock Township, near Hedge Road. It flows east for a short distance to the edge of the township and then flows along the township line for some distance. The creek then turns southeast into Hemlock Township, Columbia County.

In Hemlock Township, the valley of West Hemlock Creek gets deeper. The creek continues southeast and east for a few miles. It then leaves the valley and almost immediately reaches its confluence with Hemlock Creek near the community of Buckhorn.

West Hemlock Creek joins Hemlock Creek 3.02 miles (4.86 km) upstream of its mouth.

=== Tributaries ===
Tributaries of West Hemlock Creek include the unnamed tributary UNT 65640353.

== Hydrology, geography, and geology ==
3.7 miles (6.0 km) of West Hemlock Creek is considered by the Pennsylvania Department of Environmental Protection to be impaired. The cause of the impairment is siltation due to agricultural activity. 0.5 miles (0.80 km) of an unnamed tributary of the creek also experience the same impairment for the same reason.

The elevation of West Hemlock Creek near its mouth is 567 feet (173 m) above sea level. The lower reaches of the creek lie over rock of the Trimmers Rock Formation. The upper reaches are on rock of the Irish Valley Member of the Catskill Formation. It is also near the West Hemlock Creek Fault.

The areas along West Hemlock Creek that are a hazard for floods are mostly not developed.

== Watershed ==
The watershed of West Hemlock Creek has an area of 2.80 square miles (7.3 km^{2}). The land between the creek and Interstate 80 is forested.

== Biology ==
West Hemlock Creek is designated as a coldwater fishery. The slopes of the valley of West Hemlock Creek contain a riparian buffer that is composed mainly of eastern hemlock. There are also forested seeps on the creek. According to the Columbia County Natural Areas Inventory, these may contain "sensitive ecological features".

== See also ==
- Frozen Run
- List of tributaries of Fishing Creek (North Branch Susquehanna River)
