= Bill Kuster =

American television meteorologist

- Born: May 9, 1930; Fernville, Pennsylvania, US
- Died: August 12, 2006 (aged 76); Littleton, Colorado, US
- Education: Pennsylvania State University
- Occupation: Television meteorologist
- Spouse: Dottie
- Children: 2

Bill Kuster (May 9, 1930 – August 12, 2006) was an American television meteorologist. He was a weather forecaster at KYW-TV in Philadelphia from 1963 to 1979 and KUSA in Denver from 1979 to 1996.

== Biography ==
=== Early life and education ===
William E. Kuster was born on May 9, 1930, in Fernville, Pennsylvania. The Kuster family later moved to Bloomsburg, Pennsylvania, where he briefly attended Bloomsburg State College. He served for four years in the U.S. Navy during the Korean War before earning a bachelor's degree in journalism in 1956 from Pennsylvania State University.

=== Career ===
Bill Kuster's broadcast career began with a six-month period at WARM (AM) in Scranton as a substitute game show host and weatherman. He next worked at WGAL in Lancaster as a weatherman and assistant news director.

In 1963, he moved to the Philadelphia area and joined KYW-TV as a weekend weatherman. He started a vegetable garden, dubbed Kuster's Garden, at the station in 1975.

After he left KYW in 1979, he moved to Denver, Colorado, station KUSA-TV. He worked as KUSA's weekday and weekend weathercaster until his retirement in 1996. He continued the tradition of his Kuster Garden in Denver and expanded it to enlist a restaurateur to prepare meals with the annual harvest for Denver-area homeless shelters.

=== Marriage and children ===
Bill married the former Dottie Zettle c. 1955. The couple had two children, son Marc and daughter Kim.

=== Death and afterward ===
Kuster died on August 12, 2006, following a battle with leukemia.

The Broadcast Pioneers of Philadelphia inducted Kuster posthumously into their Hall of Fame in 2008.
