= Wanich Covered Bridge No. 69 =

- U.S. National Register of Historic Places
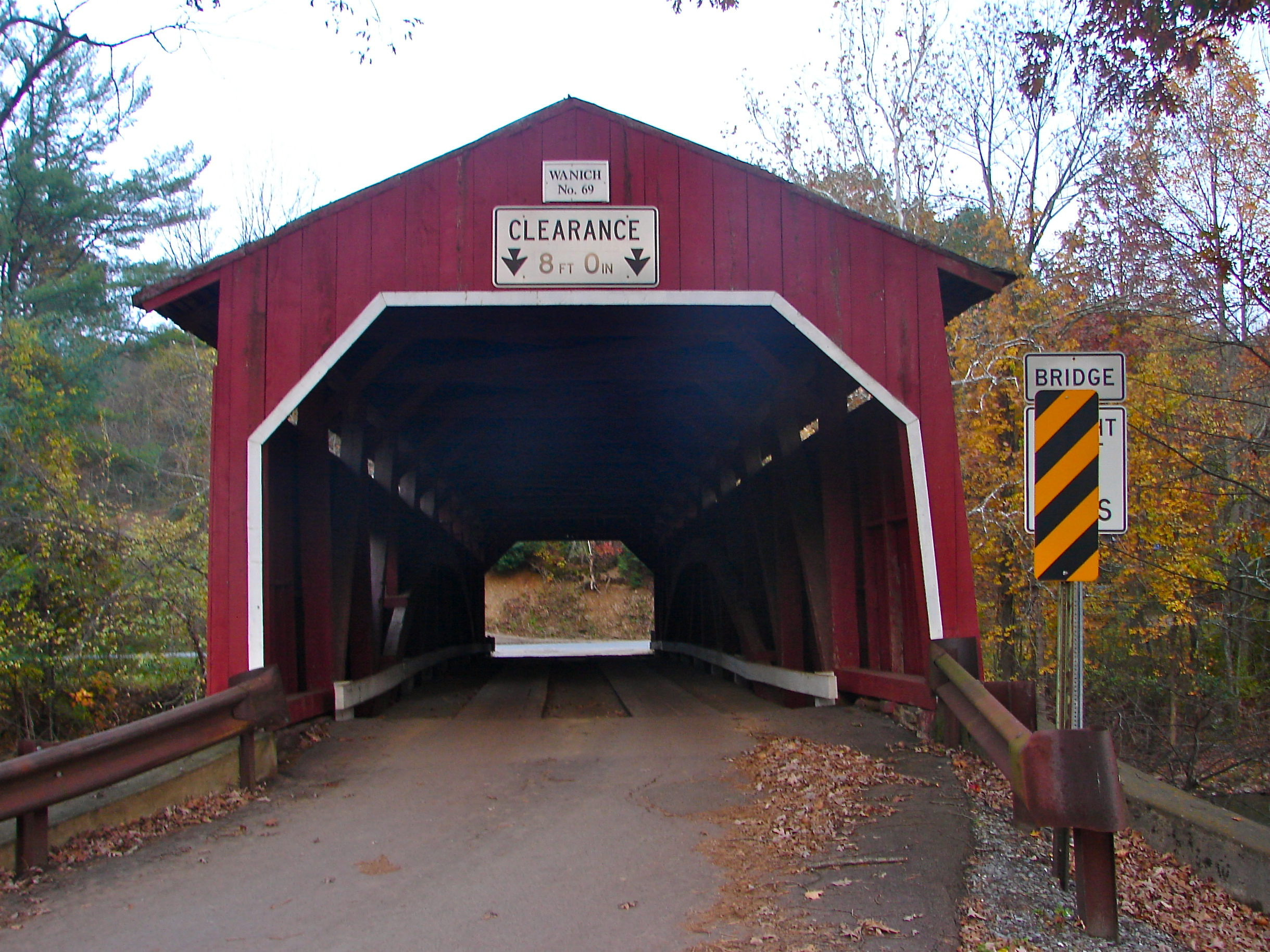
- Wanich Bridge, October 2011

- Location within Pennsylvania Location within the United States
- Location: Off Pennsylvania Route 42, north of Fernville, Hemlock Township and Mount Pleasant Township, Pennsylvania
- Coordinates: 41°2′23″N 76°29′1″W
- Area: 0.1 acres (0.040 ha)
- Built: 1844
- Built by: George Russell Jr.
- Architectural style: Burr Truss-Arch
- MPS: Covered Bridges of Columbia and Montour Counties TR
- NRHP reference No.: 79003195
- Added to NRHP: November 29, 1979

The Wanich Covered Bridge No. 69 is a historic wooden covered bridge located at Hemlock Township and Mount Pleasant Township in Columbia County, Pennsylvania. It is a 98.75-foot-long (30.10 m), Burr Truss arch bridge constructed in 1844. It is one of 28 historic covered bridges in Columbia and Montour Counties.

It was listed on the National Register of Historic Places in 1979.
