= Mount Pleasant Township, Columbia County, Pennsylvania =

Township in Pennsylvania, US

Coordinates: 41°05′00″N 76°27′59″W

- Township
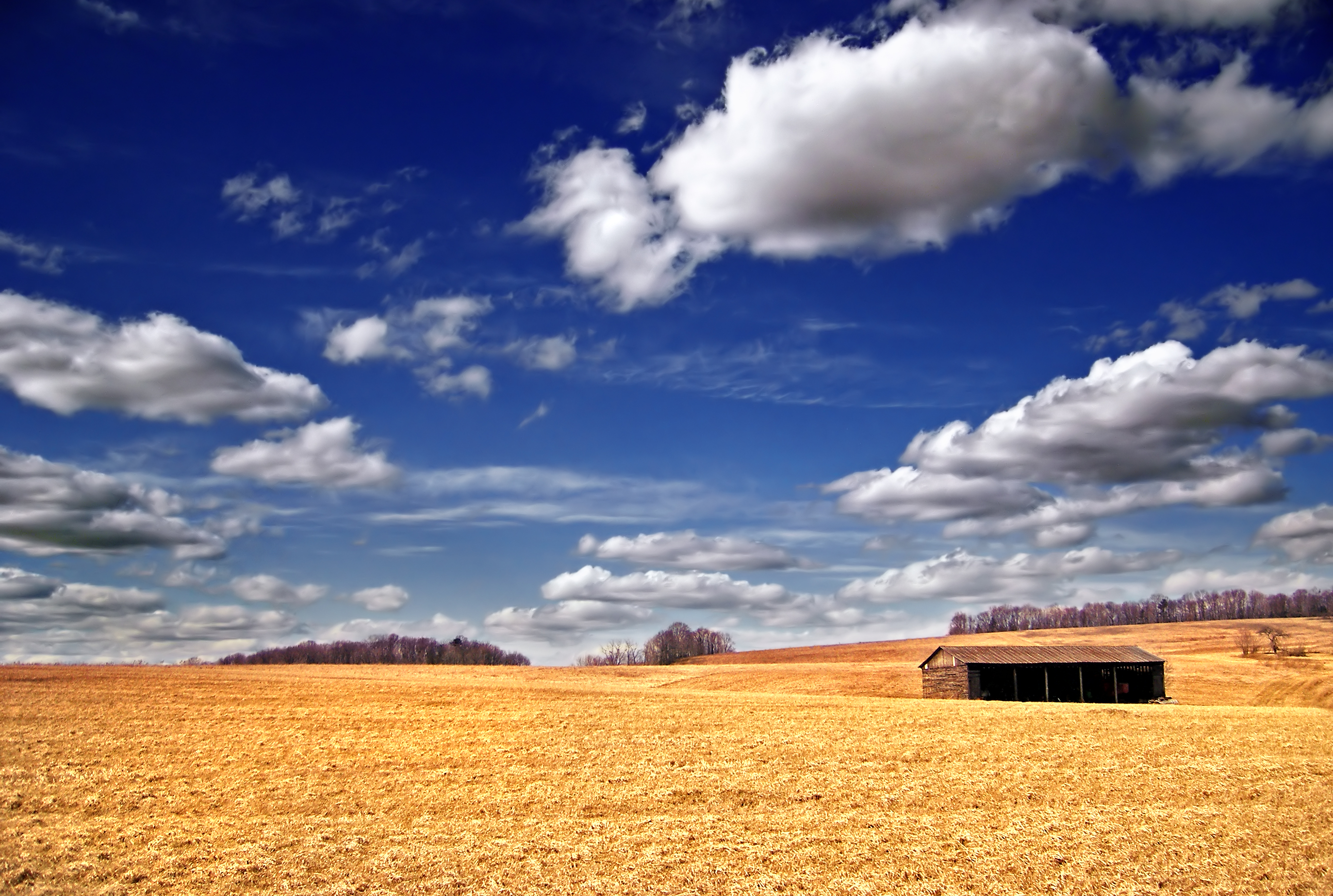
- A view of a farm in Mount Pleasant Township

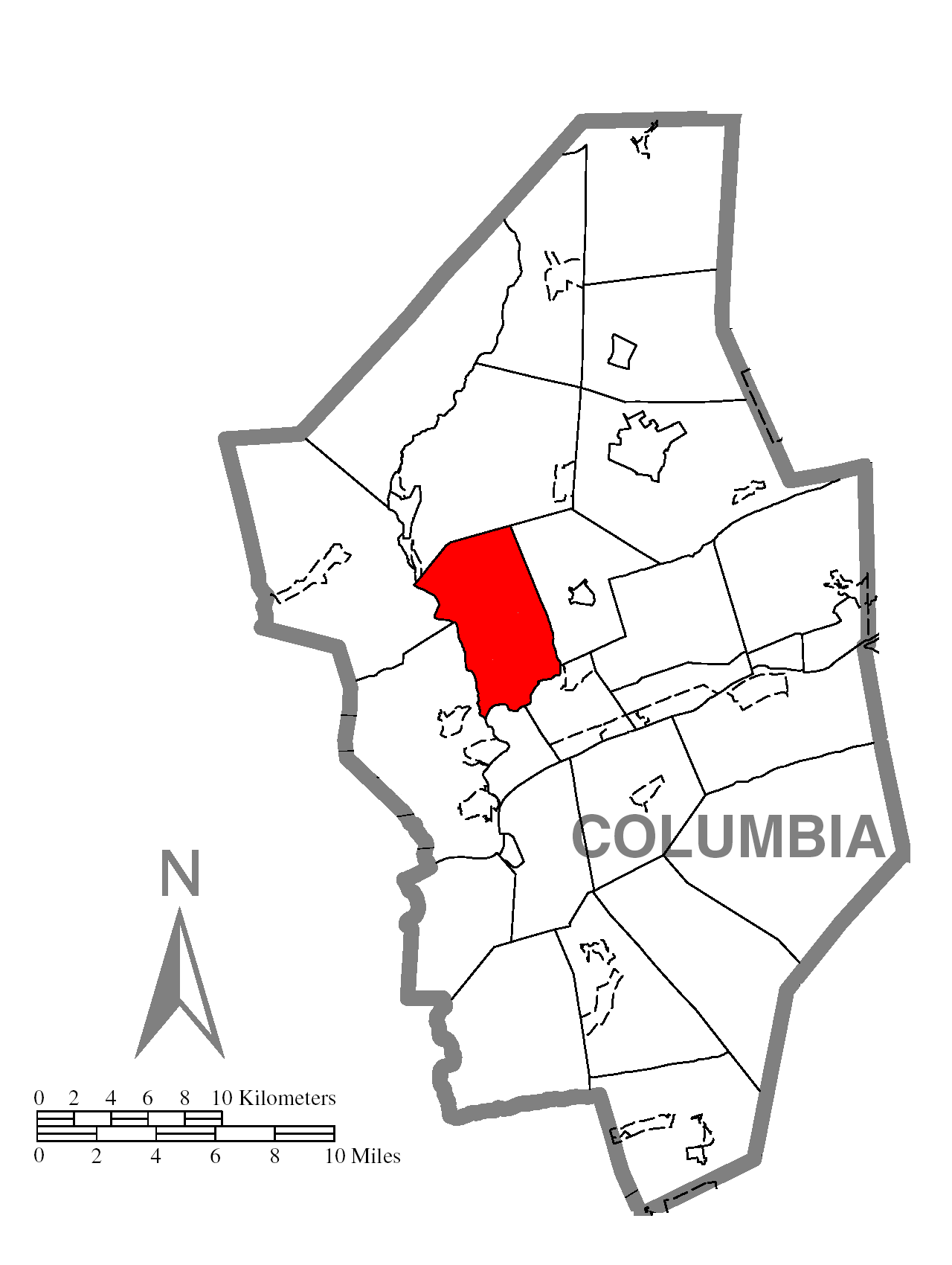
- Map of Columbia County, Pennsylvania highlighting Mount Pleasant Township

- Map of Columbia County, Pennsylvania
- Country: United States
- State: Pennsylvania
- County: Columbia
- Settled: 1778
- Incorporated: 1818

Area
  - Total: 16.91 sq mi (43.80 km^{2})
  - Land: 16.75 sq mi (43.39 km^{2})
  - Water: 0.16 sq mi (0.41 km^{2})

Population (2020)
  - Total: 1,506 ▼
  - Estimate (2021): 1,514
  - Density: 96/sq mi (36.9/km^{2})
- Time zone: UTC-5 (Eastern (EST))
  - Summer (DST): UTC-4 (EDT)
- Area code: 570
- FIPS code: 42-037-51792
- Website: www.mtpleasantcolumbiapa.org

Mount Pleasant Township is a township in Columbia County, Pennsylvania. It is part of Northeastern Pennsylvania. As of the 2020 census, the township population was 1,506.

== History ==
Mount Pleasant Township was formed in 1818 from Fishingcreek Township, Greenwood Township, and Bloom Township, which is now Bloomsburg. The Wanich Covered Bridge No. 69 was listed on the National Register of Historic Places in 1979.

== Geography ==
The township is located northwest of the center of Columbia County, and is bordered to the south by the town of Bloomsburg, the county seat. Fishing Creek, a tributary of the Susquehanna River, forms the southern and part of the eastern boundary of the township, while Little Fishing Creek forms the western boundary. The township includes the unincorporated communities of Welliversville, Mordansville, and Millertown. According to the United States Census Bureau, the township has a total area of 16.9 square miles (43.8 km^{2}), of which 16.8 square miles (43.4 km^{2}) is land and 0.2 square miles (0.4 km^{2}), or 0.93%, is water.

== Demographics ==
Historical population
| Census | Pop. | Note | %± |
|---|---|---|---|
| 2010 | 1,609 | | — |
| 2020 | 1,506 | | −6.4% |
| 2021 (est.) | 1,514 | | 0.5% |

As of the census of 2000, there were 1,459 people, 544 households, and 425 families residing in the township. The population density was 83.6 inhabitants per square mile (32.3/km^{2}). There were 561 housing units at an average density of 32.1 units per square mile (12.4 units/km^{2}). The racial makeup of the township was 98.77% White, 0.14% African American, 0.48% Asian, 0.07% from other races, and 0.55% from two or more races. Hispanic or Latino of any race were 0.21% of the population.

There were 544 households, out of which 35.1% had children under the age of 18 living with them, 70.2% were married couples living together, 4.2% had a female householder with no husband present, and 21.7% were non-families. 17.3% of all households were made up of individuals, and 5.3% had someone living alone who was 65 years of age or older. The average household size was 2.68 and the average family size was 3.05.

In the township the population was spread out, with 25.1% under the age of 18, 6.9% from 18 to 24, 30.6% from 25 to 44, 27.8% from 45 to 64, and 9.7% who were 65 years of age or older. The median age was 39 years. For every 100 females, there were 109.0 males. For every 100 females age 18 and over, there were 103.9 males.

The median income for a household in the township was $43,816, and the median income for a family was $49,038. Males had a median income of $33,421 versus $24,450 for females. The per capita income for the township was $20,731. About 5.3% of families and 6.5% of the population were below the poverty line, including 11.0% of those under age 18 and none of those age 65 or over.

== Education ==
The area's local school district is the Central Columbia School District. It serves about 2,100 students and features three academic buildings and one administration building. Students are divided into the Elementary School (grades K through 4), Middle School (grades 5 through 8) and the Central Columbia High School (grades 9 through 12).

According to the 2003 data collected by Standard & Poor's, 18.4% of students are economically disadvantaged, 13.1% receive special education services and 71.1% of students pass the state-mandated testing. The district spends about $6,999 per student.

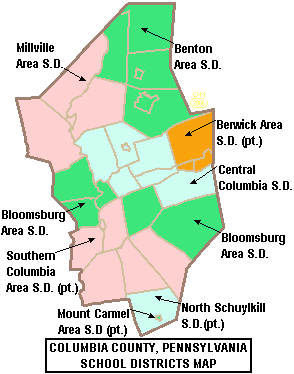
Map of Columbia County, Pennsylvania School Districts, with Central Columbia School District in blue in the center of the county.

In 2007, the Pittsburgh Business Times ranked the district 146th out of 499 Pennsylvania school districts based on three years of Pennsylvania System of Student Assessment test scores.
