= Columbia Colonnade =

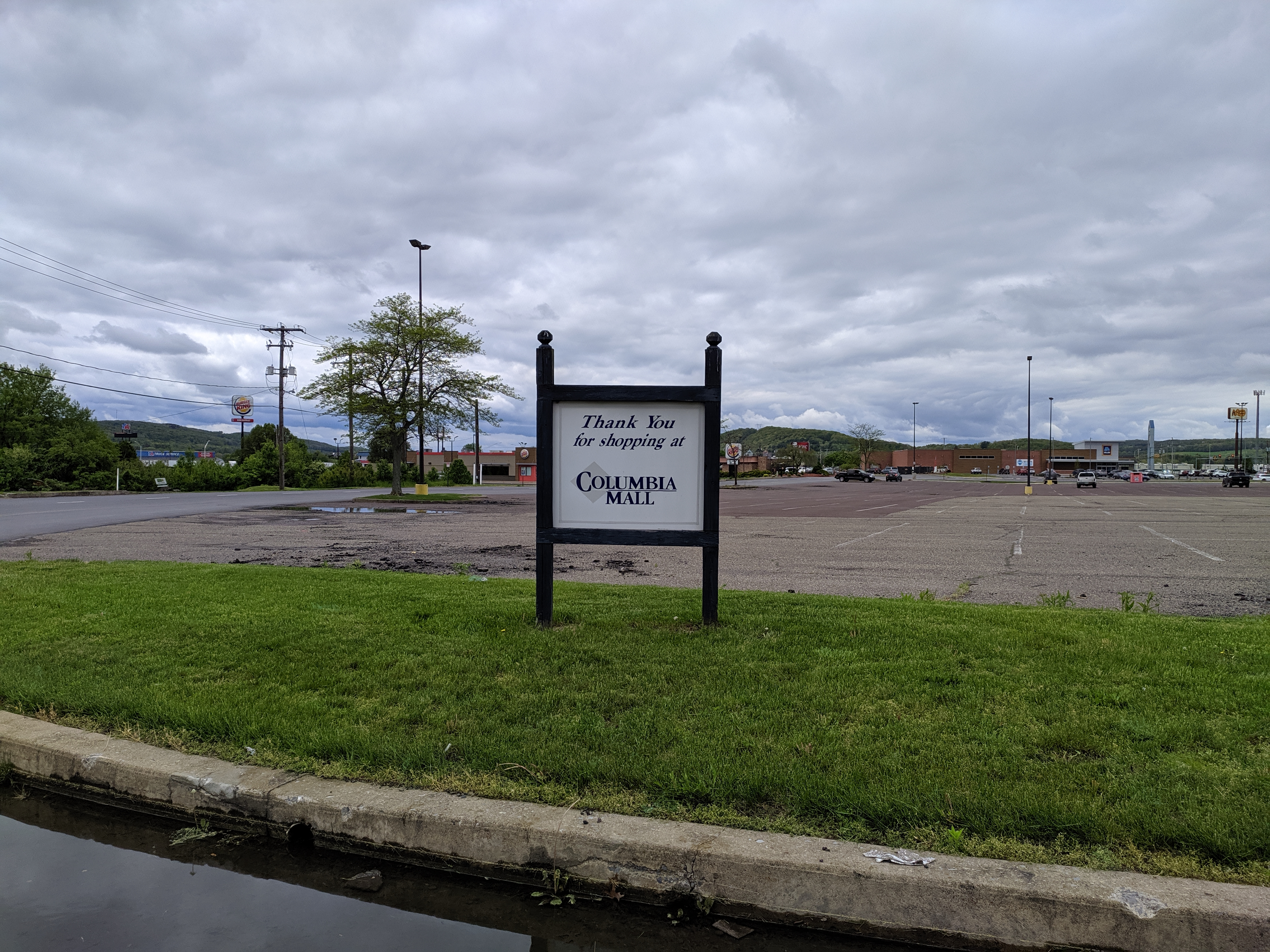
- Location: Buckhorn, Pennsylvania, United States
- Coordinates: 41.01721°N 76.48690°W
- Address: 225 Columbia Mall Drive
- Opened: 1988
- Closed: March 31, 2022
- Developer: Zamias
- Owner: Foust Holdings LLC
- Num. of stores: 0
- Num. of anchor tenants: 3-6(formerly 4)
- Floor area: 352,544 sq ft (32,752.4 m^{2})
- Floors: 1
- Parking: 2,419 spaces

Columbia Colonnade (formerly Columbia Mall) was a shopping mall located just outside Bloomsburg, Pennsylvania. It was anchored by EFO Furniture, Planet Fitness, Dunham's Sports, MVP Clubhouse, and a VA Clinic. The mall was next to Interstate 80 and PA 42. It also served the Bloomsburg University of Pennsylvania, as well as several surrounding communities, such as Bloomsburg and Buckhorn, Pennsylvania.

== History ==
Columbia Colonnade's construction was estimated to cost more than $30 million. The mall opened in 1988 with anchors Sears, J. C. Penney, The Bon-Ton, and Hills Department Stores. Sears and J. C. Penney moved from downtown Bloomsburg, Pennsylvania, to become anchor stores when the mall opened. The mall was sold early in its existence for $36 million to Heitman Advisory Corp. In 1995, Columbia Mall was sold for $27.6 million. The only anchor change during this time was when Hills converted to Ames in 1999. After the closure of Ames in 2002, the vacant store was used occasionally for the Animal Resource Center Yard Sale, Eagle Arms Gun Show, and WNEP Outdoor Expo. Cedar Shopping Centers (Cedar Bloomsburg LLC) bought the mall in 2005 for $14 million from Bay View Columbia Mall, with reconstruction plans existing in 2008. WP Realty joined as a 25% owner of the mall in 2008.

Non-retail office space leases at the mall started in the early 2010s and included Geisinger Health Plan. Dunham's Sports opened in 2011 occupying most of the empty Ames store. Cedar sold the mall in April 2013 for $2.8 million to Empire Columbia LP and management was replaced. Sears closed in January 2015. EFO Furniture opened in February 2017, occupying a portion of the former Sears. Planet Fitness opened in spring 2017, occupying half of the former Sears. J. C. Penney closed at the mall on July 31, 2017. Bon-Ton closed in 2018 due to the chain's liquidation. MVP Clubhouse opened in Summer 2018, occupying the remaining former Ames.

Columbia Mall was renamed to Columbia Colonnade on November 1, 2018. Greenwood Farm Market, a farmers market, opened at the Colonnade in April 2019. Columbia Colonnade was sold by Empire Columbia LP (Empire Realty Investments) to Foust Holdings LLC for $7 million in July 2019. The mall lost several stores due to the COVID-19 pandemic in 2020. Partial reconstruction plans were announced in July 2020, with a Veterans Affairs office opening planned for August. Three stores remained in the mall's interior during January 2021. Columbia Colonnade during 2021 suffered from drinking water issues, heating/cooling problems, lack of staff including security, and roof leaks. Communication with ownership was complicated, due to them not responding.

The last inline tenant, Outback Roos, closed on March 31, 2022, along with the mall's interior. The malls deteriorating condition was one of the causes of Outback Roos closure. Columbia Colonnade was originally scheduled to be auctioned in July 2022 with a starting bid of $3.4 million, but that was later delayed until August. Kohan Retail Investment Group made an offer prior to the auction, but it was not accepted. Under Foust's ownership, the mall received $1.4 million in changes. Columbia Colonnade did not sell in August, as the auction failed to meet the reserve price of $20 million.

== Planned Revival ==
After multiple failed attempts to auction off the property, the owner, Foust Development, decided to try and revive the mall. On March 12, Foust announced that some retailers had signed leases. The two retailers were Ollie's Bargain Outlet that would move into the old J.C. Penney store and Michael's Crafts that would move into the fomer Sears previously occupied by EFO Furniture store, which relocated to the former Bon-Ton location. There is also interest in the mall from popular retailers such as TJ Maxx, Five Below, and more. Foust plans to have the stores renovated and retailers moved in by July 2024. In addition to the Arby's being built on one of the mall's lots, Foust hopes to attract interest from Jersey Mike's Subs or Primanti Bros.

The malls interior items were sold off through most of 2025, with further redevelopment plans ongoing.

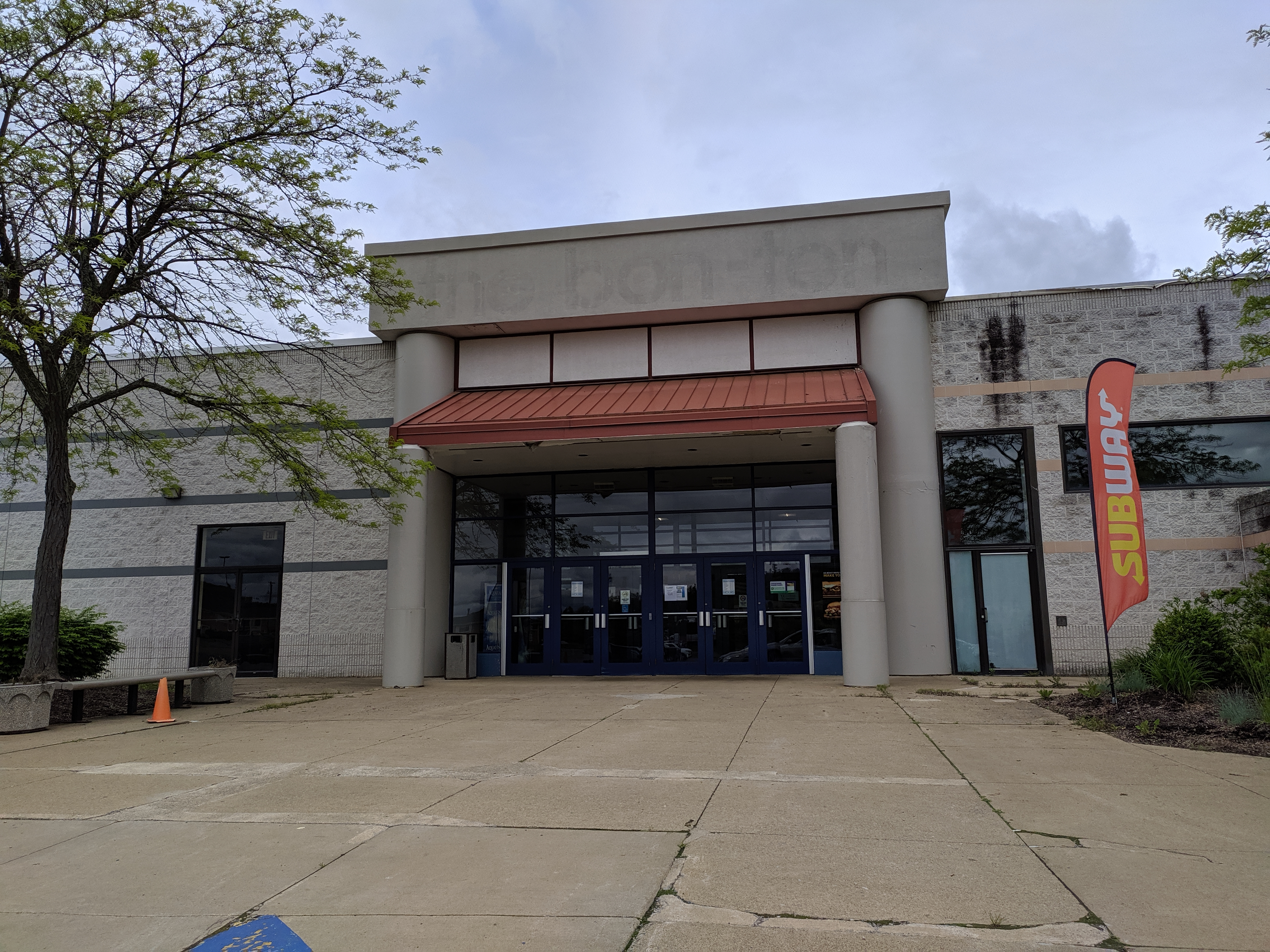
One of the entrances to the mall's concourse on May 8, 2021

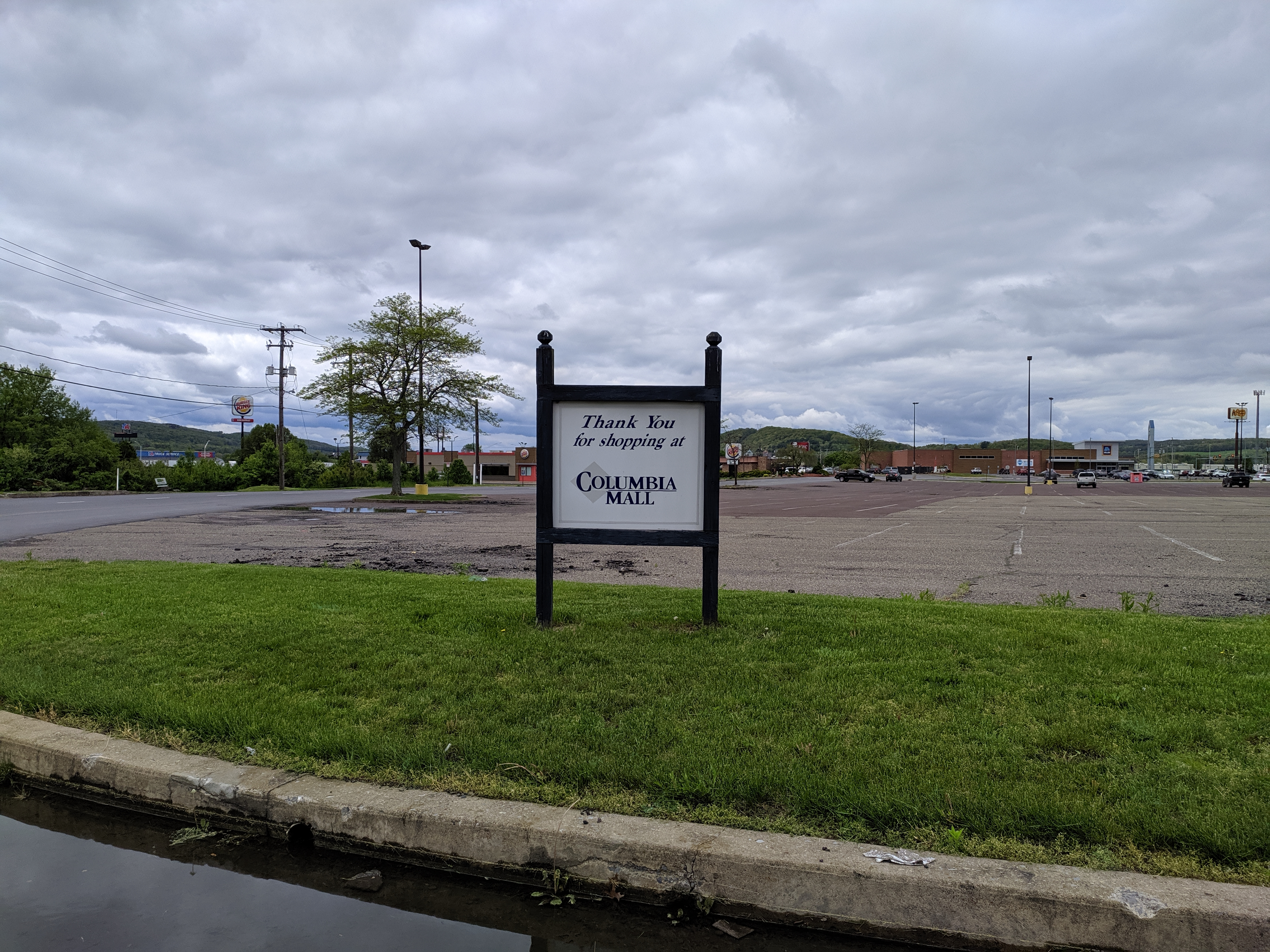
A sign thanking visitors to the mall on May 8, 2021

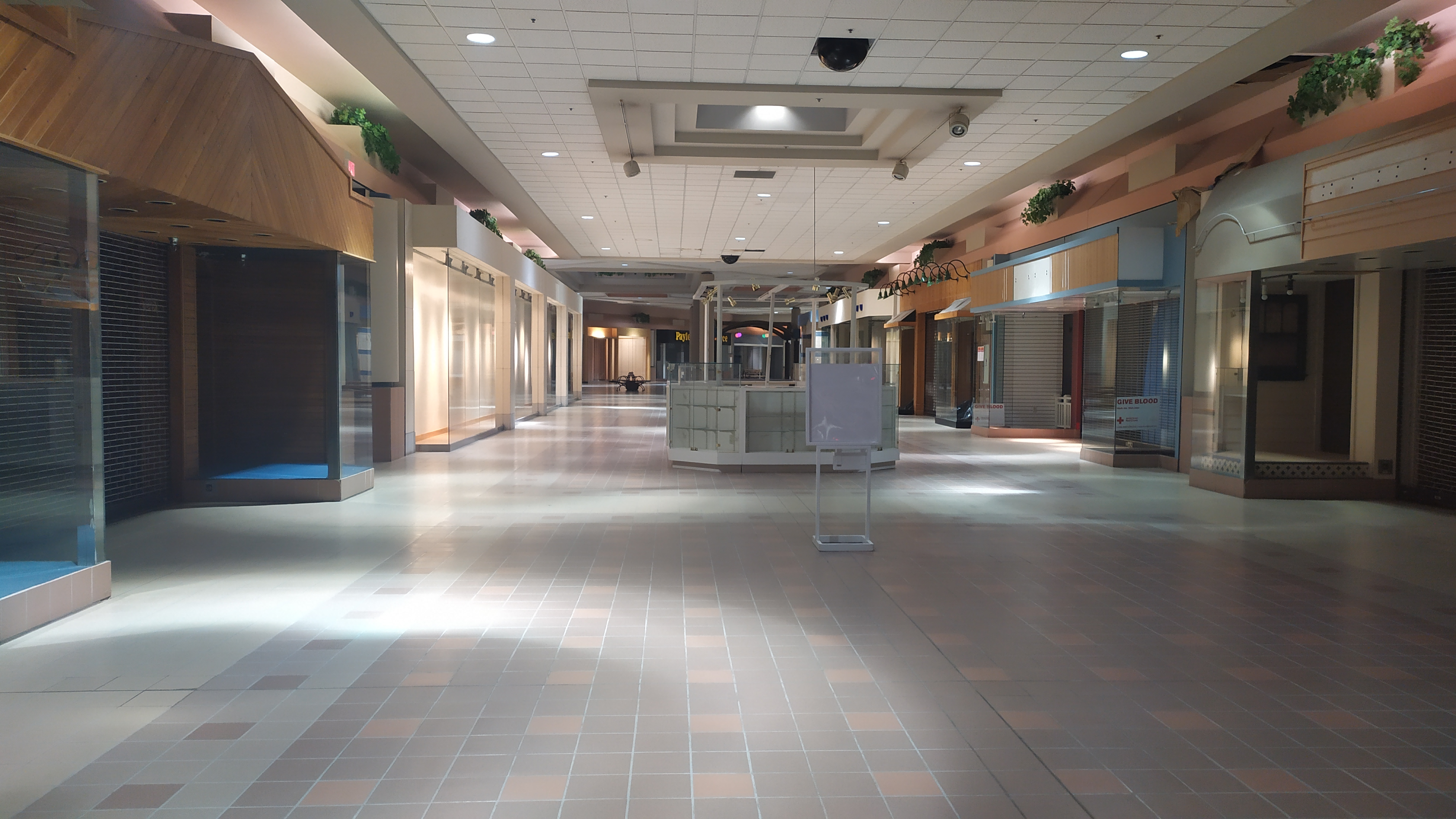
The mall's concourse at night on May 7, 2021, looking towards the JCPenney (now Ollie's) court and EFO Furniture Outlet (Former Sears, later Michael's)
