= Hemlock Township, Columbia County, Pennsylvania =

Township in Pennsylvania, US

Coordinates: 41°01′30″N 76°31′29″W

- Township
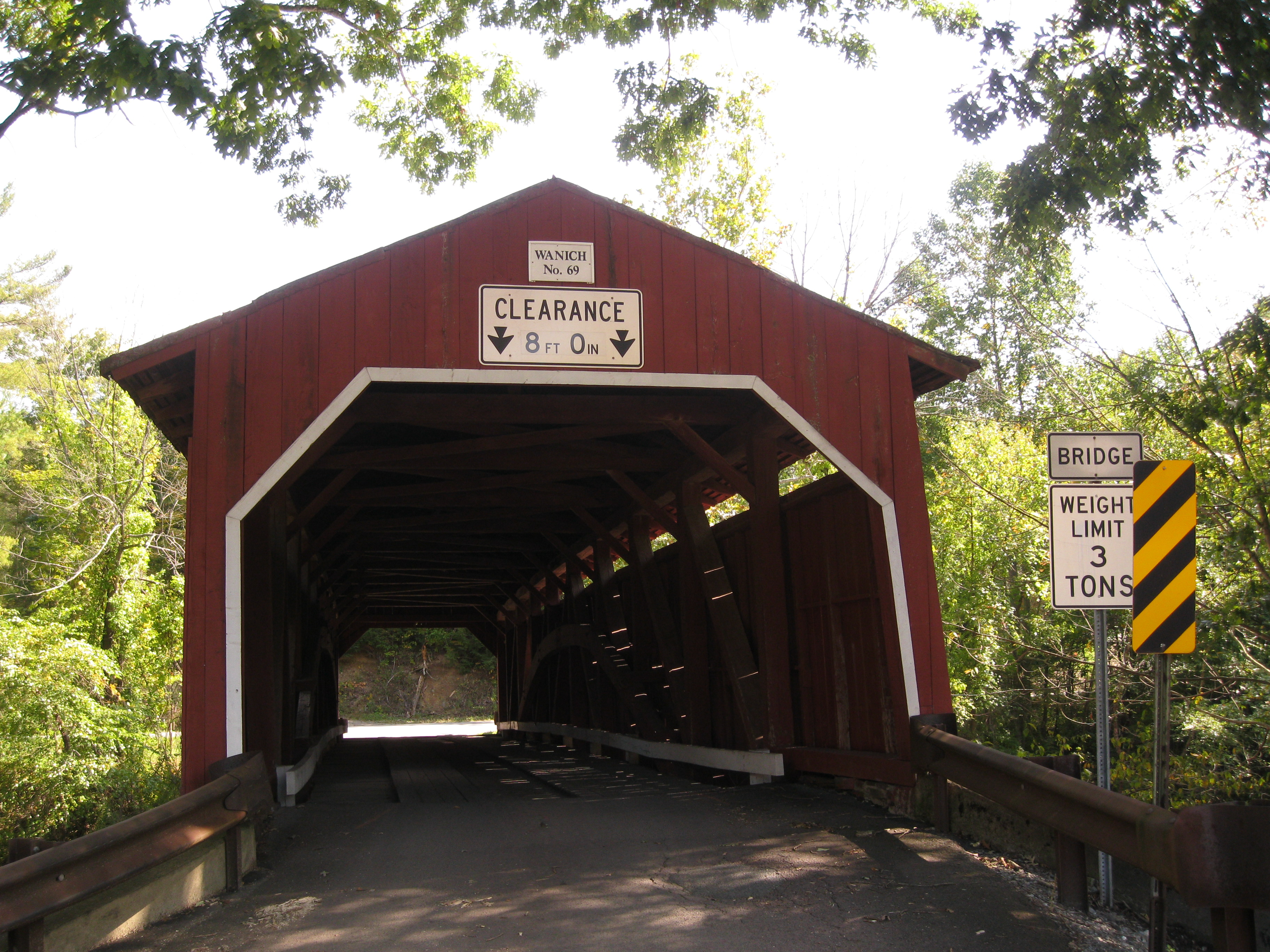
- The western end of Wanich Covered Bridge No. 69 is in the township; the bridge crosses Fishing Creek into Mount Pleasant Township.
- Motto(s): "Tradition, progress, community"
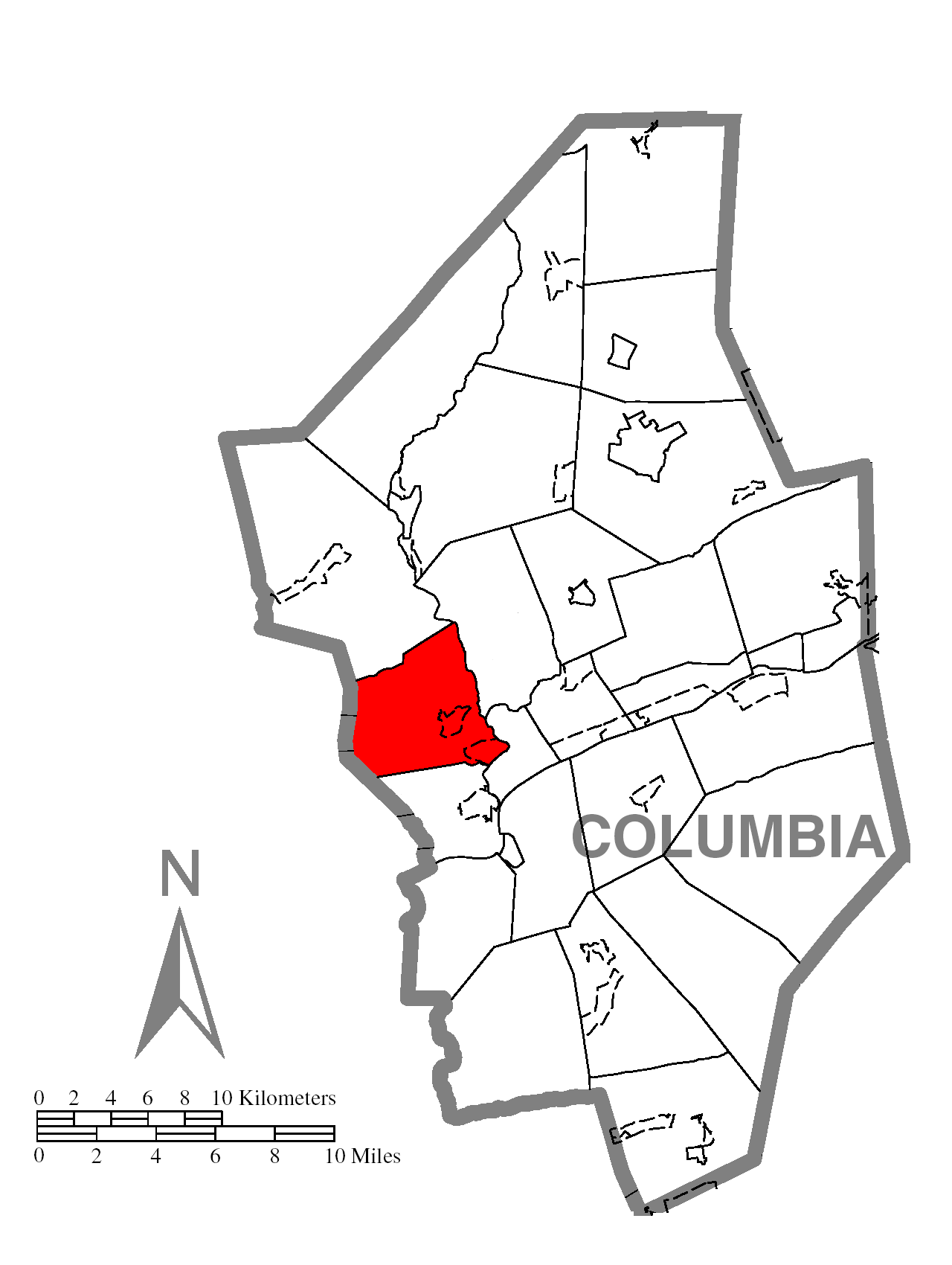
- Map of Columbia County, Pennsylvania highlighting Hemlock Township

- Map of Columbia County, Pennsylvania
- Country: United States
- State: Pennsylvania
- County: Columbia
- Settled: 1770
- Incorporated: 1801

Area
  - Total: 17.64 sq mi (45.70 km^{2})
  - Land: 17.56 sq mi (45.47 km^{2})
  - Water: 0.089 sq mi (0.23 km^{2})

Population (2020)
  - Total: 2,218 ▼
  - Estimate (2021): 2,228
  - Density: 128.7/sq mi (49.68/km^{2})
- Time zone: UTC-5 (Eastern (EST))
  - Summer (DST): UTC-4 (EDT)
- Area code: 570
- FIPS code: 42-037-33760
- Website: hemlocktownship.org

Hemlock Township is a township in Columbia County, Pennsylvania. It is part of Northeastern Pennsylvania. As of the 2020 census the population was 2,218, a decline from the figure of 2,249 tabulated in 2010.

== History ==
The Wanich Covered Bridge No. 69 was listed on the National Register of Historic Places in 1979.

== Geography ==
Hemlock Township is in western Columbia County, bordered by Montour County to the west, Montour Township to the south, Bloomsburg to the southeast, Mount Pleasant Township to the northeast, and Madison Township to the north. Little Fishing Creek and Fishing Creek, flowing south towards the Susquehanna River, form the eastern boundary of the township. The unincorporated community of Buckhorn is in the east-center of the township, and Fernville, a densely settled neighborhood adjacent to Bloomsburg, is in the southeast corner.

Interstate 80 crosses the township from west to east, with access from Exit 232 (Pennsylvania Route 42) at Buckhorn. The Columbia Colonnade (formerly Columbia Mall) is next to the exit.

According to the United States Census Bureau, the township has a total area of 17.6 square miles (45.7 km^{2}), of which 17.6 square miles (45.5 km^{2}) is land and 0.08 square miles (0.2 km^{2}), or 0.51%, is water.

== Demographics ==
Historical population
| Census | Pop. | Note | %± |
|---|---|---|---|
| 2010 | 2,249 | | — |
| 2020 | 2,218 | | −1.4% |
| 2021 (est.) | 2,228 | | 0.5% |
U.S. Decennial Census

As of the census of 2000, there were 1,874 people, 712 households, and 548 families residing in the township. The population density was 106.5 inhabitants per square mile (41.1/km^{2}). There were 747 housing units at an average density of 42.5 units per square mile (16.4 units/km^{2}). The racial makeup of the township was 98.13% White, 0.32% African American, 0.48% Asian, 0.32% from other races, and 0.75% from two or more races. Hispanic or Latino of any race were 0.69% of the population.

There were 712 households, out of which 32.7% had children under the age of 18 living with them, 68.3% were married couples living together, 5.1% had a female householder with no husband present, and 22.9% were non-families. 17.4% of all households were made up of individuals, and 7.3% had someone living alone who was 65 years of age or older. The average household size was 2.63 and the average family size was 2.97.

In the township the population was spread out, with 25.6% under the age of 18, 5.1% from 18 to 24, 31.8% from 25 to 44, 24.3% from 45 to 64, and 13.3% who were 65 years of age or older. The median age was 38 years. For every 100 females, there were 101.1 males. For every 100 females age 18 and over, there were 96.6 males.

The median income for a household in the township was $42,292, and the median income for a family was $49,097. Males had a median income of $33,229 versus $23,750 for females. The per capita income for the township was $21,125. About 4.1% of families and 5.6% of the population were below the poverty line, including 5.7% of those under age 18 and 9.9% of those age 65 or over.
