= Fernville, Pennsylvania =

Unincorporated community in Pennsylvania, US

- Census-designated place
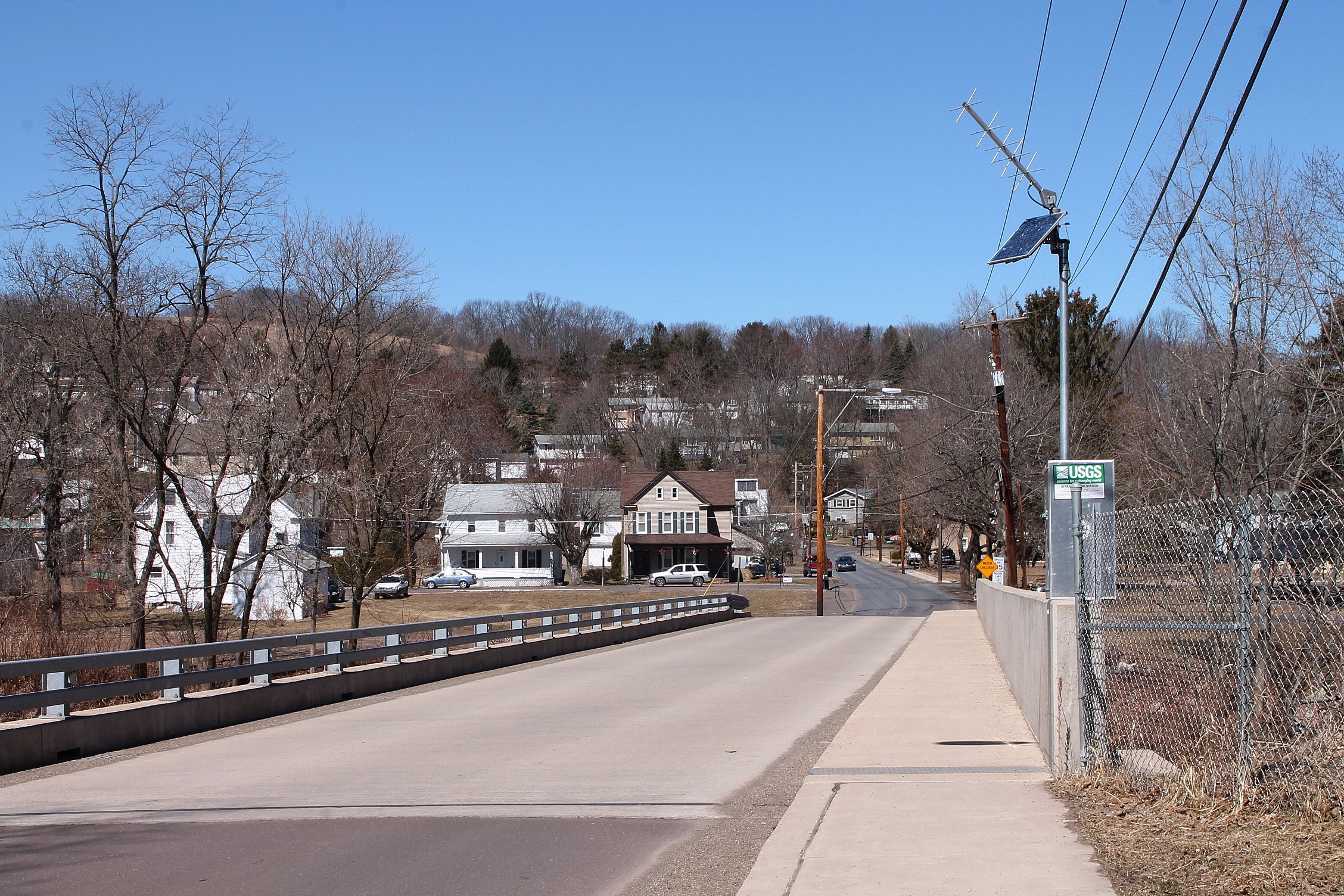
- Fernville as seen from Bloomsburg

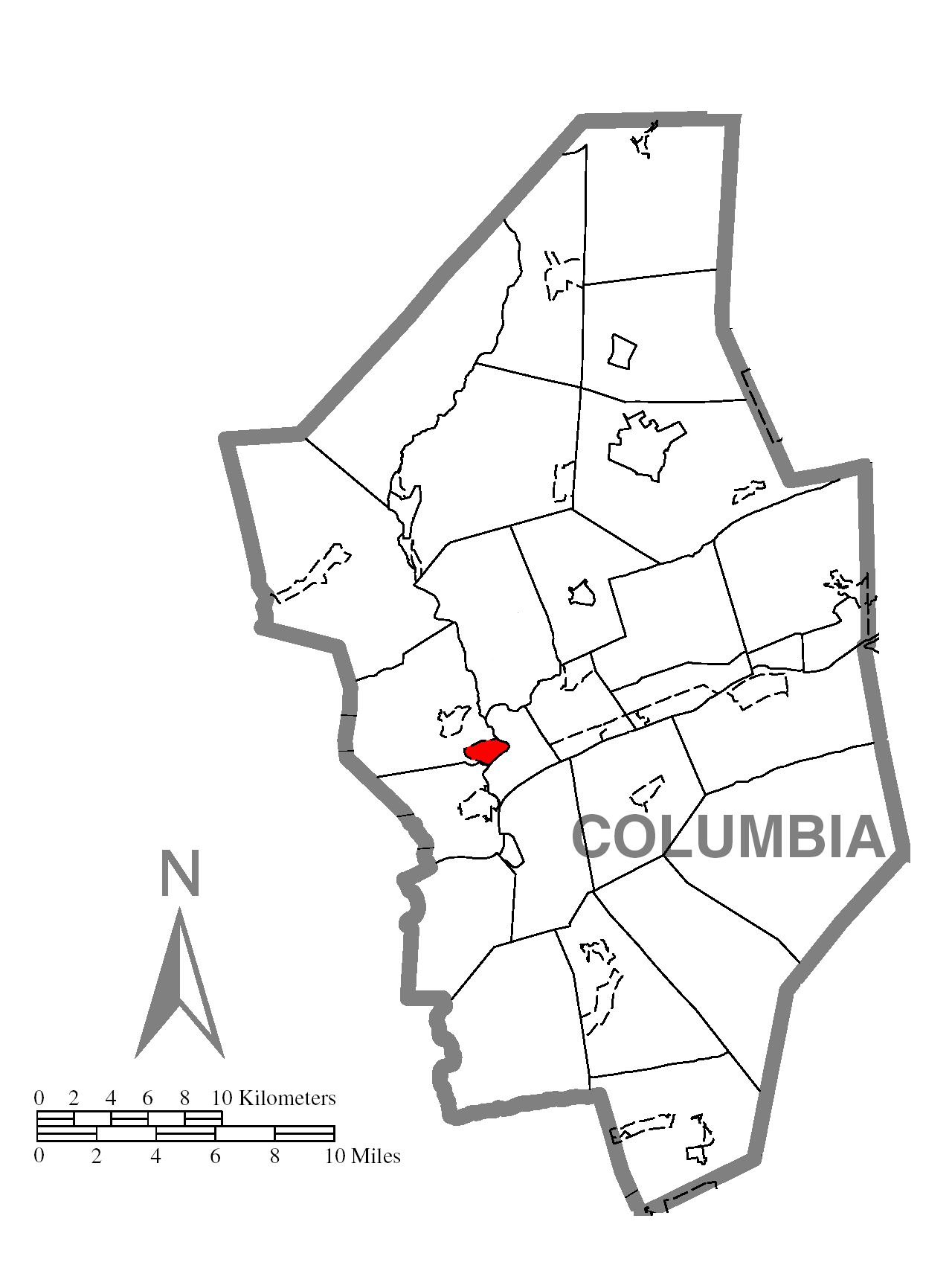
- Location within Columbia County

- Location within the U.S. state of Pennsylvania Fernville (the United States)
- Coordinates: 41°0′14″N 76°27′57″W
- Country: United States
- State: Pennsylvania
- County: Columbia
- Township: Hemlock

Area
  - Total: 0.83 sq mi (2.14 km^{2})
  - Land: 0.81 sq mi (2.09 km^{2})
  - Water: 0.019 sq mi (0.05 km^{2})
- Elevation: 490 ft (150 m)

Population (2020)
  - Total: 481
  - Density: 595.6/sq mi (229.98/km^{2})
- Time zone: UTC-5 (Eastern (EST))
  - Summer (DST): UTC-4 (EDT)
- ZIP code: 17815
- FIPS code: 42-25744
- GNIS feature ID: 1174706

Fernville is a census-designated place (CDP) in Columbia County, Pennsylvania, United States. It is part of Northeastern Pennsylvania. The population was 481 at the 2020 census. It is part of the Bloomsburg-Berwick micropolitan area.

== Geography ==
Fernville is located in western Columbia County at 41°0′14″N 76°27′57″W (41.003980, -76.465813), across Fishing Creek from Bloomsburg, the county seat. Fernville is in the southeastern corner of Hemlock Township.

According to the United States Census Bureau, the CDP has a total area of 0.83 square miles (2.14 km^{2}), of which 0.81 square miles (2.09 km^{2}) is land and 0.02 square miles (0.05 km^{2}), or 2.33%, is water.

== Demographics ==
Historical population
Census	Pop.	Note	%±
2020	481		—
U.S. Decennial Census

As of the census of 2000, there were 488 people, approximately 196 households, and 149 families residing in the CDP. The population density was 599.6 inhabitants per square mile (231.5/km^{2}). There were 209 housing units at an average density of 256.8 per square mile (99.2/km^{2}). The racial makeup of the CDP was 96.52% White, 1.23% African American, 0.61% Asian, 1.23% from other races, and 0.41% from two or more races. Hispanic or Latino of any race were 1.43% of the population.

There were 196 households, out of which 30.6% had children under the age of 18 living with them, 66.8% were married couples living together, 6.1% had a female householder with no husband present, and 23.5% were non-families. 20.9% of all households were made up of individuals, and 10.2% had someone living alone who was 65 years of age or older. The average household size was 2.49 and the average family size was 2.81.

In the CDP, the population was spread out, with 24.0% under the age of 18, 5.3% from 18 to 24, 28.7% from 25 to 44, 27.0% from 45 to 64, and 15.0% who were 65 years of age or older. The median age was 40 years. For every 100 females, there were 96.8 males. For every 100 females age 18 and over, there were 88.3 males.

The median income for a household in the CDP was $43,571, and the median income for a family was $53,750. Males had a median income of $33,750 versus $24,107 for females. The per capita income for the CDP was $29,098. About 2.6% of families and 4.4% of the population were below the poverty line, including 6.0% of those under age 18 and 5.4% of those age 65 or over.

== Education ==
The school district is Bloomsburg Area School District.
