= Buckhorn, Pennsylvania =

Unincorporated community in Pennsylvania, US

- Census-designated place
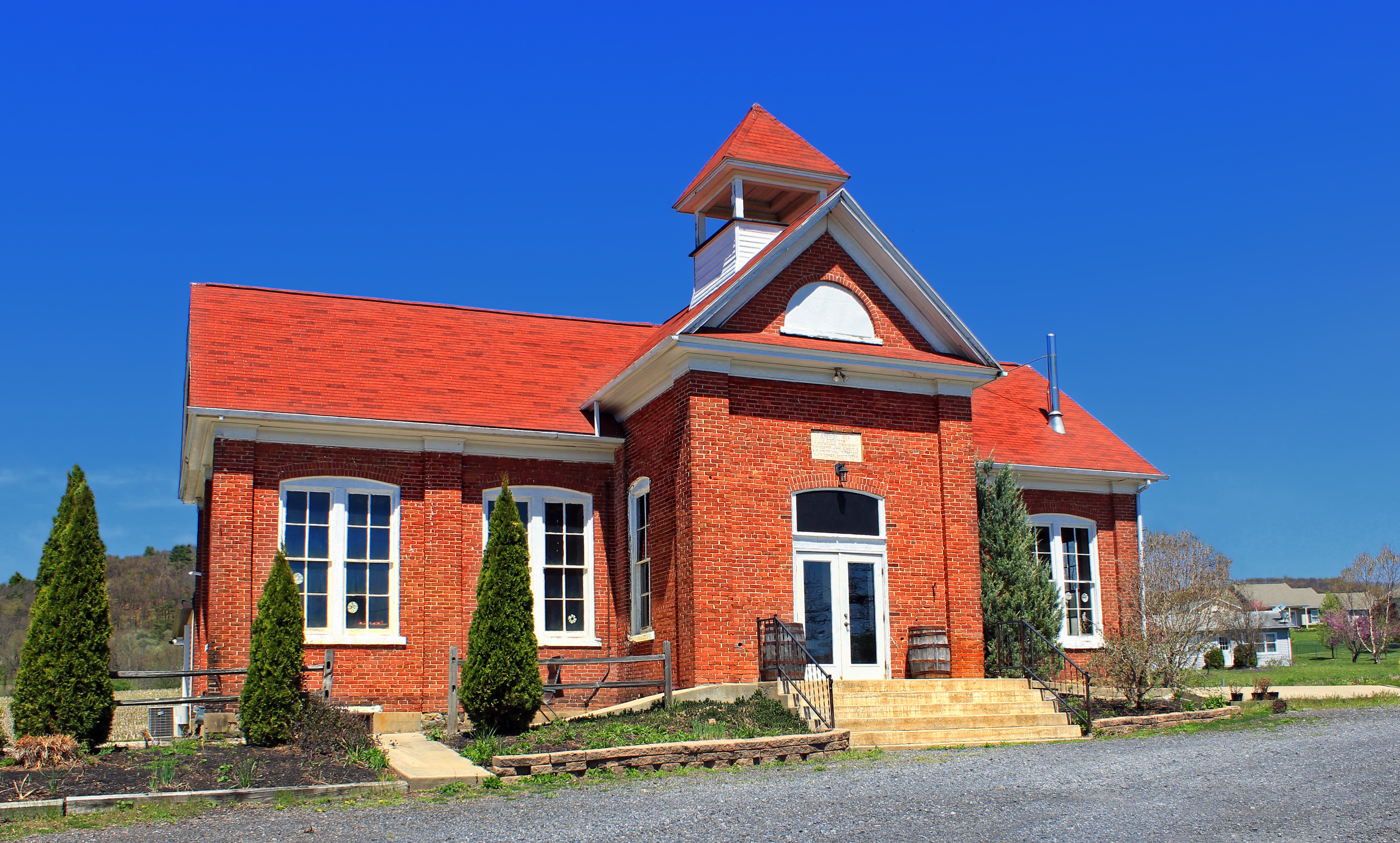
- One-room schoolhouse

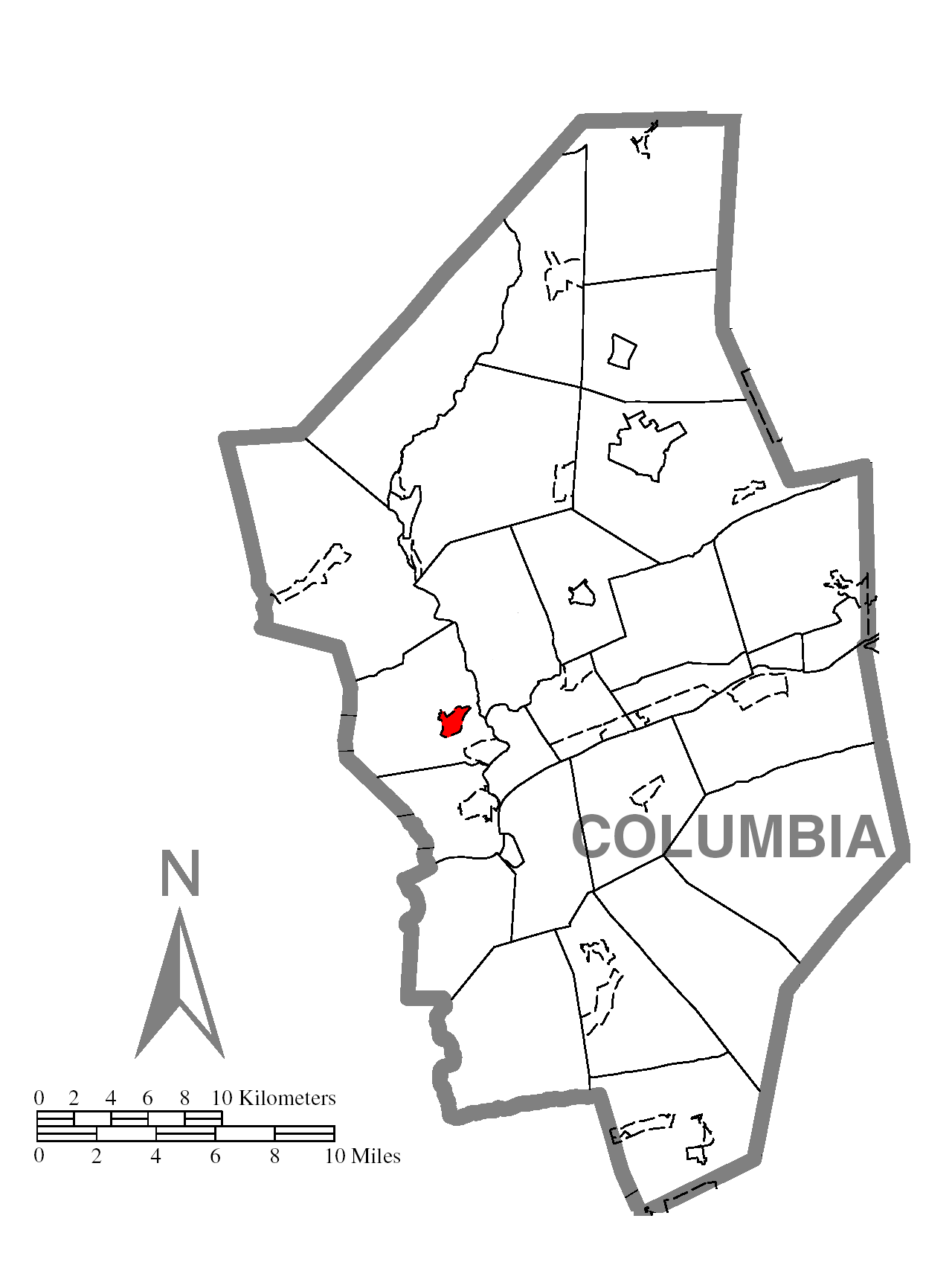
- Location within Columbia County

- Location within the U.S. state of Pennsylvania Buckhorn (the United States)
- Coordinates: 41°0′56″N 76°29′54″W
- Country: United States
- State: Pennsylvania
- County: Columbia
- Township: Hemlock

Area
  - Total: 0.68 sq mi (1.75 km^{2})
  - Land: 0.67 sq mi (1.74 km^{2})
  - Water: 0.0039 sq mi (0.01 km^{2})
- Elevation: 602 ft (183 m)

Population (2020)
  - Total: 332
  - Density: 493.7/sq mi (190.61/km^{2})
- Time zone: UTC-5 (Eastern (EST))
  - Summer (DST): UTC-4 (EDT)
- ZIP code: 17815
- Area code: 570
- FIPS code: 42-09792
- GNIS feature ID: 1192212

Buckhorn is a census-designated place (CDP) in Columbia County, Pennsylvania, United States. It is part of Northeastern Pennsylvania. The population was 332 at the 2020 census. It is part of the Bloomsburg-Berwick micropolitan area. It uses the Bloomsburg ZIP code of 17815.

== History ==
Historically, there was an Indian path leading through the Buckhorn area, and in what would become Buckhorn the path was blazed by the antlers of a deer in a white oak sapling. When the first non-native settlers arrived in the Fishing Creek valley, they created another path that intersected the Indian path, and the community came to be named for the deer antlers. The community was founded due to discovery of ore in the area. Vaniah Rees built the first house in the community in 1820. The first store in the community was opened in 1836. Mail was periodically brought to Buckhorn starting in 1850, but mail was not brought to Buckhorn on a daily basis until 1883.

== Geography ==
Buckhorn is located in western Columbia County at 41°0′56″N 76°29′54″W (41.015605, -76.498202). It is in the eastern part of Hemlock Township.

According to the United States Census Bureau, the CDP has a total area of 0.68 square miles (1.75 km^{2}), of which 0.004 square miles (0.01 km^{2}), or 0.68%, is water. It is drained by Fishing Creek into the Susquehanna River. Buckhorn is served by Pennsylvania Route 42, Pennsylvania Route 44, and Interstate 80. Buckhorn's terrain is almost entirely flat, with hills in the southern and northeastern corners. Outside the center of town, there is farmland and a golf course. The Columbia Colonnade (formerly Columbia Mall) is just outside the CDP to the east, along PA Route 42 next to its interchange with Interstate 80.

== Demographics ==
Historical population
| Census | Pop. | Note | %± |
|---|---|---|---|
| 2020 | 332 | | — |
U.S. Decennial Census

As of the census of 2000, there were 176 people, 63 households, and 45 families residing in the CDP. The population density was 288.8 inhabitants per square mile (111.5/km^{2}). There were 63 housing units at an average density of 103.4 per square mile (39.9/km^{2}). The racial makeup of the CDP was 100.00% White.

There were 63 households, out of which 30.2% had children under the age of 18 living with them, 60.3% were married couples living together, 9.5% had a female householder with no husband present, and 27.0% were non-families. 20.6% of all households were made up of individuals, and 11.1% had someone living alone who was 65 years of age or older. The average household size was 2.79 and the average family size was 3.24.

In the CDP, the population was spread out, with 27.8% under the age of 18, 6.8% from 18 to 24, 26.7% from 25 to 44, 23.3% from 45 to 64, and 15.3% who were 65 years of age or older. The median age was 36 years. For every 100 females, there were 89.2 males. For every 100 females age 18 and over, there were 98.4 males.

The median income for a household in the CDP was $27,813, and the median income for a family was $36,250. Males had a median income of $28,750 versus $21,250 for females. The per capita income for the CDP was $17,042. About 11.1% of families and 15.2% of the population were below the poverty line, including 28.0% of those under the age of eighteen and 11.1% of those sixty five or over.

== Education ==
The school district is Bloomsburg Area School District.
