= Beaver Run (Chillisquaque Creek tributary) =

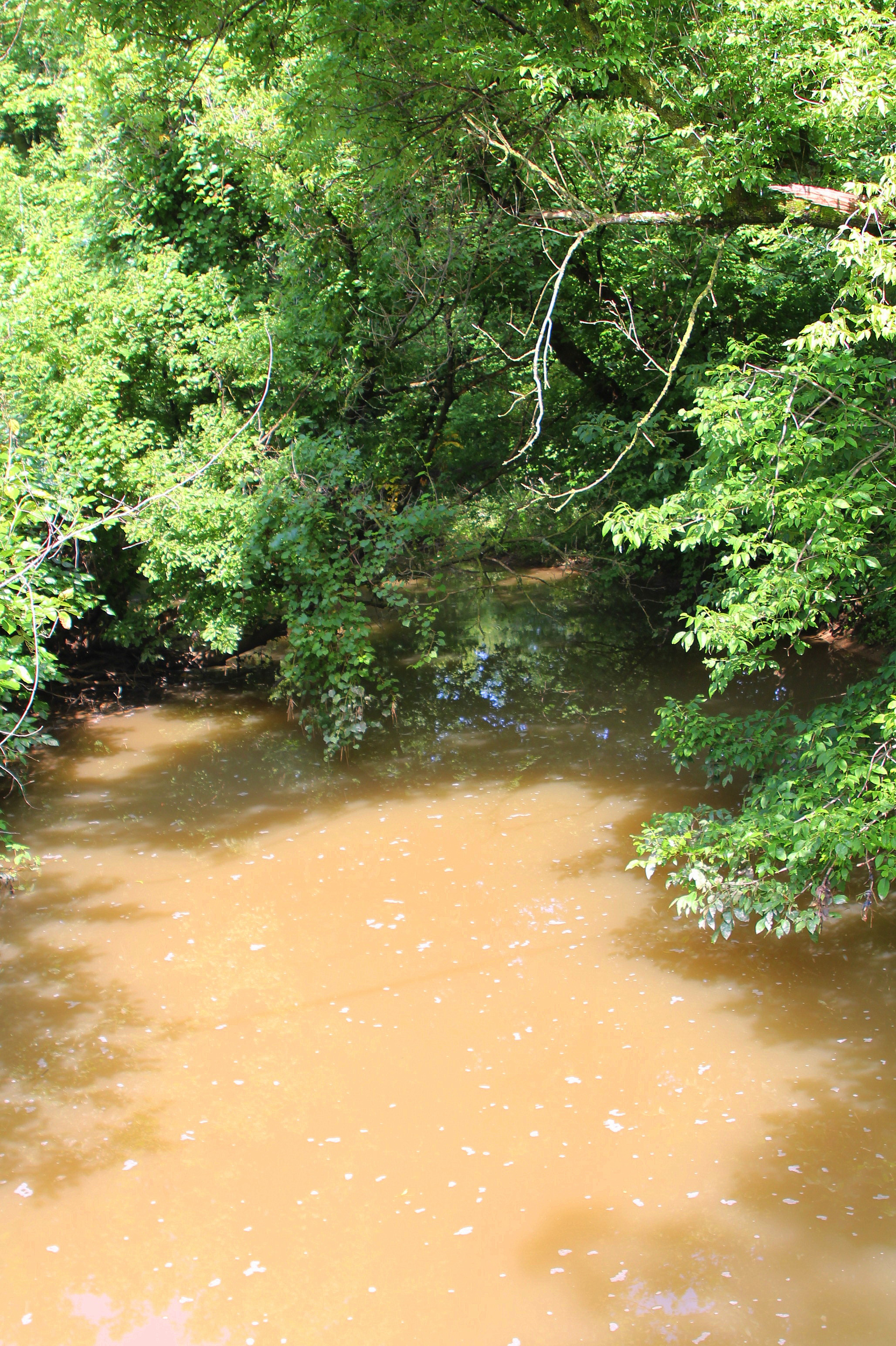
- Beaver Run looking downstream

Physical characteristics
- Source
  - location: pond in a valley on Montour Ridge in Liberty Township, Montour County, Pennsylvania
  - elevation: between 900 and 920 feet (270 and 280 m)
- Mouth
  - location: Chillisquaque Creek in East Chillisqaque Township, Northumberland County, Pennsylvania
  - coordinates: 40°59′14″N 76°46′43″W
  - elevation: 466 ft (142 m)
- Length: 6.2 mi (10.0 km)
- Basin size: 12.0 mi^{2} (31 km^{2})

Basin features
- Progression: Chillisquaque Creek → West Branch Susquehanna River

Beaver Run is a tributary of Chillisquaque Creek in Montour County and Northumberland County, in Pennsylvania, in the United States. It is approximately 6.2 miles (10.0 km) long and flows through Liberty Township in Montour County and East Chillisquaque Township in Northumberland County. The watershed of the stream has an area of 12.0 square miles (31 km^{2}). Reaches of the stream are designated as impaired due to siltation caused by agriculture. Numerous bridges have been constructed across it and it lacks a riparian buffer in some reaches.

== Course ==
Beaver Run begins in a pond in a valley on Montour Ridge in Liberty Township, Montour County. It flows west-southwest for about a mile before turning northwest, leaving behind Montour Ridge and entering a much larger valley. The stream eventually turns north and then northeast for a few tenths of a mile before turning northwest again. Some distance after crossing Pennsylvania Route 45, it begins meandering west-southwest for several tenths of a mile before turning northwest. After several tenths of a mile, the stream turns west-southwest. Several tenths of a mile further downstream, it leaves Montour County and enters East Chillisquaque Township, Northumberland County. It almost immediately reaches its confluence with Chillisquaque Creek.

Beaver Run joins Chillisquaque Creek 7.8 miles (12.6 km) upstream of its mouth.

== Geography and geology ==
The elevation near the mouth of Beaver Run is 466 feet (142 m) above sea level. The elevation of the stream's source is between 900 and 920 feet (270 and 280 m) above sea level.

The channel of Beaver Run (along with those of Chillisquaque Creek, Mauses Creek, and Kase Run) is partially created by Limestone Ridge and a range of hills running in an east-west direction through the central part of Montour County. To the south, the drainage basin of the stream is marked by Montour Ridge.

== Hydrology, watershed, and biology ==
The watershed of Beaver Run has an area of 12.0 square miles (31 km^{2}). The mouth of the stream is in the United States Geological Survey quadrangle of Northumberland. However, its source is in the quadrangle of Riverside.

There are a total of 24.6 miles (39.6 km) of streams in the watershed of Beaver Run. Of these, 12.16 miles (19.57 km), or 49.4 percent, are designated as impaired. The cause of the impairment is siltation due to agriculture. At least one person has received a permit to discharge stormwater into an unnamed tributary of the stream.

== History ==
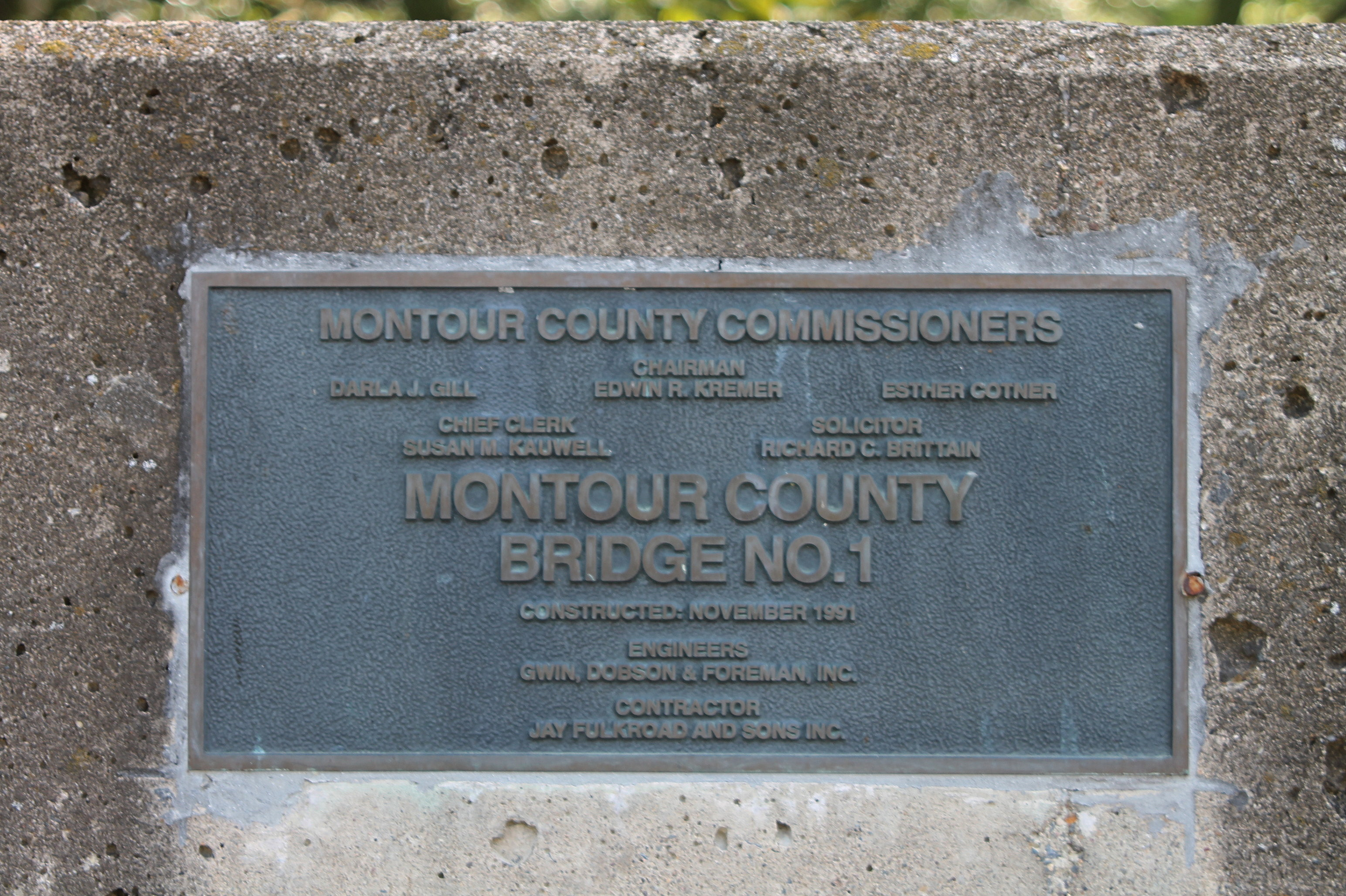
Montour County Bridge No. 1 over Beaver Run

Beaver Run was entered into the Geographic Names Information System on August 2, 1979. Its identifier in the Geographic Names Information System is 1169037.

Numerous bridges have been constructed over Beaver Run. A steel stringer/multi-beam or girder bridge carrying State Route 3003 was built over the stream in 1909 and repaired in 1973. It is 29.9 feet (9.1 m) long and is 2 miles (3.2 km) northwest of Mooresburg. A steel truss bridge carrying T-308 was built over the stream in 1912 and repaired in 1997. It is 41.0 feet (12.5 m) long and is 1.3 miles (2.1 km) east of Potts Grove. A concrete bridge was constructed over the stream in 1924 1.7 miles (2.7 km) northwest of Mooresburg. This bridge is 26.9 feet (8.2 m) long and carries T-318. A concrete slab bridge was constructed over the stream in 1941 and repaired in 2007, 2 miles (3.2 km) northwest of Mooresburg. This bridge is 24.9 feet (7.6 m) long and carries State Route 3003. A steel stringer/multi-beam or girder bridge carrying T-306 was constructed across the stream in 1991. It is 44.9 feet (13.7 m) long and is 1 mile (1.6 km) southeast of Potts Grove. A concrete culvert bridge carrying T-843 was built across the stream in the same year, is 24.0 feet (7.3 m) long, and is 1.6 miles (2.6 km) southeast of Potts Grove. In 1999, a bridge of the same type was constructed over the stream 2 miles (3.2 km) west of Mooresburg. It is 25.9 feet (7.9 m) long and carries State Route 3004.

== Biology ==
There are some areas along Beaver Run where the stream lacks a riparian buffer. According to the Montour County Natural Areas Inventory, planting native trees along the stream in these reaches would reduce nonpoint source pollution and raise water quality.

An unnamed tributary of Beaver Run is designated as a Warmwater Fishery.

== See also ==
- Mud Creek (Chillisquaque Creek), next tributary of Chillisquaque Creek going upstream
- List of rivers of Pennsylvania
