= Gottlieb Brown Covered Bridge =

- U.S. National Register of Historic Places
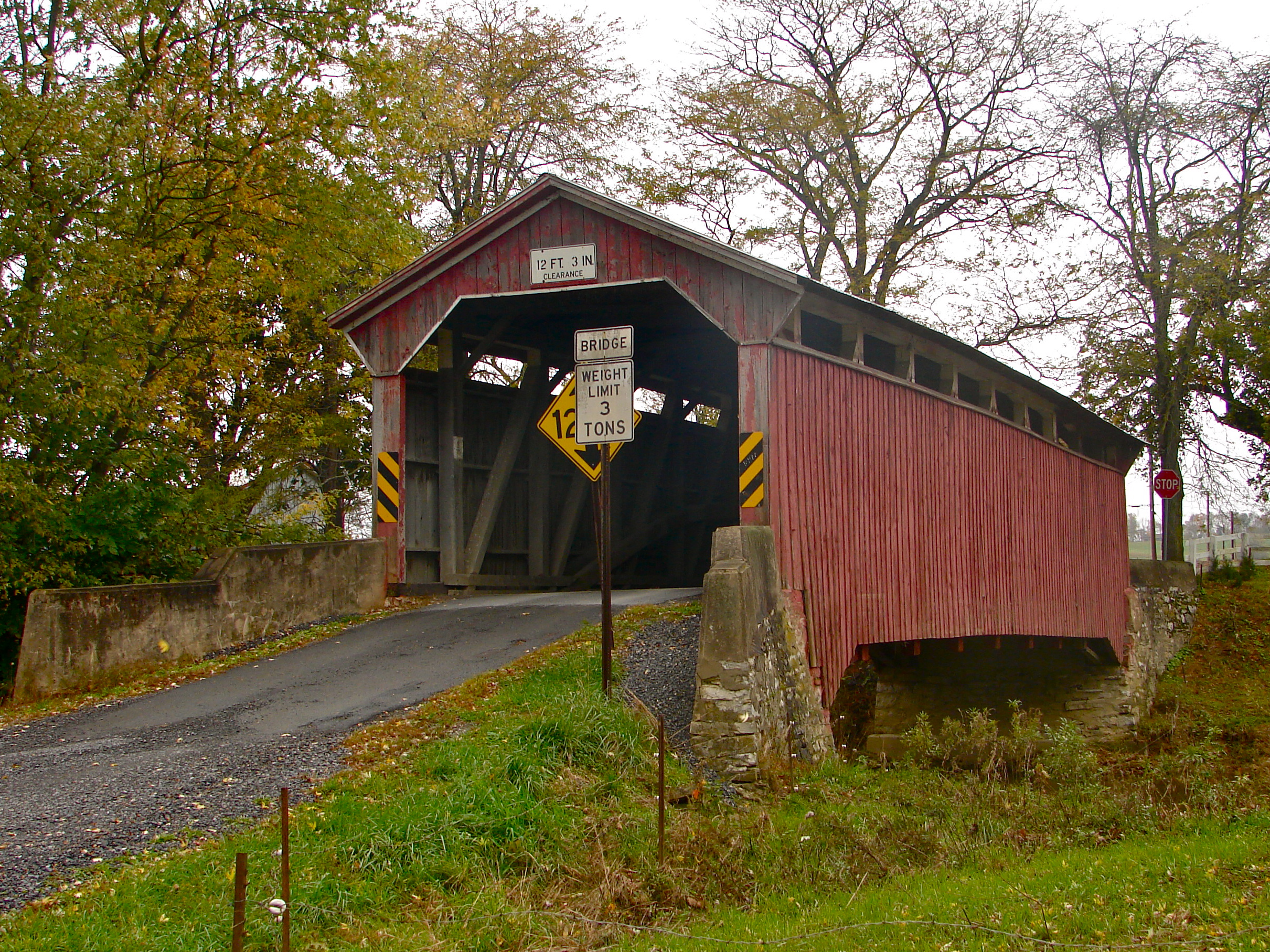
- Gottlieb Brown Covered Bridge, October 2011

- Location within Pennsylvania Location within the United States
- Location: East of Potts Grove on Township 594, Potts Grove and Mooresburg, Pennsylvania
- Coordinates: 41°0′6″N 76°46′26″W
- Area: 0.1 acres (0.040 ha)
- Built: 1881
- Architect: Keefer, George W.
- Architectural style: Burr arch
- MPS: Covered Bridges of Northumberland County TR
- NRHP reference No.: 79002311
- Added to NRHP: August 08, 1979

The Gottlieb Brown Covered Bridge, also known as the Sam Wagner Covered Bridge, is an historic wooden covered bridge in Liberty Township, Montour County, Pennsylvania, United States.

It was listed on the National Register of Historic Places in 1979.

== History and architectural features ==
Situated near Potts Grove in Montour County and East Chillisquaque Township near Mooresburg in Northumberland County, Pennsylvania, this historic structure is an 86-foot, 8 inch long, Burr Truss bridge that was built in 1881. It crosses Chillisquaque Creek.

== Gallery ==
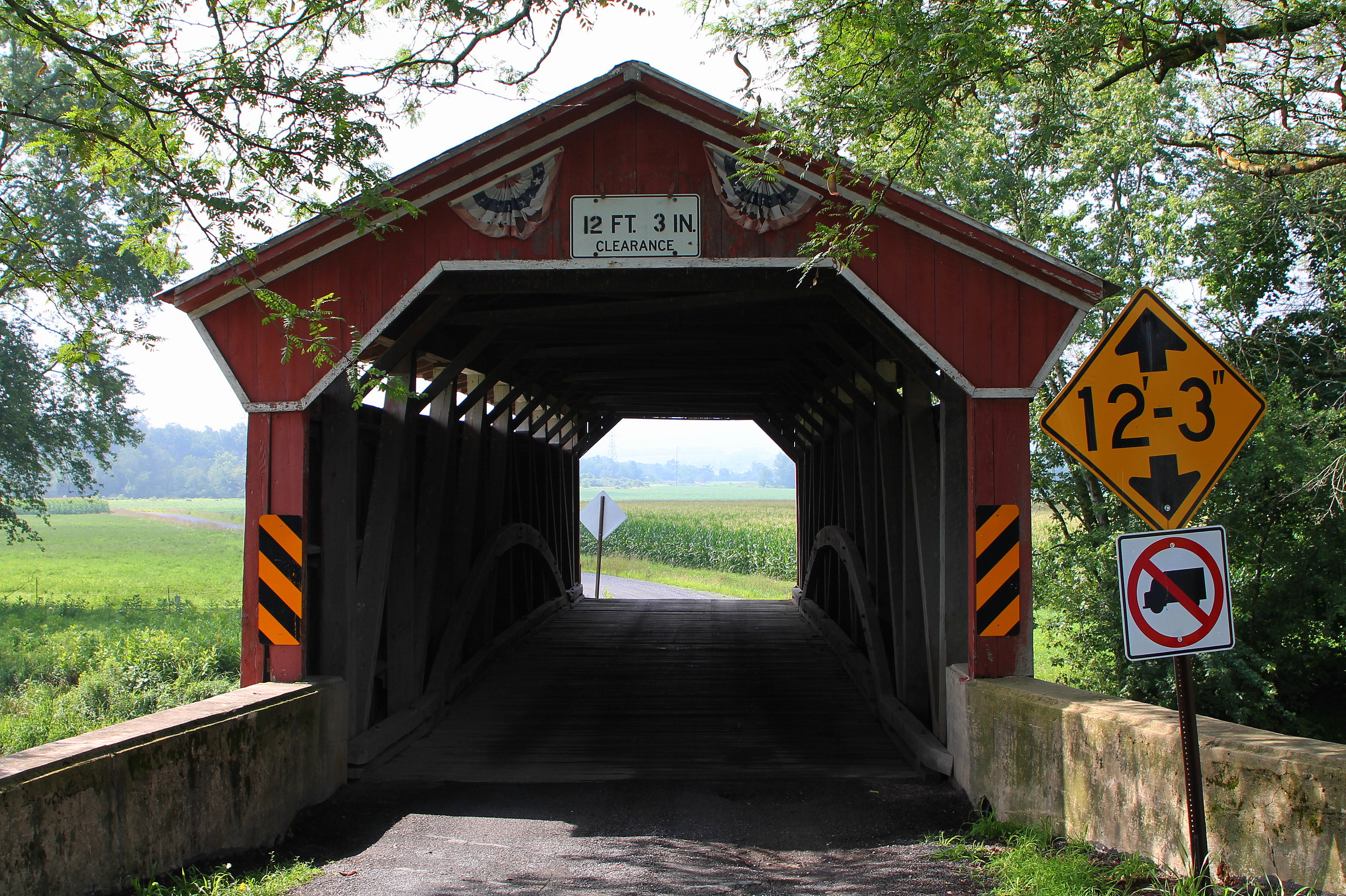
Gottlieb Brown Covered Bridge in July 2015

== See also ==
- National Register of Historic Places listings in Montour County, Pennsylvania
- National Register of Historic Places listings in Northumberland County, Pennsylvania
