= East Branch Chillisquaque Creek =

River in Pennsylvania, United States

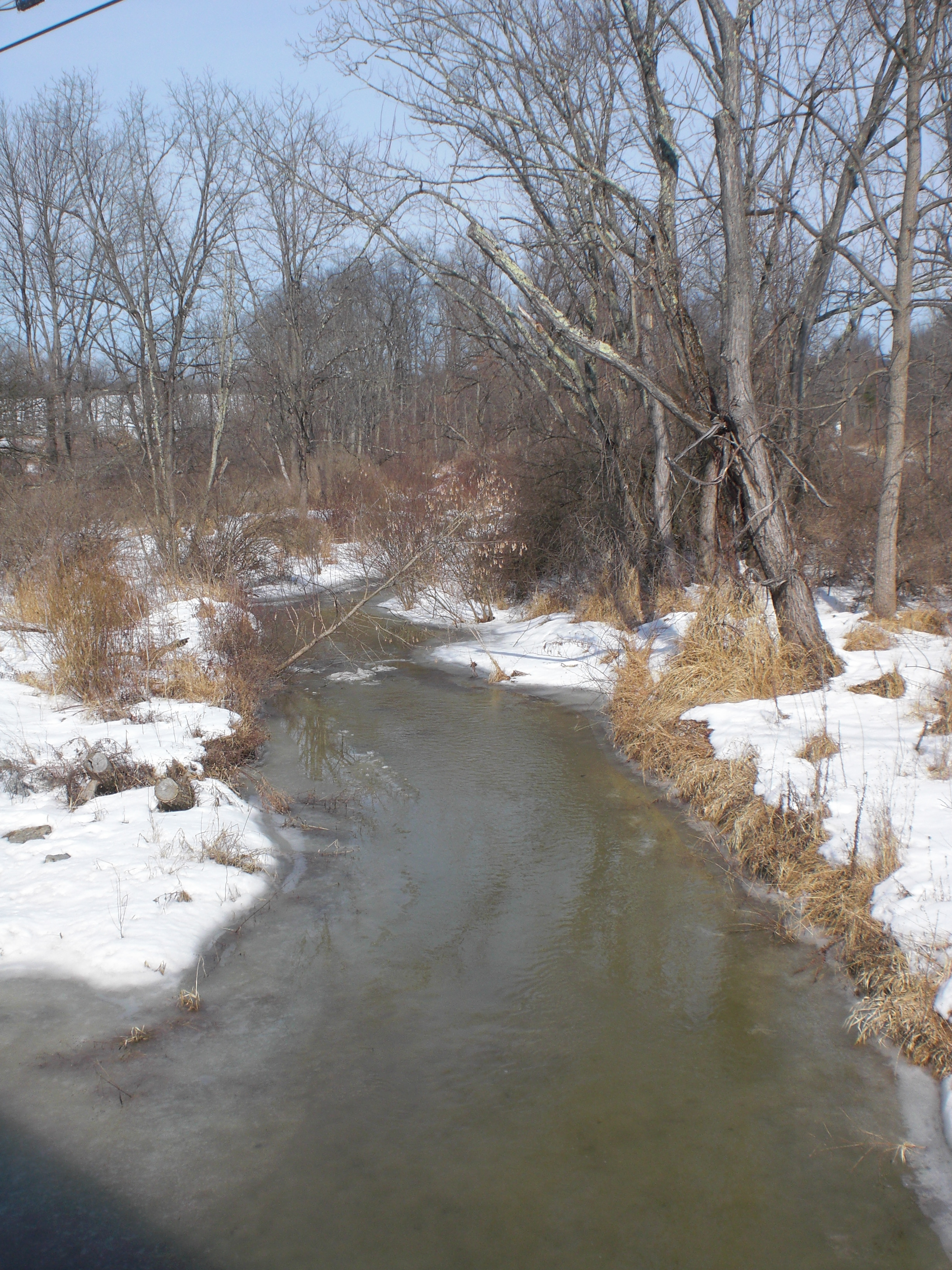
- East Branch Chillisquaque Creek about 2 miles (3.2 km) downstream of its headwaters
- Etymology: Native American word for either a "place frequented by snowbirds" or "frozen duck"

Physical characteristics
- Source
  - location: Pennsylvania State Game Lands Number 226 in Madison Township, Columbia County, Pennsylvania
- Mouth
  - location: Chillisquaque Creek in Derry Township, Montour County, Pennsylvania
  - coordinates: 41°04′55″N 76°39′53″W
  - elevation: 522 ft (159 m)
- Length: 6.2 mi (10.0 km)
- Basin size: 9.75 mi^{2} (25.3 km^{2})
- Discharge
  - average: 9.66 cu ft/s (0.274 m^{3}/s)

Basin features
- Progression: Chillisquaque Creek → West Branch Susquehanna River → Susquehanna River → Chesapeake Bay
- Tributaries
  - right: White Hall Creek

East Branch Chillisquaque Creek is a tributary of Chillisquaque Creek in Columbia County and Montour County in Pennsylvania, United States. It is approximately 6.2 miles (10.0 km) long and flows through Madison Township, Columbia County and Derry Township, Montour County. At its mouth, it combines with Middle Branch Chillisquaque Creek to form Chillisquaque Creek. White Hall Creek is a tributary of East Branch Chillisquaque Creek. The creek's watershed has an area of 9.75 square miles (25.3 km^{2}). It is situated over sandstone and shale. The main land uses in the watershed include forested land and agricultural land, although there are some areas of wetlands and open water as well.

East Branch Chillisquaque Creek experiences siltation. None of the watershed meets the water quality standards of the Pennsylvania Department of Environmental Protection. There is a stream gage on the creek at an elevation of 530 feet (160 m) above sea level.

The headwaters of East Branch Chillisquaque Creek were settled in 1775. The word chillisquaque in the creek's name means either a "place frequented by snowbirds" or "frozen duck".

== Course ==
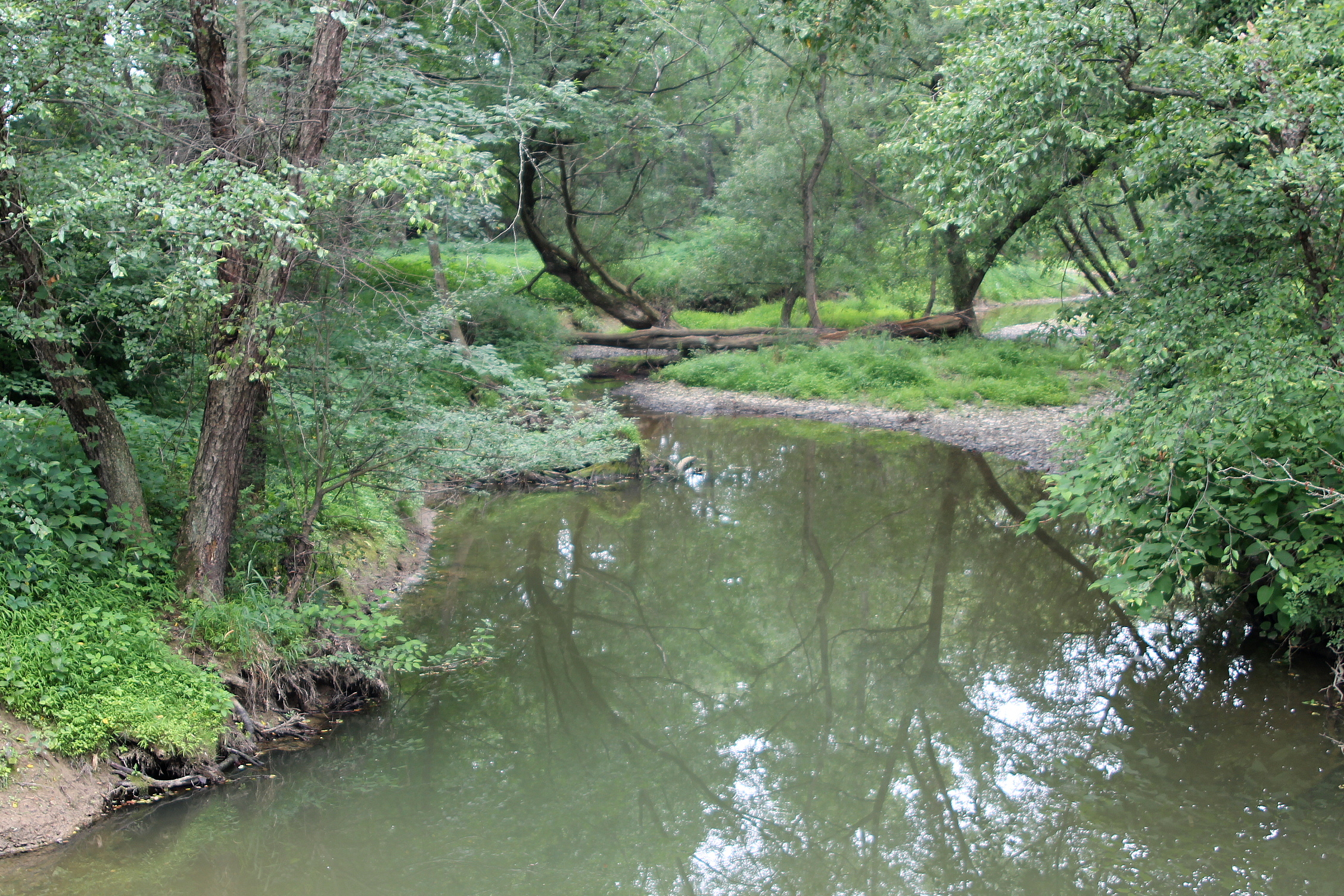
East Branch Chillisquaque Creek in the summertime

East Branch Chillisquaque Creek begins in northern Madison Township, Columbia County. Its headwaters are in Pennsylvania State Game Lands Number 226 on the southern side of the Muncy Hills. The creek heads south and very slightly west in a valley. It soon leaves Pennsylvania State Game Lands Number 226 and the valley and flows nearly due south for some distance. It then crosses Pennsylvania Route 44 and turns southwest, leaving Madison Township.

Upon leaving Madison Township, Columbia County, East Branch Chillisquaque Creek enters northern Derry Township, Montour County. In this township, the creek turns west and flows near Strawberry Ridge, flowing close to the northern border of the township. In the north-central part of the township, the creek receives its only named tributary, White Hall Creek. It then continues west, passing a gauging station and a power plant. Shortly afterwards, it meets Middle Branch Chillisquaque Creek to form Chillisquaque Creek.

The mouth of East Branch Chillisquaque Creek is near northern border of Derry Township and several miles northeast of Washingtonville. The creek's mouth is 19.96 miles (32.12 km) upstream of the mouth of Chillisquaque Creek.

=== Tributaries ===
The only named tributary of East Branch Chillisquaque Creek is White Hall Creek. It flows south through Anthony Township, Montour County to join East Branch Chillisquaque Creek in Derry Township, Montour County. White Hall Creek joins the creek 0.94 miles (1.51 km) upstream of its mouth and its watershed has an area of 2.31 square miles (6.0 km^{2}).

== Hydrology ==
Between 1961 and 1977, the annual amount of groundwater recharge ranged from 5.3 inches (13 cm) in 1963 to 26.2 inches (67 cm) in 1973, as measured by the RORA method. As measured by the PART method, the amount of groundwater recharge ranged from 4.1 inches (10 cm) in 1963 to 17.1 inches (43 cm) in 1973. On average, the months of March and December contribute the most recharge to the creek: 19.6 percent of the annual total and 15.0 percent of the annual total, respectively. The months of July and August contribute the least recharge to the creek on average: 0.4 percent of the annual total and 1.0 percent of the annual total, respectively.

The average discharge of East Branch Chillisquaque Creek at the stream gage along it is 9.66 cubic feet per second.

As of 2004, East Branch Chillisquaque Creek is impaired by sediment due to siltation. The United States Environmental Protection Agency has classified it as needing a total maximum daily load. The creek's watershed was ranked eighth for quality out of ten sub-watersheds of Chillisquaque Creek. No part of any stream in the watershed meets the water quality standards of the Pennsylvania Department of Environmental Protection.

== Geography and geology ==
The rock in the watershed of East Branch Chillisqaque Creek is includes sandstone and shale. Some of the shale near the creek in Montour County dates to the Devonian period. The Tully Beds are located at the headwaters of the creek. They consist of blue-gray limestone that is 30 to 40 feet (9.1 to 12.2 m). A number of fossils occur in these beds. These include Ambrocoelia umbonata, Spirifira zicac, and Atrypa reticularis. Two species of fossilized trilobites are found in the beds as well: Dalmanites calliteles and Phacops rana. However, no coral fossils have been found in the beds. Additionally, a rock formation known as the Genesee is found in the area.

The elevation of East Branch Chillisquaque Creek at its stream gage is 530 feet (160 m) above sea level. The elevation at the creek's mouth is 522 feet (159 m) above sea level.

There are 161 "disturbances" on East Branch Chillisquaque Creek between Pennsylvania Route 44 and the mouth of Middle Branch Chillisquaque Creek. The majority of these (122, or 75.8 percent) are sites of erosion, 64 of which are on the creek's left bank and 58 of which are on the right bank. There are also 23 gravel bars, seven bridges, five areas of riprap, three pipes, and one tributary.

There are approximately 120 separate stream banks on East Branch Chillisquaque Creek between Pennsylvania Route 44 and the mouth of Middle Branch Chillisquaque Creek. Slightly more than 60 of these banks are less than 50 feet (15 m) long. Of these, more than 55 are less than 6 feet (1.8 m) high and approximately 5 range in height from 6 to 9 feet (1.8 to 2.7 m) long. Approximately 35 of the stream banks are 51 to 100 feet (16 to 30 m) long. Approximately 30 are less than 6 feet (1.8 m) high and approximately 5 are 6 to 9 feet (1.8 to 2.7 m) high. A small number are more than 9 feet (2.7 m) high. Nearly 25 stream banks are 101 to 250 feet (31 to 76 m) long. Between 15 and 20 are less than 6 feet (1.8 m) high and approximately 5 are 6 to 9 feet (1.8 to 2.7 m) high. A small number are over 9 feet (2.7 m) high. There are also a small number of stream banks that are 251 feet (77 m) long or longer. All of these are less than 9 feet (2.7 m) high.

== Watershed ==
The watershed of East Branch Chillisquaque Creek has an area of 9.75 square miles. Upstream of the United States Geological Survey's station on the creek, the watershed's area is 9.5 square miles. The watershed is in Montour County and Columbia County. There are 18.38 miles (29.58 km) of streams in the watershed.

57.1 percent of the land in the watershed of East Branch Chillisquaque Creek is agricultural land and 41.8 percent is forested land. 0.1 percent of the land is developed and 1 percent of the land has other uses. Most of the watershed's forested land is in its upper reaches, although there are a few substantial patches in the middle and lower reaches. The watershed has some areas of wetlands and open water. Most of these are in Montour County or close to the border between Columbia County and Montour County. However, there is a wetland in the upper reaches of one of the creek's sub-watersheds. There are residential areas on the creek upstream of Pennsylvania Route 44.

The stream bed of East Branch Chillisqaque Creek is publicly owned.

== History and etymology ==
In 1775, two people from New Jersey, Daniel Welliver and Michael Billhiemer, settled in the upper reaches of East Branch Chillisquaque Creek in Madison Township, Columbia County.

A pony truss bridge was built over the lower reaches of East Branch Chillisquaque Creek in 1909. It is 49.9 feet (15.2 m) long and remains open to traffic.

The word chillisquaque in East Branch Chillisquaque Creek's name comes from either the Native American word chilisuagi, which refers to a place commonly visited by snowbirds (specifically, a "place frequented by snowbirds") or the Native American word for "frozen duck".

== See also ==
- List of rivers of Pennsylvania
- West Branch Chillisquaque Creek
- Mud Creek (Chillisquaque Creek)
