= West Branch Chillisquaque Creek =

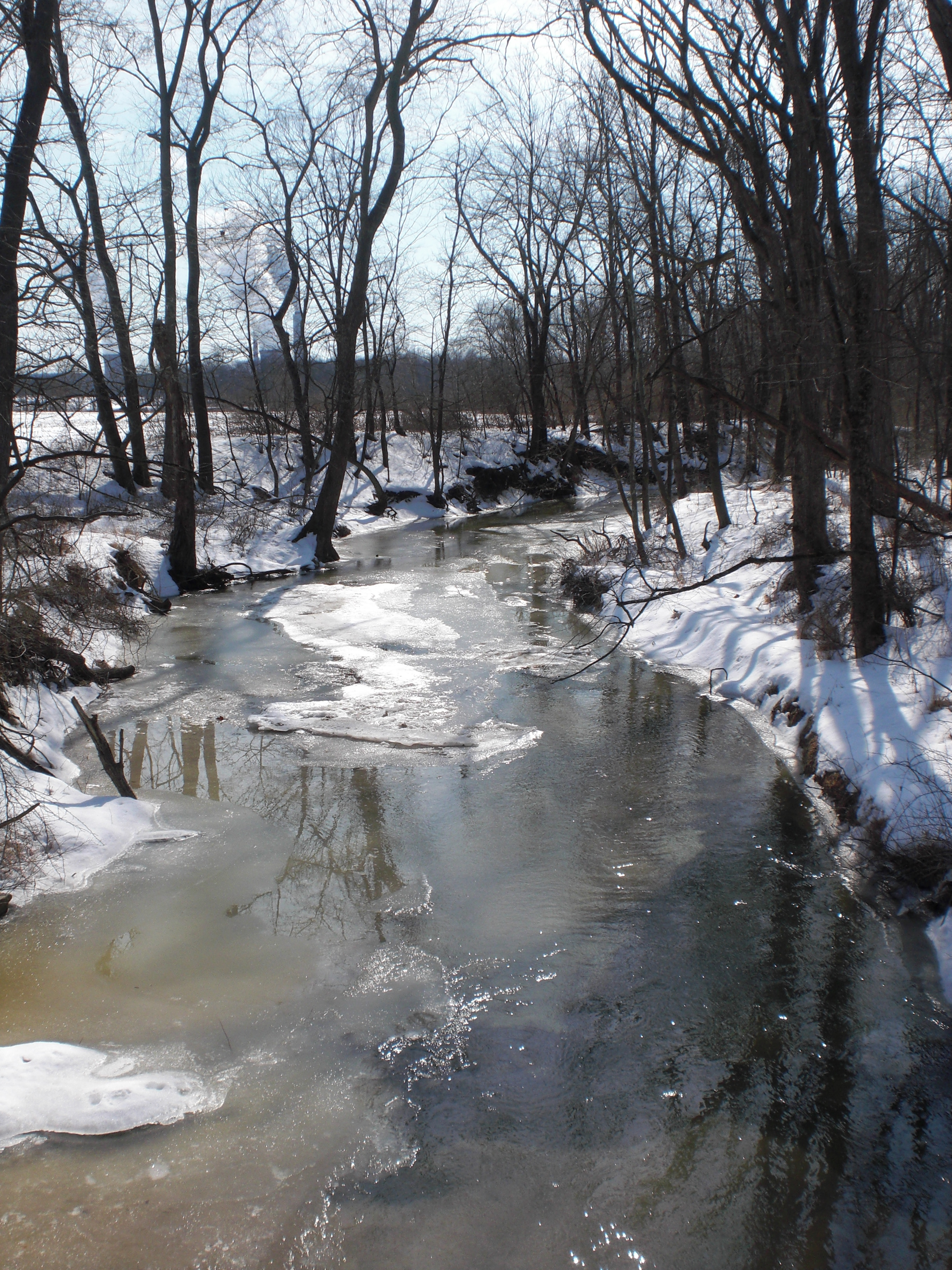
- West Branch Chillisqaque Creek in Anthony Township, Montour County

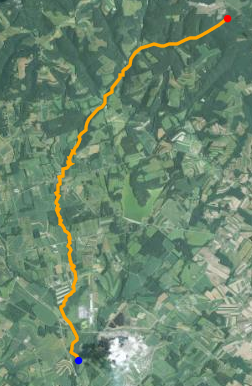
- Satellite map of West Branch Chillisquaque Creek. The red dot is the stream's source and blue dot is its mouth.
- Etymology: Native American for a place where snowbirds visit

Physical characteristics
- Source
  - location: Columbia County, Pennsylvania
- Mouth
  - location: Chillisquaque Creek
  - coordinates: 41°03′57″N 76°40′49″W
- Length: 5 mi (8.0 km)

Basin features
- Tributaries
  - right: County Line Branch

West Branch Chillisquaque Creek is a tributary of Chillisquaque Creek. Its watershed spans parts of Northumberland, Montour, Lycoming, and Columbia counties in Pennsylvania. West Branch Chillisquaque Creek is about five miles long. The creek is home to a number of tree species and herb species. There are also five main types of rock formations and four main types of soil in the creek's watershed.

== Course ==
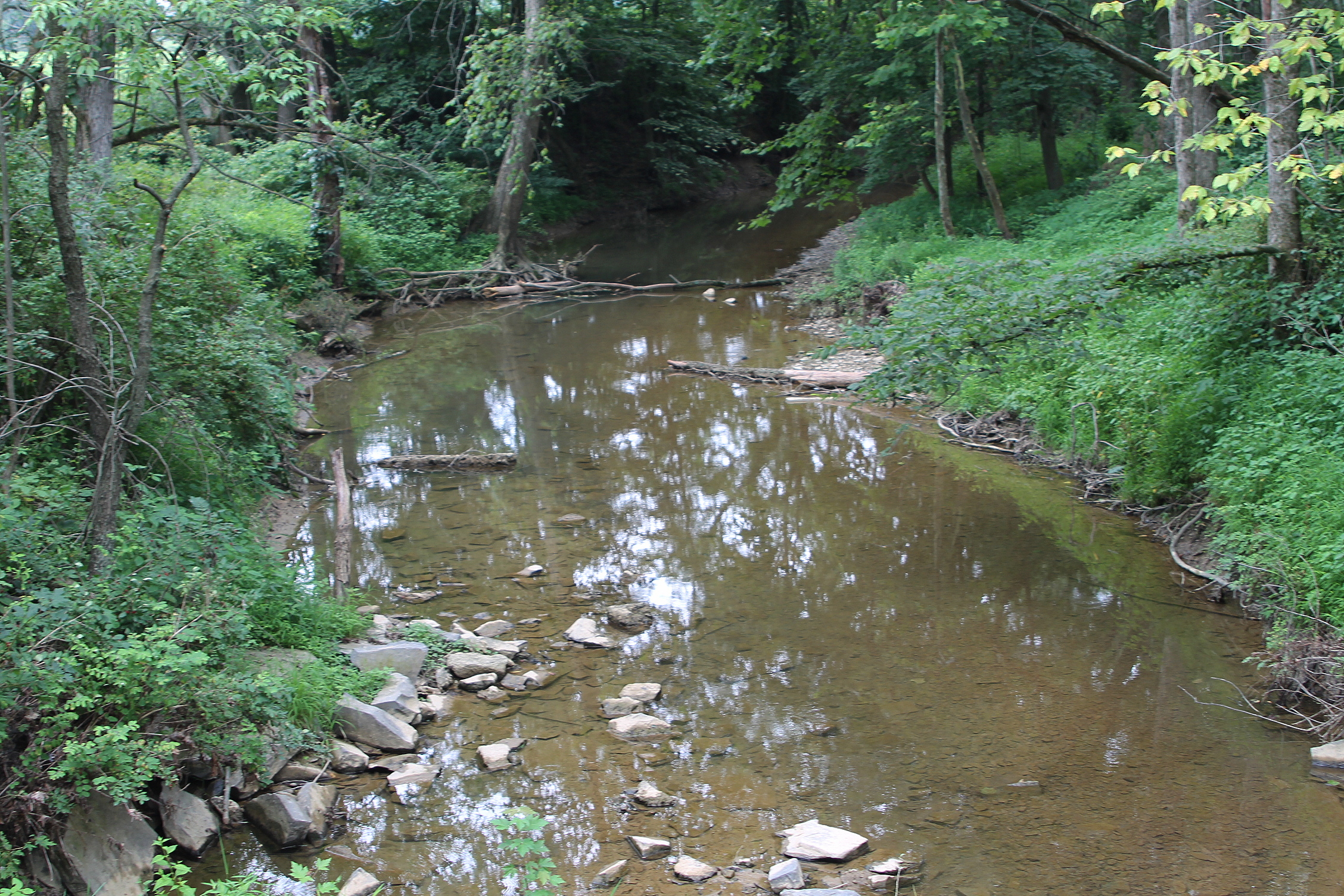
West Branch Chillisquaque Creek in the summer

West Branch Chillisquaque Creek is five to six miles (8.0 to 9.7 km) long. It starts slightly east of Anthony Township and flows west. It flows southwest for some distance before turning nearly due south and passing under Pennsylvania Route 44 on its way through the community of Exchange. West Branch Chillisquaque Creek picks up its only named tributary, County Line Branch, right at its confluence with Chillisquaque Creek. The creek empties into Chillisquaque Creek above Washingtonville.

== Geology ==
West Branch Chillisquaque Creek is situated in the Ridge-and-Valley province. The creek's headwaters are 750 feet (230 m) higher than its mouth. The watershed is highest in its northeastern area.

Ninety percent of the upper portions of the watershed of West Branch Chillisquaque Creek are over sedimentary rock. The particular rock formations that are common in this area of the watershed include the Hamilton Group, the Onondaga/Old Port formation, Trimmers Rock, and the Wills Creek Formation. The other rock formations in this section of the watershed are mostly shale and carbonate minerals. These include such formations as the Keyser/Tonoloway formation.

The Hamilton Group primarily occurs in the central portion of the watershed of West Branch Chillisquaque Creek. The Onondaga/Old Port formation primarily occurs in the southern portion of the watershed, as does the Keyser/Tonoloway formation. The Wills Creek Formation occurs in a small corner in the south-central part of the creek's watershed. The formation known as Trimmers Rock occurs in the northern portion of the watershed.

There are a number of different types of soils in the watershed of West Branch Chillisquaque Creek. The great majority of these soils are silt loams. These soils consist of the Watson-Berks-Elvira soil, the Berks-Weikert-Bedington soil, and the Hagerstown-Edom-Washington soil. There is also one non-silt loam soil that can be found in the creek's watershed. It is known as the Chenango-Pope-Holly soil.

The Watson-Berks-Elvira soil primarily occurs in the central portion of the watershed of West Branch Chillisquaque Creek. The Berks-Weikert-Bedington soil primarily occurs in the northern portion of the creek's watershed. The Hagerstown-Edom-Washington soil primarily occurs in the south-central and southwestern parts of the watershed. The Chenango-Pope-Holly soil primarily occurs in a small area of the southeastern part of the creek's watershed. The soil is highly fertile in the upper reaches of the watershed of West Branch Chillisquaque Creek.

Due to the presence of livestock near West Branch Chillisquaque Creek, parts of the creek's banks experience erosion.

== Hydrology ==
20,759 pounds (9,416 kg) of sediment and 21.2635 pounds (9.6450 kg) of phosphorus pass through the watershed of West Branch Chillisquaque Creek each day. However, there are no instances of point-source pollution in the watershed. West Branch Chillisquaque Creek is similar to Roaring Creek in many respects, such as the level of precipitation in both watersheds.

== Watershed ==
The watershed of West Branch Chillisquaque Creek has an area of 33.2 square miles (86 km^{2}). The creek and its tributaries can be accessed via a number of township roads and also via Pennsylvania Route 44 and Pennsylvania Route 54. West Branch Chillisquaque Creek's tributaries include County Line Branch, Beaver Run, and a number of tributaries that are unnamed. The land in West Branch Chillisquaque Creek's watershed consists of 58% agricultural areas, 36% forest, and 6% developed areas. The forested portions of the creek's watershed are primarily in the northern part of the watershed, while the agricultural areas are primarily in the southern and central portions of the creek's watershed. The developed areas are in small sections of the eastern part of the watershed of West Branch Chillisquaque Creek.

== History ==
The 'Chillisquaque' in West Branch Chillisquaque's name comes from a Native American word that refers to a location commonly visited by snowbirds. West Branch Chillisquaque Creek was part of a 2010 stream restoration project.

== Fauna and flora ==
There are 91.15 miles (146.69 km) of streams that have organic enrichment, sediment from agricultural projects, and a low level of dissolved oxygen. Where the creek flows past agricultural areas, its riparian buffer is severely impaired. However, at the headwaters of West Branch Chillisquaque Creek, there are northern hardwoods and hemlock forests. There are also numerous wild leeks and other spring flowers near the creek's headwaters. The hardwoods and hemlocks act like a buffer for the creek itself.

There are 12 common species of trees in the watershed of West Branch Chillisquaque Creek. There are 22 species of herbs that are common in the creek's watershed. Ovenbirds, black-throated green warblers, wood thrushes, blue-headed vireo and common yellowheads are the major species of birds in the watershed.

== See also ==
- East Branch Chillisquaque Creek
- List of rivers of Pennsylvania
- Middle Branch Chillisquaque Creek
- Mud Creek (Chillisquaque Creek)
