= Mud Creek (Chillisquaque Creek tributary) =

Tributary of Chillisquaque Creek

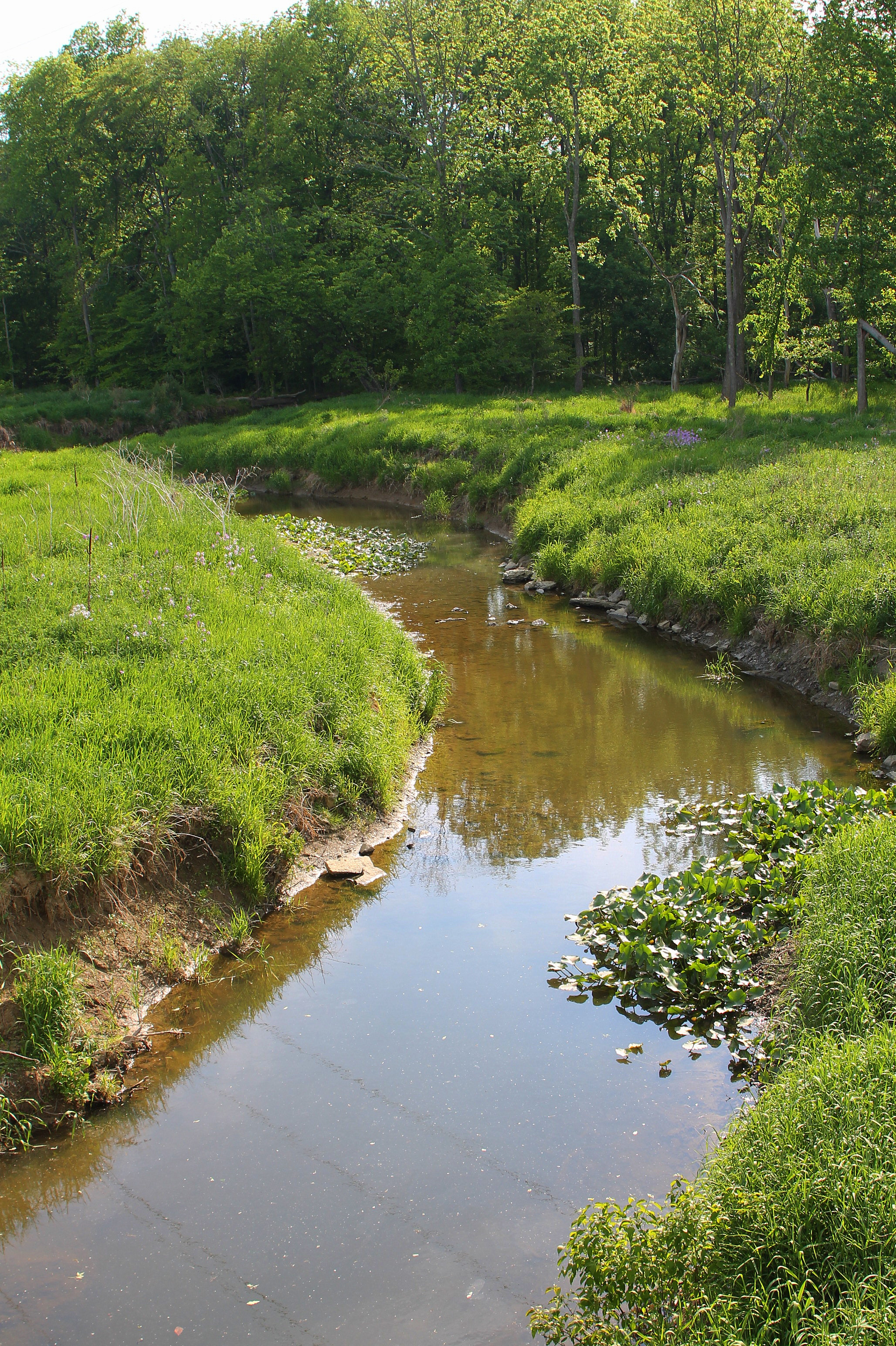
- Mud Creek looking downstream in Derry Township
- Etymology: named for its muddiness

Physical characteristics
- Source
  - location: Madison Township, Columbia County, Pennsylvania
  - elevation: 760 ft (230 m)
- Mouth
  - location: Chillisquaque Creek in Derry Township, Montour County, Pennsylvania
  - coordinates: 41°02′48″N 76°40′33″W
  - elevation: 502 ft (153 m)
- Length: 8.3 mi (13.4 km)
- Basin size: 17.70 mi^{2} (45.8 km^{2})
- Discharge
  - average: 5.8 cu ft/s (0.16 m^{3}/s)

Basin features
- Progression: Chillisquaque Creek → West Branch Susquehanna River → Susquehanna River → Chesapeake Bay

Mud Creek is a tributary of Chillisquaque Creek in Columbia County and Montour County in Pennsylvania, in the United States. It is approximately 8.3 miles (13.4 km) long and flows through Madison Township, Columbia County and Derry Township, Montour County. The main tributaries of the creek are unnamed tributaries. The creek's watershed has an area of 17.70 square miles and is in West Hemlock Township, Montour County as well as the two townships it flows through. The watershed is mostly agricultural and forested and the main developed areas are Washingtonville and Jerseytown.

As of 2011, the daily load of sediment in Mud Creek is 24,165.59 pounds (10,961.33 kg) and the daily load of phosphorus is 16.64 pounds (7.55 kg). Various other compounds and metals are also found in the creek. The main rock formations in the watershed include the Hamilton Group, the Trimmers Rock Formation, and the Onondaga and Old Port Formations. The main soil series are the Watson-Berks-Alvira series, the Chenango-Pope-Holly series, and the Berks-Weikert-Bedington series. The watershed is in the ridge and valley region of the Appalachian Mountains.

Mud Creek is named for its muddiness. An area near it was settled as early as 1772 and several bridges were built across it and its tributaries in the 20th century. The creek is designated as a warm-water fishery.

== Course ==
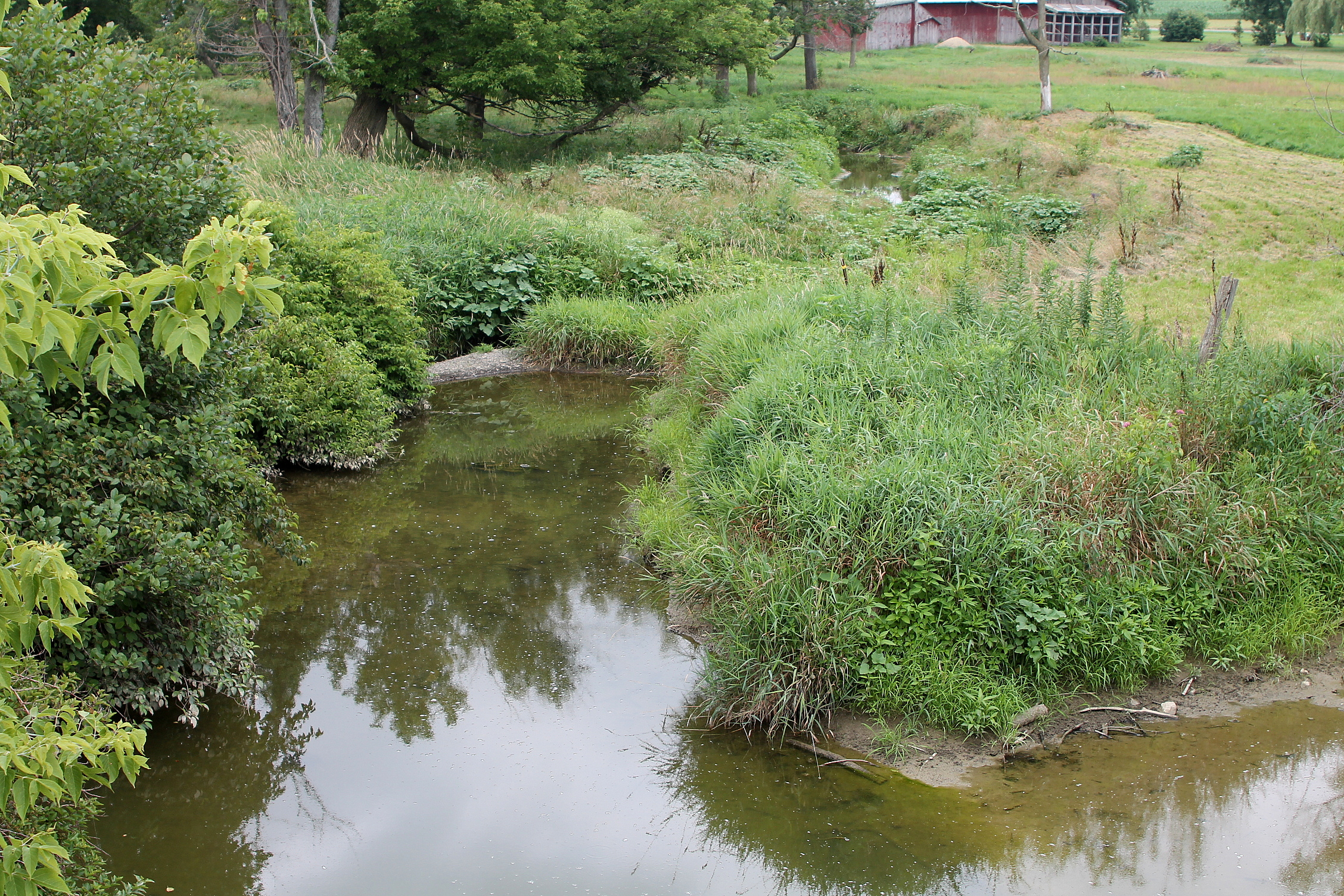
Mud Creek on the Columbia/Montour County line

Mud Creek begins in central Madison Township, Columbia County. It flows south for a short distance before turning southwest and passing through Jerseytown, where it crosses Pennsylvania Route 44. The creek then continues to flow southwest, parallel to Pennsylvania Route 254. Over the next several miles, its direction gradually changes from southwest to west and it exits Madison Township. Mud Creek then enters Derry Township, Montour County. It turns southwest again, continuing to follow Pennsylvania Route 254. Over the next few miles, the creek receives several unnamed tributaries. It then crosses Pennsylvania Route 54 and enters Chillisquaque Creek 16.79 miles (27.02 km) upstream of its mouth, immediately south of Washingtonville.

== Hydrology ==
As of 2011, a total of 54.78 miles (88.16 km) of streams in the watershed of Mud Creek were affected by organic enrichment, low concentrations of dissolved oxygen, and heavy loads of sediment. The entirety of every stream in the creek's watershed was considered by the Pennsylvania Department of Environmental Protection to be impaired as of 2011. (Note: An impaired stream is one that fails to meet the water quality standards for its designated use.)

The daily load of sediment in Mud Creek was 24,165 pounds (10,961 kg) as of 2011, but the total maximum daily load, above which water quality is considered impaired, is only 11,371.58 pounds (5,158.06 kg). The largest contributor of sediment to the creek was cropland, which contributed 19,538.46 pounds (8,862.50 kg) per day. 3,188.05 pounds (1,446.08 kg) of sediment per day came from stream banks and 1,016.05 pounds (460.87 kg) came from hay and pastures. 229.80 pounds (104.24 kg) came from land classified by the Pennsylvania Department of Environmental Protection as "transition", 115.78 pounds (52.52 kg) per day came from forest, and 77.36 pounds (35.09 kg) from land classified by the Pennsylvania Department of Environmental Protection as "low-intensity development". 0.05 pounds (0.023 kg) came from wetlands. Many of the streams in the watershed can be muddy for a number of days after thunderstorms. A United States Geological Survey report from the 1960s observed a total of 1.5 tons of dissolved solids flowing through the creek daily.

As of 2011, the load of phosphorus in Mud Creek was 16.64 pounds (7.55 kg) per day, but the total maximum daily load is 6.71 pounds (3.04 kg). 12.92 pounds (5.86 kg) per day came from cropland, 2.18 pounds (0.99 kg) from groundwater, and 1.10 pounds (0.50 kg) from hay and pastures. An average of 0.14 pounds (64 g) per day of phosphorus came from land classified by the Pennsylvania Department of Environmental Protection as "transition". 0.07 pounds (32 g) came from forest, 0.07 pounds (32 g) from land classified by the Pennsylvania Department of Environmental Protection as "low-intensity development", and 0.07 pounds (32 g) from stream banks. Septic systems contributed 0.06 pounds (27 g) of phosphorus per day to the creek and wetlands contributed 0.0002 pounds (0.091 g).

The discharge of Mud Creek ranges from 0.1 to 13 cubic feet per second and averages 5.8 cubic feet per second. Its pH ranges from 6.3 to 7.9 and the specific conductance is between 162 and 312 micro-siemens per centimeter at 25 °C (77 °F).

A United States Geological Survey report in the 1960s measured the concentration of bicarbonate in Mud Creek to range from 41 to 109 milligrams per liter, but there were no carbonates in the water. The creek's nitrate concentration ranged from 3.3 to 6.3 milligrams per liter for filtered water and the concentration of sulfates ranged from 23 to 29 milligrams per liter, again for filtered water. The concentration of chlorides in the creek's filtered waters ranged from 7 to 23 milligrams per liter. The calcium and magnesium concentrations in filtered water were 20 to 44 and 4.4 to 6 milligrams per liter, respectively.

Mud Creek experiences nonpoint source pollution. The Montour County Natural Areas Inventory recommended remedying this pollution.

== Geography, geology, and climate ==
The elevation near the mouth of Mud Creek is 502 feet (153 m) above sea level. The elevation of the creek's source is approximately 760 feet (230 m) above sea level. The highest areas of the watershed are in its southeastern portion. The watershed of Mud Creek is in the ridge and valley physiographic region of the Appalachian Mountains.

The main rock type in the watershed is shale, mainly that of the Hamilton Group. Siltstone and sandstone are also found in the watershed, in the Trimmers Rock Formation and the Onondaga and Old Port Formations. The Trimmers Rock Formation occurs on the southern side of the watershed and also in the northeastern corner of it. The Onondaga and Old Port Formations occur in the lowest reaches of the watershed and the Hamilton Group occurs everywhere else. 80 percent of the watershed's rock is of the Hamilton Group, 15 percent is of the Trimmers Rock Formation, and 5 percent is of the Onondaga and Old Port Formations.

The Lower Helderberg Limestone occurs a small distance north of Mud Creek, where it is quarried. It is a flaggy and blue-colored limestone that is 15 feet (4.6 m) thick and dips at an angle of six to eight degrees. There are small pieces of the Oriskany sandstone close to the confluence of the creek with Chillisquaque Creek.

The most common soil series in the watershed of Mud Creek is the Watson-Berks-Alvira series. It is a shaly silt loam that mostly occurs in the watershed's plains and highlands. Other soil series in the watershed include the Berks-Weikert-Bedington series and the Chenango-Pope-Holly series. The Chenango-Pope-Holly occupies areas near the creek itself in its lower reaches and the Berks-Weikert-Bedington series occurs throughout most of the southern edge of the watershed. All other parts of the watershed lie over soil of the Berks-Weikert-Bedington series. 80 percent of the soil is of the Watson-Berks-Alvira series, 12 percent is of the Berks-Weikert-Bedington series, and 8 percent is of the Chenango-Pope-Holly series. The Holly-Monogahela-Basher soil association is found in the floodplain of the creek.

On average, 44.5 inches (113 cm) of precipitation fall in the watershed of Mud Creek annually. The annual level of runoff in the watershed is 0.13 inches (0.33 cm) on average.

== Watershed ==
The watershed of Mud Creek has an area of 17.70 square miles. It is mainly in Madison Township, Columbia County and Derry Township, Montour County, but a small part of it is in West Hemlock Township, Montour County. The watershed of the creek is in the Washingtonville and Millville United States Geological Survey 7.5 minute quadrangles. It is on the eastern edge of the West Branch Susquehanna River watershed. The creek's major tributaries include several unnamed tributaries.

The main land use in the watershed of Mud Creek is agricultural land, which accounts for 62.97 percent of the total area. 31.49 percent of the watershed is forested and 5.54 percent is developed land. Most of the forested land is on the watershed's southern and eastern edges, but there are some patches of it elsewhere, most of which are fairly small. Most of the developed land is near Jerseytown and Washingtonville, but there are several other small areas of development in the watershed's lower reaches and a few other areas in its upper reaches.

The major communities in the Mud Creek watershed are Jerseytown and Washingtonville. Major roads in the watershed include Pennsylvania Route 254. There are also a number of township roads that go to the creek and its tributaries.

== History and etymology ==
An early settler in the area was George Whitmoyer, who built a cabin in the valley of Mud Creek at Jerseytown in 1772. The Mud Creek Bridge was built over Mud Creek in 1907. It is a Pratt pony truss bridge that was built in 1907 and is 40 feet (12 m). The bridge is near to collapse and is closed to traffic. Another eight bridges also cross the creek. Four were built in the 1930s, one in 1946, two in 1962, and the most recent in 1984. An additional four bridges were built over its tributaries in the 1940s.

John Gosse Freeze gives the name Mud Creek as the east branch of Chillisquaque Creek in his 1888 book A History of Columbia County, Pennsylvania: From the Earliest Times, but adds that the creek's name is more correctly the East Branch of the Chillisquaque. Mud Creek is named for its muddiness, which is especially pronounced following storms.

== Biology ==
There are few or no riparian buffers along Mud Creek where it flows through agricultural land. However, the Montour County Natural Areas Inventory has recommended restoring the riparian buffers in Derry Township. A wet meadow is located along the creek north of Washingtonville. Plant types typically found in wet meadows include various ferns, sedges, grasses, and red maples. Mud Creek is designated as a warm-water fishery.

== See also ==
- Beaver Run (Chillisquaque Creek), next tributary of Chillisquaque Creek going downstream
- West Branch Chillisquaque Creek, next tributary of Chillisquaque Creek going upstream
- List of rivers of Pennsylvania
