= Rishel Covered Bridge =

- U.S. National Register of Historic Places
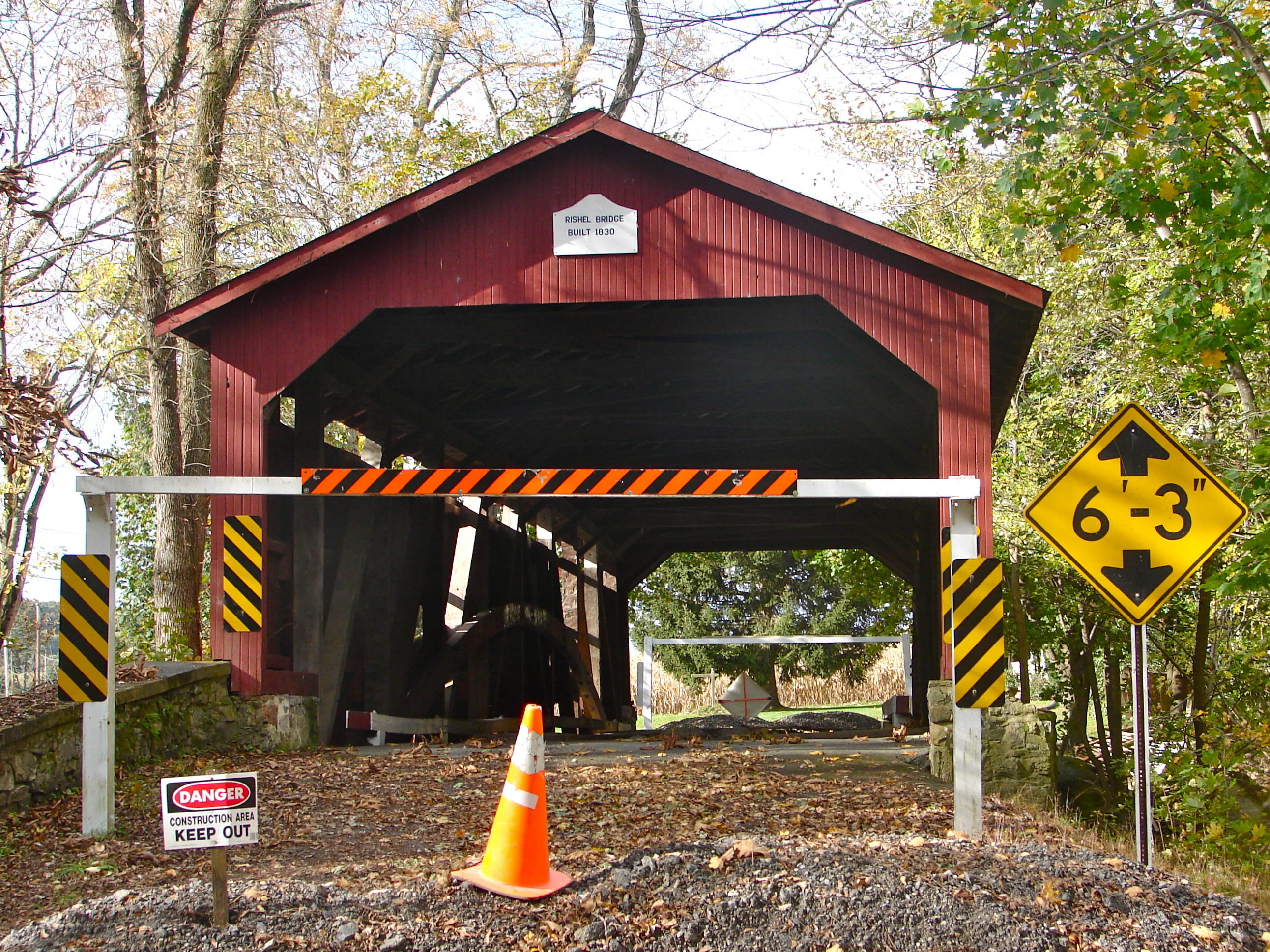
- Rishel Covered Bridge, October 2011

- Location within Pennsylvania Location within the United States
- Location: East of Montandon on Township 573, East Chillisquaque Township and West Chillisquaque Township, Pennsylvania
- Coordinates: 40°57′37″N 76°48′58″W
- Area: 0.1 acres (0.040 ha)
- Built: 1830
- Built by: John Shriner Jr., Zacheus Braley
- Architectural style: Burr arch
- MPS: Covered Bridges of Northumberland County TR
- NRHP reference No.: 79002310
- Added to NRHP: August 8, 1979

Rishel Covered Bridge is a historic wooden covered bridge located at East Chillisquaque Township and West Chillisquaque Township in Northumberland County, Pennsylvania. It is a single span, 110.16-foot-long (33.58 m), Burr Truss bridge, constructed in 1830. It crosses the Chillisquaque Creek. It may be the oldest covered wooden bridge in the United States.

It was listed on the National Register of Historic Places in 1979.
