= Fort Bosley =

Fort in the Susquehanna Valley frontier

Coordinates: 41.0486°N 76.6747°W

Fort Bosley was a fort fortified in 1777 around a grist mill built in 1773 by John Bosley, in the Susquehanna Valley frontier near present-day Washingtonville in what is now Montour County. It was one of roughly a dozen frontier forts developed along the Susquehanna Valley during the American Revolutionary War to protect settlers and support Fort Augusta, and it was the only such fortification located within present-day Montour County.

Although it was never garrisoned by more than twenty troops and has no known record of an enemy attack, the fort provided refuge to nearby settlers during periods of anticipated raids, including the family of John Eves following the Wyoming Valley Massacre. Fort Bosley was last garrisoned in 1780, after which Bosley's Mill continued to operate until it burned down in 1826. The Pennsylvania Historical and Museum Commission placed a historical marker at the site in 1947.

== History ==
With the signing of the Treaty of Fort Stanwix (1768) between Great Britain and the Iroquois, permanent European settlement began to occur throughout much of present-day Pennsylvania, including the Susquehanna Valley. One of the first settlers near present-day Washingtonville was John Bosley who had moved to the area with slaves from Maryland.

Bosley built a grist mill along the eastern banks of Chillisquaque Creek near its convergence with Mud Run in 1773 (although the Commonwealth of Pennsylvania recognizes the Borough of Washingtonville's settlement as 1775). With the large area of fine arable land along the Chillisquaque between the Muncy Hills to the north and Washingtonville Hill to the south, Bosley's Mill became a necessity for settling farmers of the immediate area.

Despite authorized European settlement throughout the Susquehanna Valley, hostilities with natives of the area were commonplace. The magnitude of these tensions only intensified after the outbreak of the Revolutionary War. Following the defeat of General George Washington at the Battle of Brandywine, the decision was made to develop a system of forts along the Susquehanna Valley frontier to protect settlers and support the greater defense of Fort Augusta at present day Sunbury. Almost all of these frontier forts, roughly a dozen in the immediate Susquehanna Valley region, were developed either along the north or west branches of the Susquehanna River. Bosley's Mill, which was fortified in 1777, was one of the few protected locations off of the two river branches.

This remotely located mill formed the nucleus of a larger fort which had portholes in its walls and for a while, a small howitzer mounted within its enclosure. In times of an anticipated raid, the settlers of the valley surrounding Chillisquaque Creek fled to this fortification for protection. Fort Bosley as it became called, was the only fortified location in Montour County, Pennsylvania during the Revolutionary War(3). Records from the 19th century have also listed this fortification as “Brady’s Fort” and “Boyle’s Fort.”

In 1779, the more heavily manned Fort Freeland between present day Watsontown and Turbotville fell to a substantial force composed of British Loyalists and a few hundred native allies, led by some British regular army officers (whom took the occupants and garrison of Fort Freeland prisoner). The garrison of Fort Rice (in Turbot Township), between Fort Freeland and Fort Bosley, heard the gunfire at Fort Freeland and responded on foot and skirmished with the British and native force present. As the British officers wrongfully concluded that they were now skirmishing with an advance force from Fort Augusta and that the Colonial regiment posted there was enroute, they set fire to Fort Freeland and conducted a tactical retreat, despite only skirmishing with a 10 man garrison from fort Rice. Following the battle of Fort Freeland, Boone's Fort between Milton, Pennsylvania and Watsontown were subsequently deserted during what was called "The Great Runaway" in which colonists of the area were fearful of a larger British offensive. Despite the collapse of these other nearby fortifications (evacuation of Fort Boone and the loss of Fort Freeland in battle), Fort Bosley never had a garrison of more than twenty troops. The fall of these two nearby installations, a lack of militiamen to defend Fort Bosley and Fort Rice, their remote locations, and scarcity of provisions made these forts particularly susceptible to an attack.

Additionally, two traveled Indian paths existed in the immediate area. The first trail led from the Wyoming Valley to Muncy. The original course of this path in present-day Montour County never diverged more than half a mile away from the current railroad line that travels through Strawberry Ridge and Talen Energy’s Montour Power Station. The second trail, known as the Muncy-Mahoning path, roughly followed Mahoning Creek near present day Danville, north passed Washingtonville and the Montour Preserve, before ending in Muncy.

Despite its vulnerabilities, there are no known records of any attacks on Fort Bosley. Notably, the fort was able to successfully provide security to the family of John Eves (the founders of nearby Millville, Pennsylvania) following the Wyoming Valley Massacre. Although the fort was last garrisoned in 1780 under the command of a Captain Kemplon, the installation remained valuable as a grist mill following the American Revolution.

A great famine is said to have taken place in the immediate area in 1788. Phillip Maus, founder of present day Mausdale, Pennsylvania and one of Montour County’s first permanent European settlers, purchased grain from Paradise farm near Watsontown and had it delivered to Bosley’s Mill during this time of hardship. From records possessed by Phillip Maus, there is reference that settlers who had homes in the immediate vicinity of Bosley’s Mill were also able to obtain the grain delivered from Paradise farm. At the time, the area surrounding the mill had already become to be known as “Washington” (which later became known as Washingtonville).

John Bosley would eventually sell his mill, along with its surrounding land in 1795. He and his wife Susannah then moved to upstate New York where John would die in 1800. Bosley's Mill, which played a critical role both as the nucleus of the fort that defended the Chillisquaque Creek valley as well as for the development of present-day Washingtonville, burned down in 1826. No evidence of the mill exists today although the Pennsylvania Historical and Museum Commission dedicated a marker along Route 54 to commemorate the mill's time as a fort on May 12, 1947.
