= East Chillisquaque Township, Northumberland County, Pennsylvania =

Township in Pennsylvania, US

Coordinates: 40°59′00″N 76°47′59″W

East Chillisquaque Township, Pennsylvania
- Township
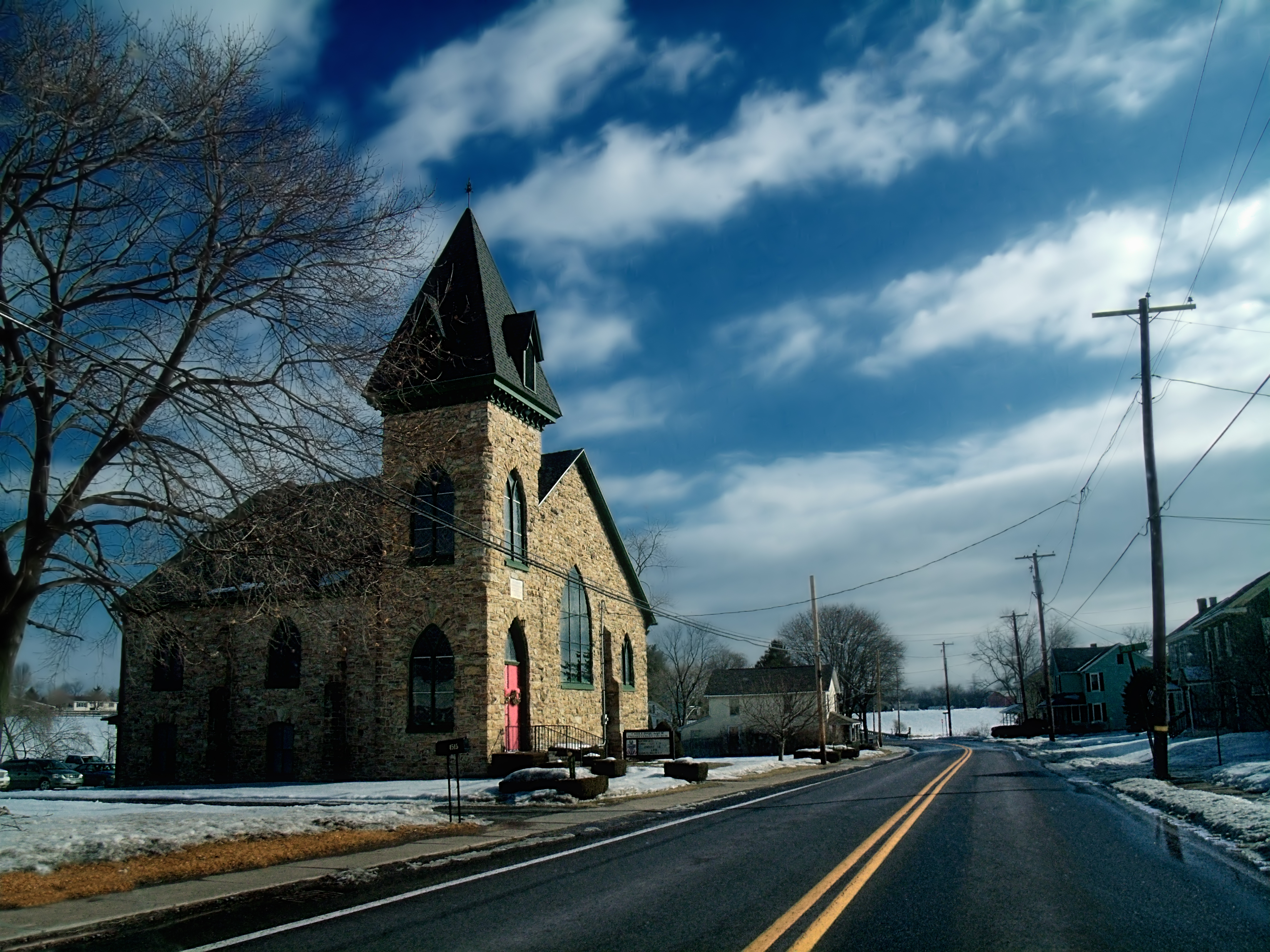
- Chillisquaque Presbyterian and Pottsgrove in the township

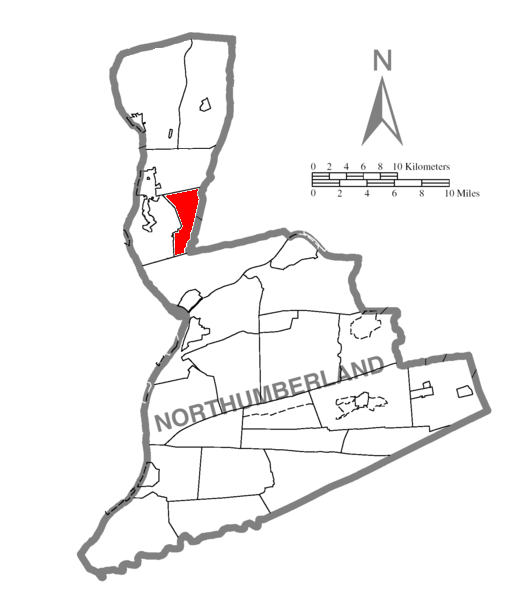
- Map of Northumberland County, Pennsylvania highlighting East Chillisquaque Township

- Map of Northumberland County, Pennsylvania
- Country: United States
- State: Pennsylvania
- County: Northumberland
- Settled: 1769

Government
  - Type: Board of Supervisors

Area
  - Total: 8.07 sq mi (20.91 km^{2})
  - Land: 8.03 sq mi (20.79 km^{2})
  - Water: 0.046 sq mi (0.12 km^{2})

Population (2020)
  - Total: 676
  - Density: 84.2/sq mi (32.52/km^{2})
- Time zone: UTC-5 (Eastern (EST))
  - Summer (DST): UTC-4 (EDT)
- ZIP code: 17847
- Area code: 570
- FIPS code: 42-097-20976

East Chillisquaque Township is a township in Northumberland County, Pennsylvania, United States. The population was 676 at the 2020 census, up from 668 at the 2010 census.

== History ==
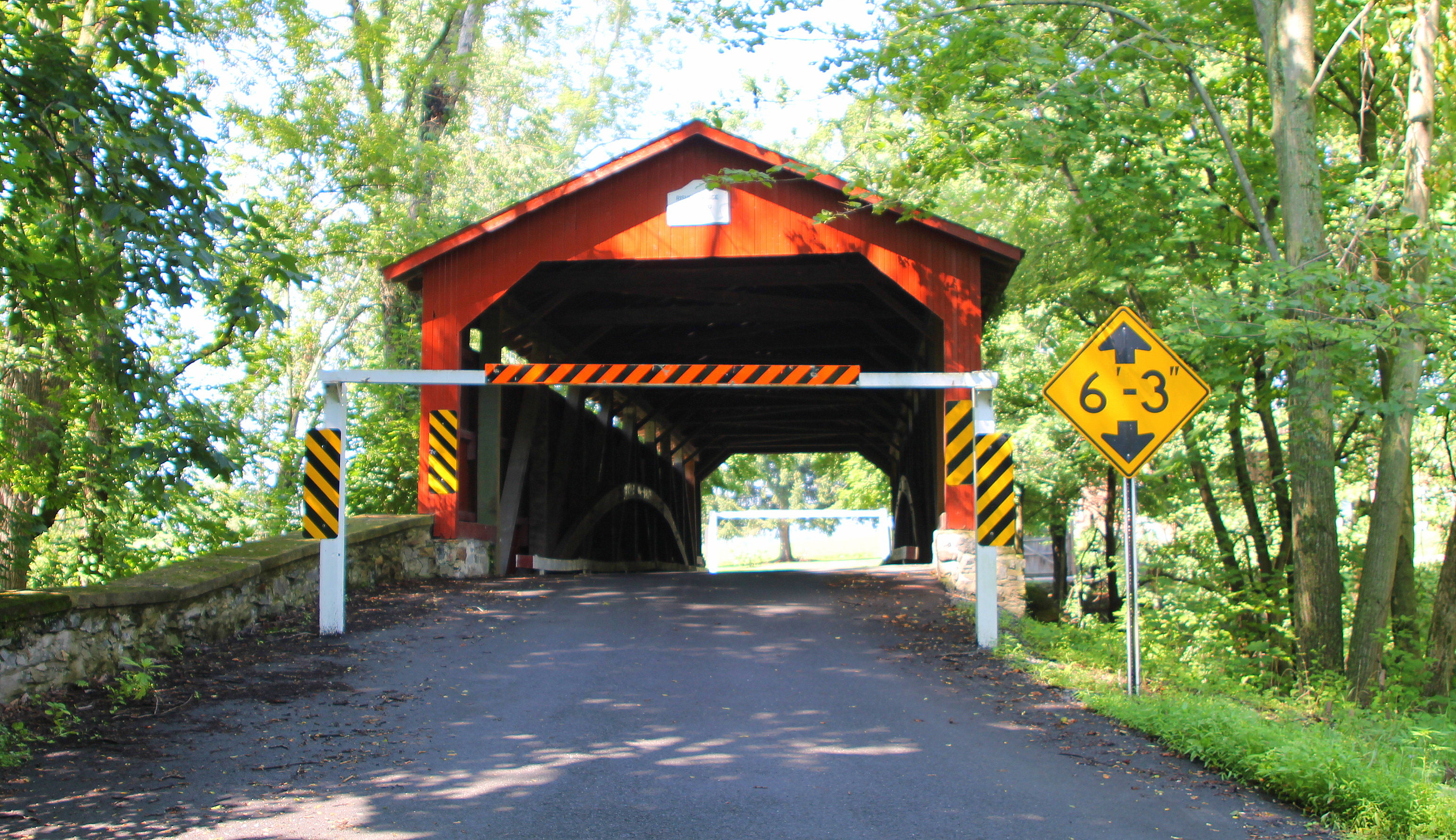
The Rishel Covered Bridge in July 2015.

The Rishel Covered Bridge and Gottlieb Brown Covered Bridge are listed on the National Register of Historic Places.

== Geography ==
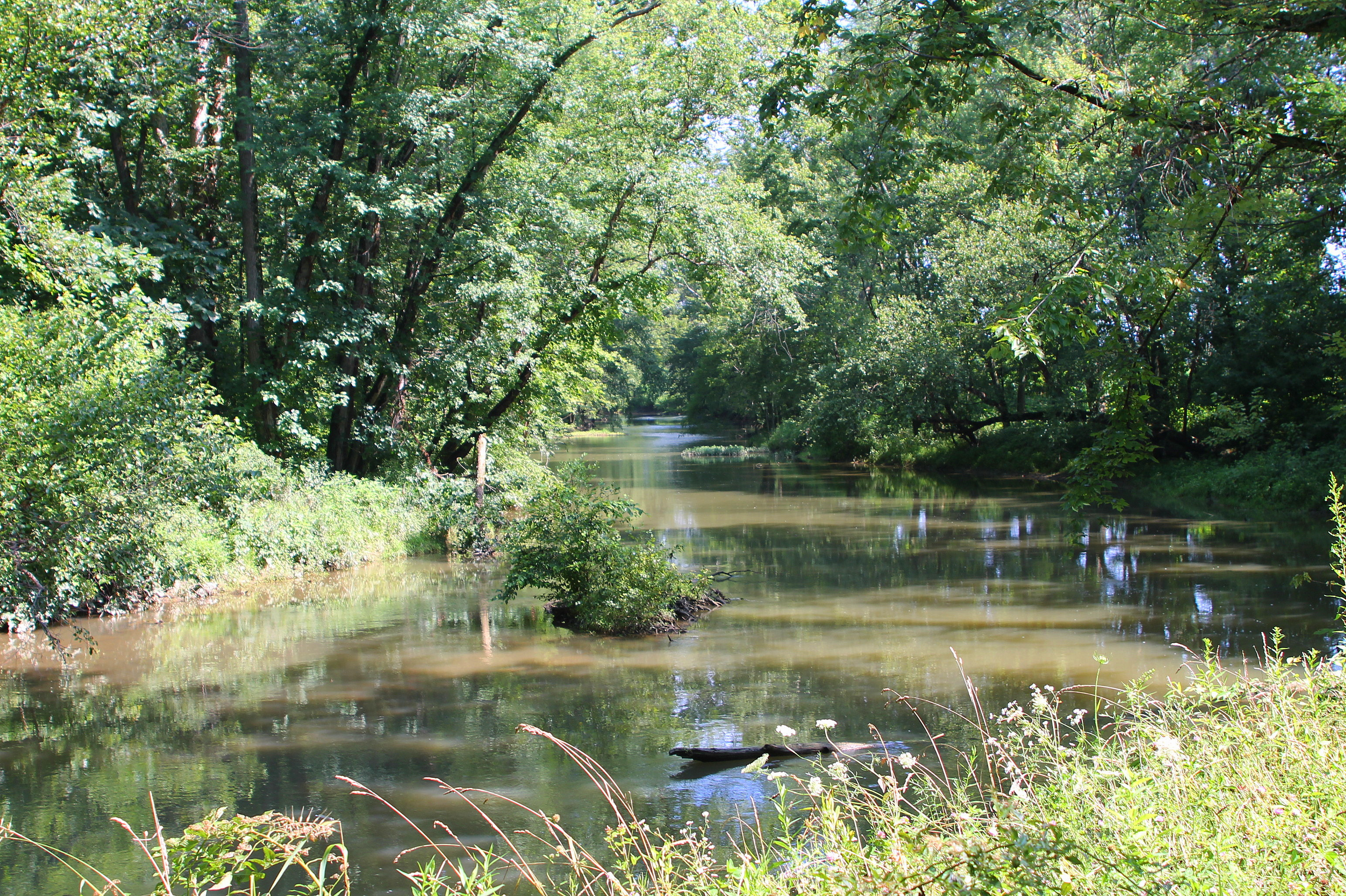
Chillisquaque Creek looking upstream in East Chillisquaque Township

According to the United States Census Bureau, the township has a total area of 8.1 square miles (21 km^{2}), of which 0.56% is water.

== Demographics ==
Historical population
Census	Pop.	Note	%±
2010	668		—
2020	676		1.2%
U.S. Decennial Census

As of the census of 2000, there were 664 people, 262 households, and 195 families residing in the township. The population density was 82.2 inhabitants per square mile (31.7/km^{2}). There were 276 housing units at an average density of 34.1 per square mile (13.2/km^{2}). The racial makeup of the township was 99.10% White, 0.60% African American, 0.30% from other races. Hispanic or Latino of any race were 0.90% of the population.

There were 262 households, out of which 32.4% had children under the age of 18 living with them, 67.2% were married couples living together, 4.2% had a female householder with no husband present, and 25.2% were non-families. 21.8% of all households were made up of individuals, and 10.3% had someone living alone who was 65 years of age or older. The average household size was 2.53 and the average family size was 2.95.

In the township the population was spread out, with 25.2% under the age of 18, 5.7% from 18 to 24, 27.7% from 25 to 44, 25.5% from 45 to 64, and 16.0% who were 65 years of age or older. The median age was 40 years. For every 100 females, there were 103.7 males. For every 100 females age 18 and over, there were 95.7 males.

The median income for a household in the township was $40,882, and the median income for a family was $43,958. Males had a median income of $34,167 versus $22,000 for females. The per capita income for the township was $18,431. About 4.3% of families and 5.0% of the population were below the poverty line, including 4.3% of those under age 18 and 3.6% of those age 65 or over.
