= Potts Grove, Pennsylvania =

Unincorporated community in Pennsylvania, US

- Unincorporated community
- Location within Pennsylvania
- Coordinates: 40°59′37″N 76°47′21″W
- Country: United States
- State: Pennsylvania
- County: Northumberland
- Elevation: 495 ft (151 m)
- Time zone: UTC-5 (Eastern (EST))
  - Summer (DST): UTC-4 (EDT)
- ZIP code: 17865
- Area codes: 272 & 570
- GNIS feature ID: 1184348

Potts Grove is an unincorporated community in Northumberland County, Pennsylvania, United States. The community is located along Pennsylvania Route 642, 3.3 miles (5.3 km) east-southeast of Milton. Potts Grove has a post office, with ZIP code 17865, which opened on January 18, 1830.
