= Mooresburg, Pennsylvania =

Unincorporated community in Pennsylvania, US

- Unincorporated community
- Location within Pennsylvania Location within the United States
- Coordinates: 40°58′58″N 76°42′17″W
- Country: United States
- State: Pennsylvania
- County: Montour
- Elevation: 636 ft (194 m)
- Time zone: UTC-5 (Eastern (EST))
  - Summer (DST): UTC-4 (EDT)
- Area code: 570
- GNIS feature ID: 1181517

Mooresburg (see also Moores Burg) is an unincorporated community in Liberty Township, Montour County, Pennsylvania, United States. Its latitude is 40.982N. Its longitude is -76.705W.

== Notable person ==
- Christopher Sholes, the inventor of the first commercially successful typewriter, was born in Mooresburg.
