= Washingtonville, Pennsylvania =

Borough in Pennsylvania, US

- Borough
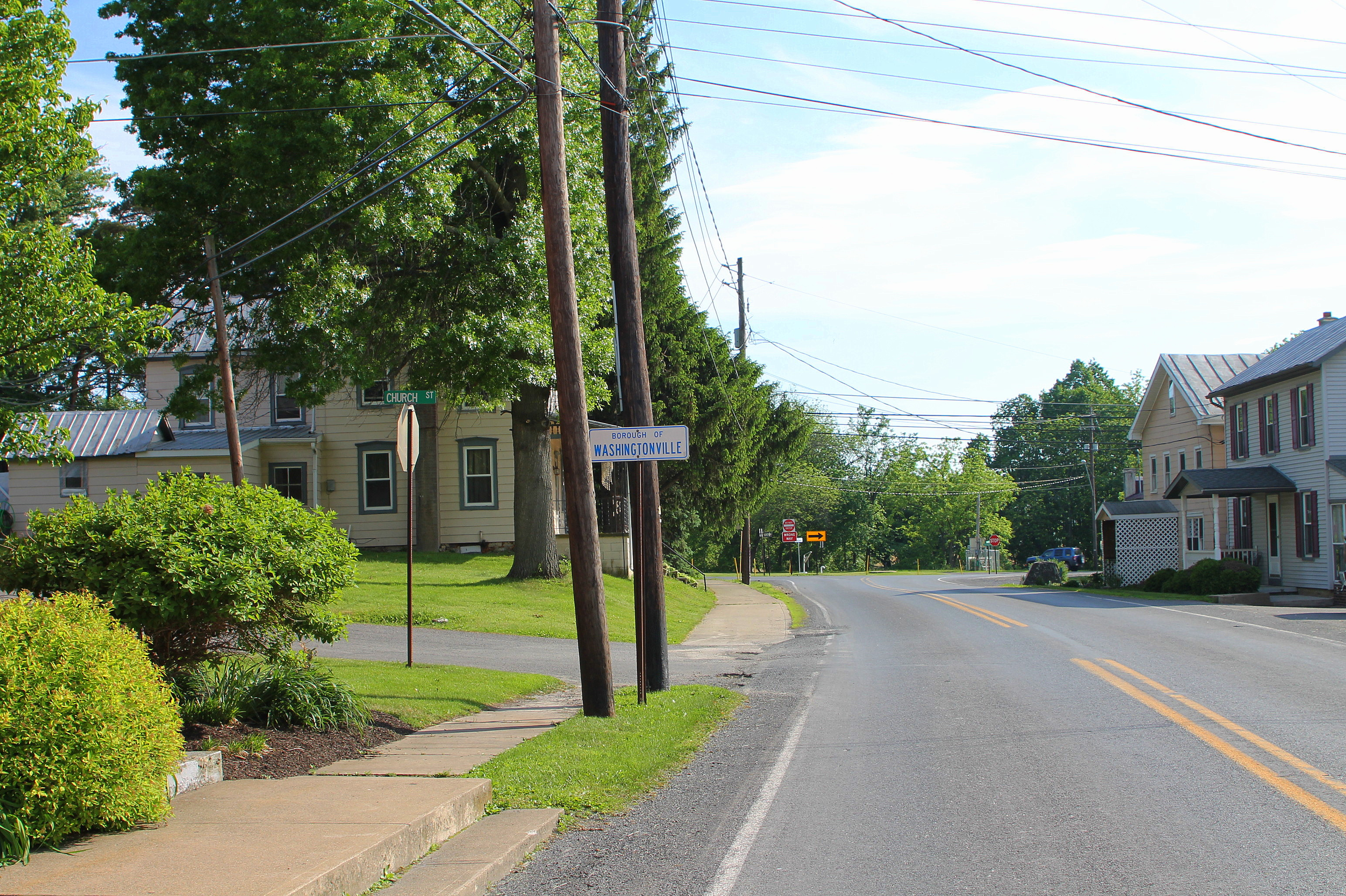
- Entering Washingtonville from Strawberry Ridge Road

- Location of Washingtonville in Montour County, Pennsylvania.

- Location within the U.S. state of Pennsylvania Washingtonville (the United States)
- Coordinates: 41°03′09″N 76°40′30″W
- Country: United States
- State: Pennsylvania
- County: Montour
- Settled: 1775
- Founded as Washington: September 27, 1796
- Name Change to Washingtonville: September 8, 1828
- Incorporated (borough): April 28, 1870

Government
  - Mayor: Tyler Dombroski

Area
  - Total: 0.054 sq mi (0.14 km^{2})
  - Land: 0.054 sq mi (0.14 km^{2})
  - Water: 0 sq mi (0.00 km^{2})
- Elevation (center of borough): 520 ft (160 m)
- Highest elevation (hill on western borough boundary): 570 ft (170 m)
- Lowest elevation (Chillisquaque Creek): 495 ft (151 m)

Population (2020)
  - Total: 200 ▼
  - Estimate (2021): 202
  - Density: 5,052.7/sq mi (1,950.85/km^{2})
- Time zone: Eastern (EST)
  - Summer (DST): EDT
- ZIP code: 17884
- Area code: 570
- FIPS code: 42-81424

Washingtonville is a borough in Montour County, Pennsylvania, United States. The population was 200 at the 2020 census. It is part of the Bloomsburg-Berwick micropolitan area.

== History ==
The small borough is named after the first American president, George Washington. Before the time of the town's founding during the Revolutionary War, Fort Bosley stood along the eastern backs of Chillisquaque Creek near its confluence with Mud Creek. During, the early 20th century, millionaire Frank DeLong would often visit the borough to get away from the city. He ended up donating a school, which at the time was considered one of the best facilities in the country, to the town. He also turned the old Presbyterian Church into a memorial for his mother. Today, the old school building is now a nursing home, and the memorial still stands today, containing many historical artifacts. Recently, the remains of an 18th-century log cabin were discovered at the corner of Front and Water Streets, suggesting early settlement of permanent residents.

== Geography ==
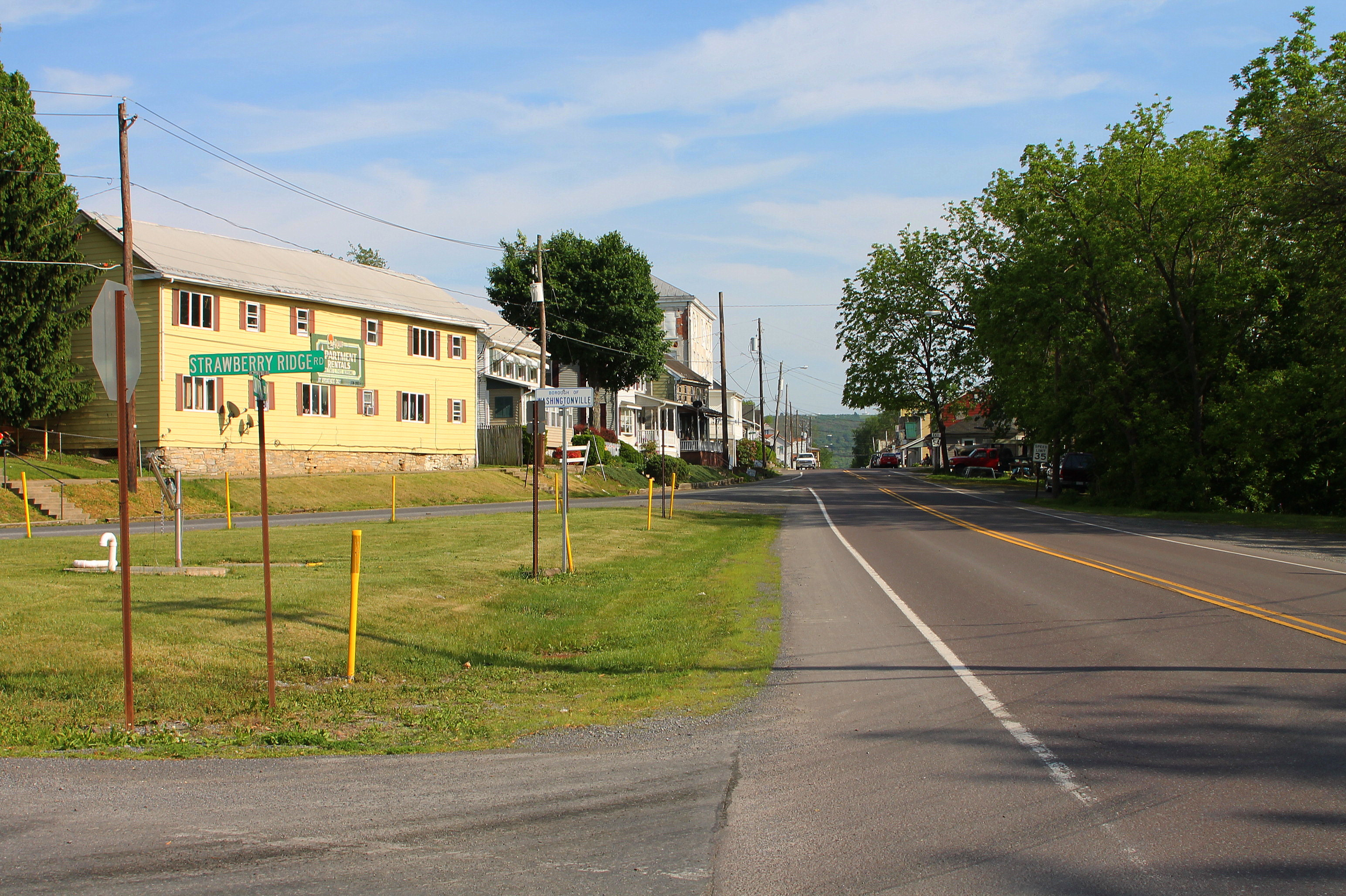
Entering Washingtonville from Pennsylvania Route 54

According to the United States Census Bureau, the borough has a total area of 0.1 square miles (0.26 km^{2}), all land. Washingtonville sits at the intersection of state routes 54 and 254. Washingtonville is bordered on the west by Chillisquaque Creek. The eastern part of the borough is atop a low hill. The town's land is almost entirely residential.

== Demographics ==
Historical population
Census	Pop.	Note	%±
1870	172		—
1880	203		18.0%
1890	171		−15.8%
1900	212		24.0%
1910	183		−13.7%
1920	177		−3.3%
1930	182		2.8%
1940	175		−3.8%
1950	194		10.9%
1960	198		2.1%
1970	174		−12.1%
1980	218		25.3%
1990	228		4.6%
2000	201		−11.8%
2010	273		35.8%
2020	202		−26.0%
2021 (est.)	202	Steady	0.0%

As of the census of 2000, there were 201 people, 82 households, and 51 families residing in the borough. The population density was 3,498.0 inhabitants per square mile (1,350.6/km^{2}). There were 93 housing units at an average density of 1,618.5 per square mile (624.9/km^{2}). The racial makeup of the borough was 97.01% White, 1.49% African American, 0.50% Asian, and 1.00% from two or more races.

There were 82 households, out of which 29.3% had children under the age of 18 living with them, 50.0% were married couples living together, 11.0% had a female householder with no husband present, and 37.8% were non-families. 32.9% of all households were made up of individuals, and 6.1% had someone living alone who was 65 years of age or older. The average household size was 2.45 and the average family size was 3.18.

In the borough the population was spread out, with 24.4% under the age of 18, 10.0% from 18 to 24, 32.3% from 25 to 44, 23.9% from 45 to 64, and 9.5% who were 65 years of age or older. The median age was 35 years. For every 100 females there were 105.1 males. For every 100 females age 18 and over, there were 100.0 males.

The median income for a household in the borough was $35,278, and the median income for a family was $38,393. Males had a median income of $37,292 versus $17,500 for females. The per capita income for the borough was $21,206. About 15.1% of families and 19.6% of the population were below the poverty line, including 28.1% of those under the age of eighteen and 12.5% of those sixty five or over.
