= Green Creek (Fishing Creek tributary) =

Coordinates: 41°04′57″N 76°25′27″W

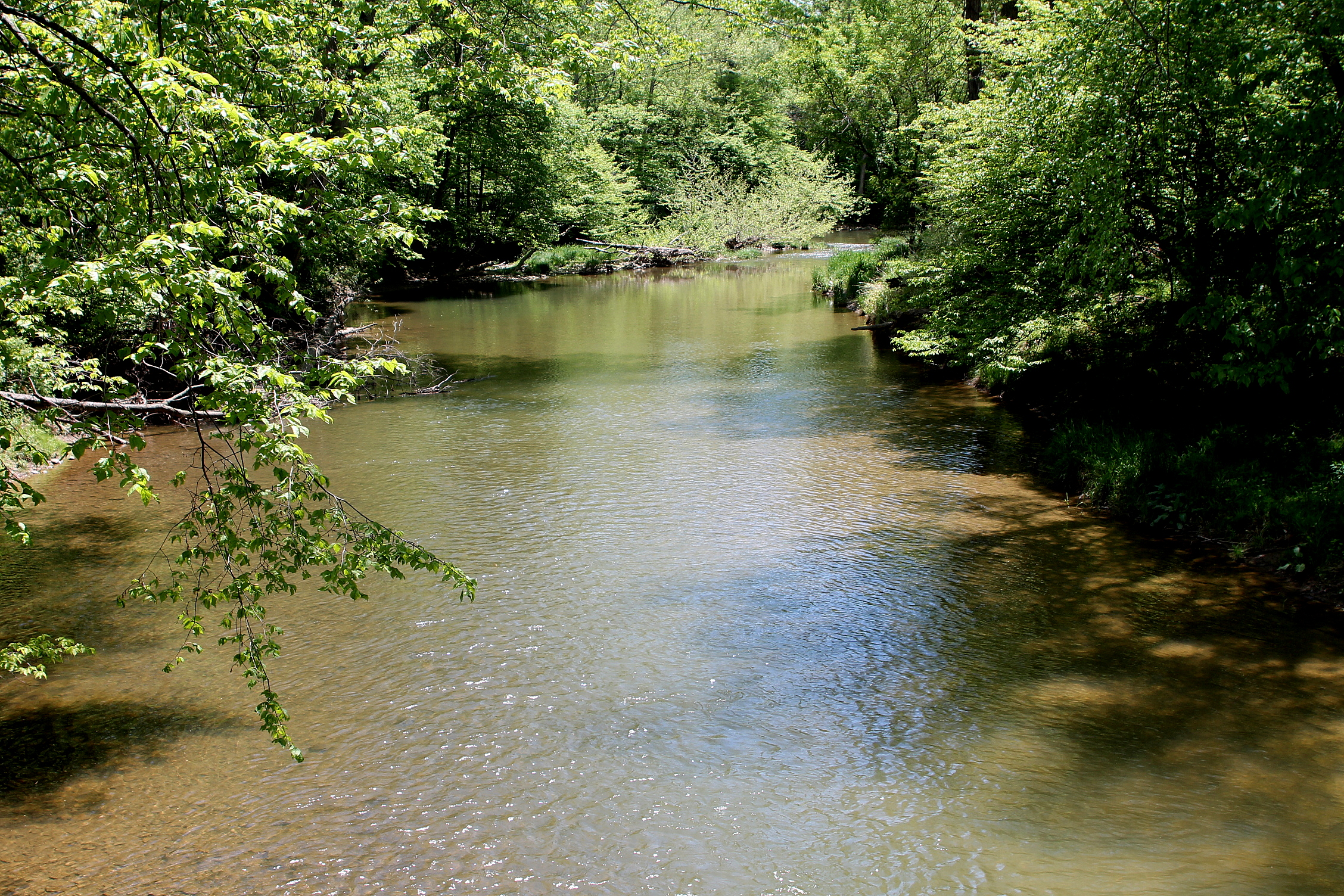
- the lower reaches of Green Creek in late spring
- Etymology: named for the apparent color of its waters

Physical characteristics
- Source
  - location: hill near Waller in Jackson Township, Columbia County, Pennsylvania
  - elevation: 1,246 ft (380 m)
- Mouth
  - location: Fishing Creek in Orange Township, Pennsylvania
  - elevation: 561 ft (171 m)
- Length: 12.7 mi (20.4 km)
- Basin size: 36.8 mi^{2} (95 km^{2})

Basin features
- Progression: Fishing Creek → Susquehanna River → Chesapeake Bay
- Tributaries
  - left: Rickard Hollow
  - right: Little Green Creek, Mud Run

Green Creek is a tributary of Fishing Creek in Columbia County, Pennsylvania, in the United States. It is approximately 12.7 miles (20.4 km) long and flows through Jackson Township, Greenwood Township, and Orange Township. The watershed of the creek has an area of 36.8 square miles (95 km^{2}). Green Creek has three named tributaries: Little Green Creek, Rickard Hollow, and Mud Run. The creek is not designated as an impaired waterbody and is a relatively large stream, contributing a significant amount of water to Fishing Creek. A valley known as the Greenwood Valley is located in the vicinity of Green Creek. The creek's own valley was likely affected by glaciation during the Ice Age.

Soil erosion is a significant concern in some areas of the watershed of Green Creek, especially in the Greenwood Valley. A number of bridges have been constructed over the creek, including a covered bridge known as the Patterson Covered Bridge. Settlers arrived in the vicinity of the creek by the late 18th century and early 19th century, and a few mills of various were built on it in the 19th century. An Indian path also used to follow the creek for some distance.

The drainage basin of Green Creek is designated as a Trout Stocked Fishery and a Migratory Fishery. The creek itself contains brown trout. The creek has relatively narrow riparian buffers in some reaches. However, it has a hemlock-rich floodplain in Jackson Township.

== Course ==
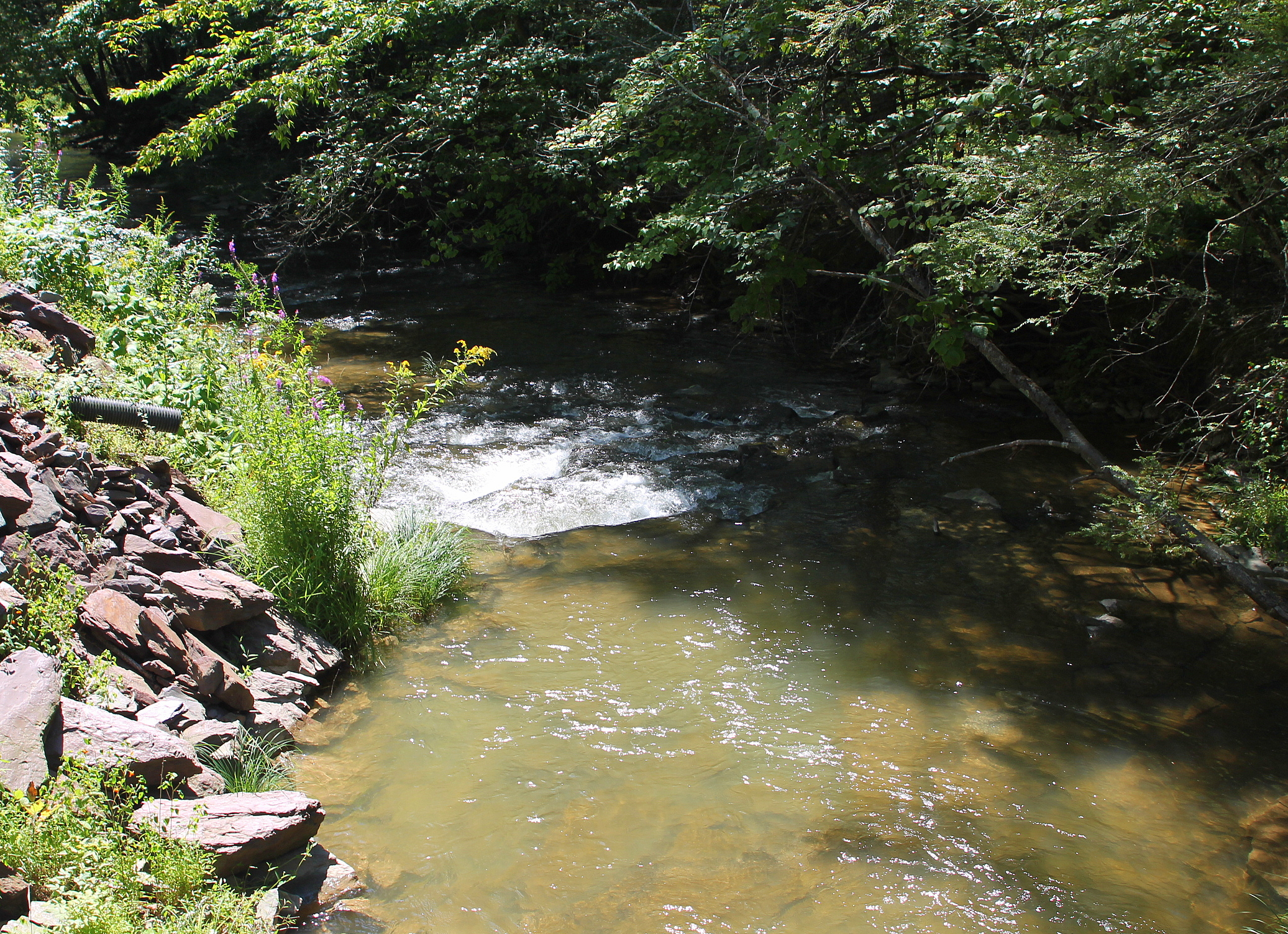
Green Creek looking downstream in Jackson Township

Green Creek begins on a hill in Jackson Township, near the census-designated place of Waller. It flows south for a few tenths of a mile and enters Waller before turning south-southwest for a few tenths of a mile and leaving Waller. The creek then passes through a pond and turns south-southeast, flowing through a valley near the western border of Waller. After several tenths of a mile, it passes through two more ponds and turns south-southwest for a few tenths of a mile before turning south and then south-southwest, passing through another small pond. The creek eventually turns south-southwest for several tenths of a mile before turning south-southeast and entering Greenwood Township.

In Greenwood Township, Green Creek passes by O'Brien Hill and turns south-southwest for several tenths of a mile before turning south-southeast, eventually flowing alongside Pennsylvania Route 254 and turning south as it passes Kramer Hill. After more than a mile, the creek's valley becomes much shallower and it enters the census-designated place of Rohrsburg. Here, it crosses Pennsylvania Route 254 and receives its first named tributary, Little Green Creek, from the right. It then turns south, east, and south-southeast for several tenths of a mile before receiving the tributary Rickard Hollow from the left. The creek then turns south-southwest for a few tenths of a mile, exiting Rohrsburg and receiving the tributary Mud Run from the right and entering Orange Township.

Upon entering Orange Township, Green Creek turns south-southeast, flowing alongside Rohrsburg Road, and its valley quickly becomes deeper and narrower again. After several tenths of a mile, the creek turns south and passes by Round Top before turning south-southeast and entering a shared floodplain with Fishing Creek. It then heads in a southerly direction for several tenths of a mile before turning west-southwest. Several tenths of a mile further downstream, the creek abruptly turns south-southeast and almost immediately reaches its confluence with Fishing Creek.

Green Creek joins Fishing Creek 10.84 miles (17.45 km) upstream of the latter creek's mouth.

=== Tributaries ===
Green Creek has three named tributaries: Mud Run, Rickard Hollow, and Little Green Creek. Mud Run joins Green Creek 3.06 miles (4.92 km) upstream of its mouth and drains an area of 13.3 square miles (34 km^{2}). Rickard Hollow joins Green Creek 3.56 miles (5.73 km) upstream of its mouth and drains an area of 2.22 square miles (5.7 km^{2}). Little Green Creek 4.16 miles (6.69 km) upstream of its mouth and drains an area of 5.01 square miles (13.0 km^{2}).

== Hydrology ==
Green Creek is not designated as an impaired waterbody. The waters of Green Creek considerably increase the flow of Fishing Creek at Orange Township. In 1841, the creek was described as a "considerable stream" with water power of "no little magnitude".

At a site in the upper reaches of Green Creek, where its watershed has an area of 2.55 square miles (6.6 km^{2}), the creek's average daily discharge was once measured to be 4.44 cubic feet per second (0.126 m^{3}/s). Further downstream, where the creek drains an area of 9.42 square miles (24.4 km^{2}), its average daily discharge was measured to be 16.40 cubic feet per second (0.464 m^{3}/s). In its lower reaches, where it drains an area of 33.24 square miles (86.1 km^{2}), the average daily discharge was 57.87 cubic feet per second (1.639 m^{3}/s).

== Geography and geology ==
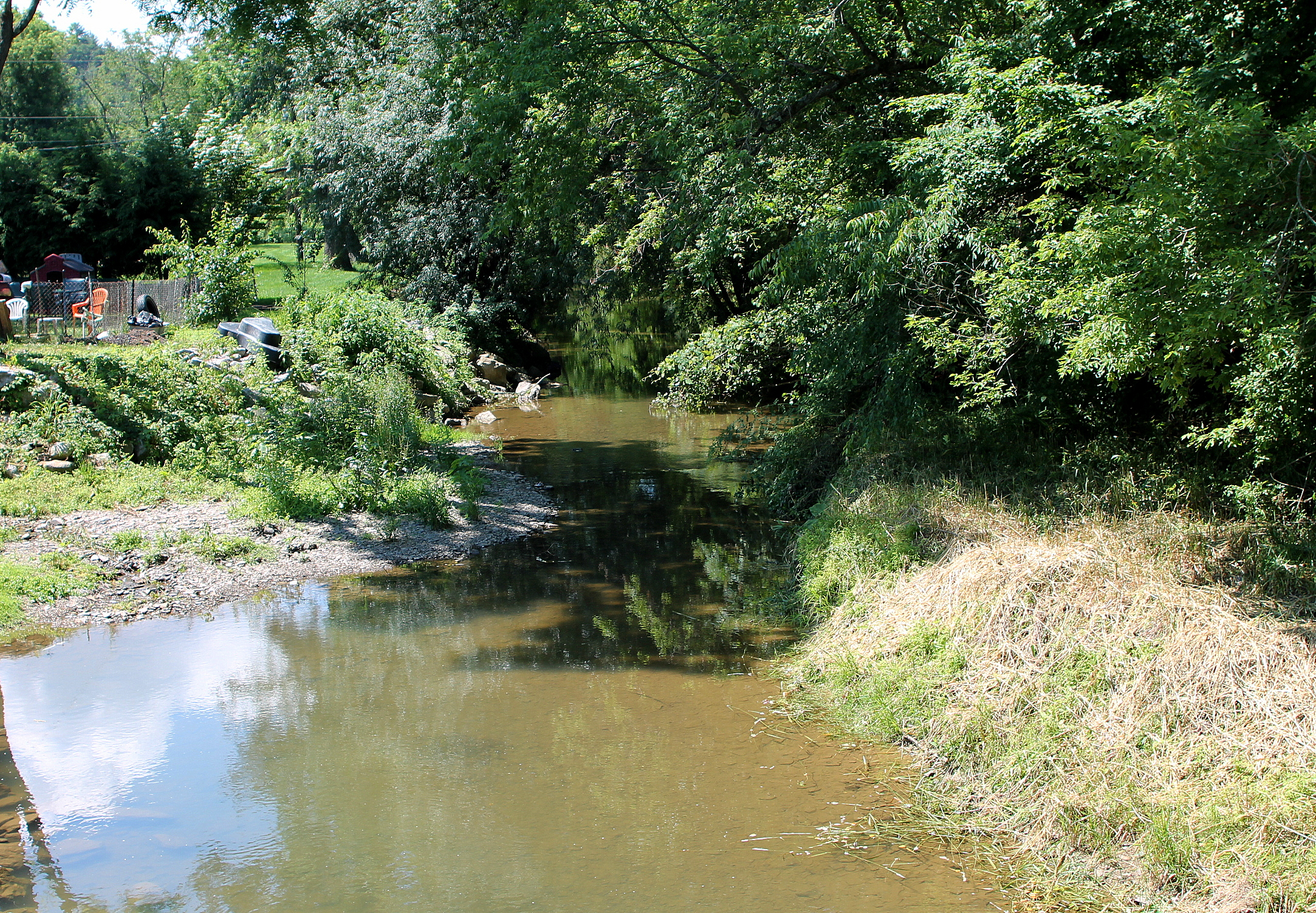
Green Creek looking downstream in Rohrsburg

The elevation near the mouth of Green Creek is 561 feet (171 m) above sea level. The elevation of the creek's source is between 1,246 feet (380 m) above sea level.

A valley known as the Greenwood Valley stretches between Green Creek and Little Fishing Creek in southern Greenwood Township. The creek is in the Ridge And Valley Freestone region. A system of hills and hollows is situated between Fishing Creek and Green Creek.

In the upper reaches of Green Creek, a 788-foot (240 m) section of the creek contained 49 percent riffles, 33 percent runs, and 18 percent pools. Further downstream, an 825-foot (251 m) section of the creek contained 32 percent riffles, 32 percent runs, and 36 percent pools. In the lower reaches, a 1,010-foot (310 m) reach of Green Creek contained 17 percent riffles, 17 percent runs, and 66 percent pools.

Historically, a large whirlpool known as the Spinning Wheel or the Witch's Kettle existed on Green Creek approximately 2 miles (3.2 km) south of Rohrsburg. It is believed to have been approximately 60 feet (18 m) wide and over 200 feet (61 m) deep. During the late 19th century, trash from Orangeville and Rohrsburg was poured into the whirlpool, causing it to begin to fill up by 1900. Flooding later altered the creek's course, so now there is a road over the site of the whirlpool.

During the Ice Age, ice movements may have occurred down the valley of Green Creek. Drift and cobbles are present along the creek's valley as high as 100 feet (30 m) above the valley floor.

Coal oil has been historically observed in the vicinity of Green Creek.

== Watershed ==
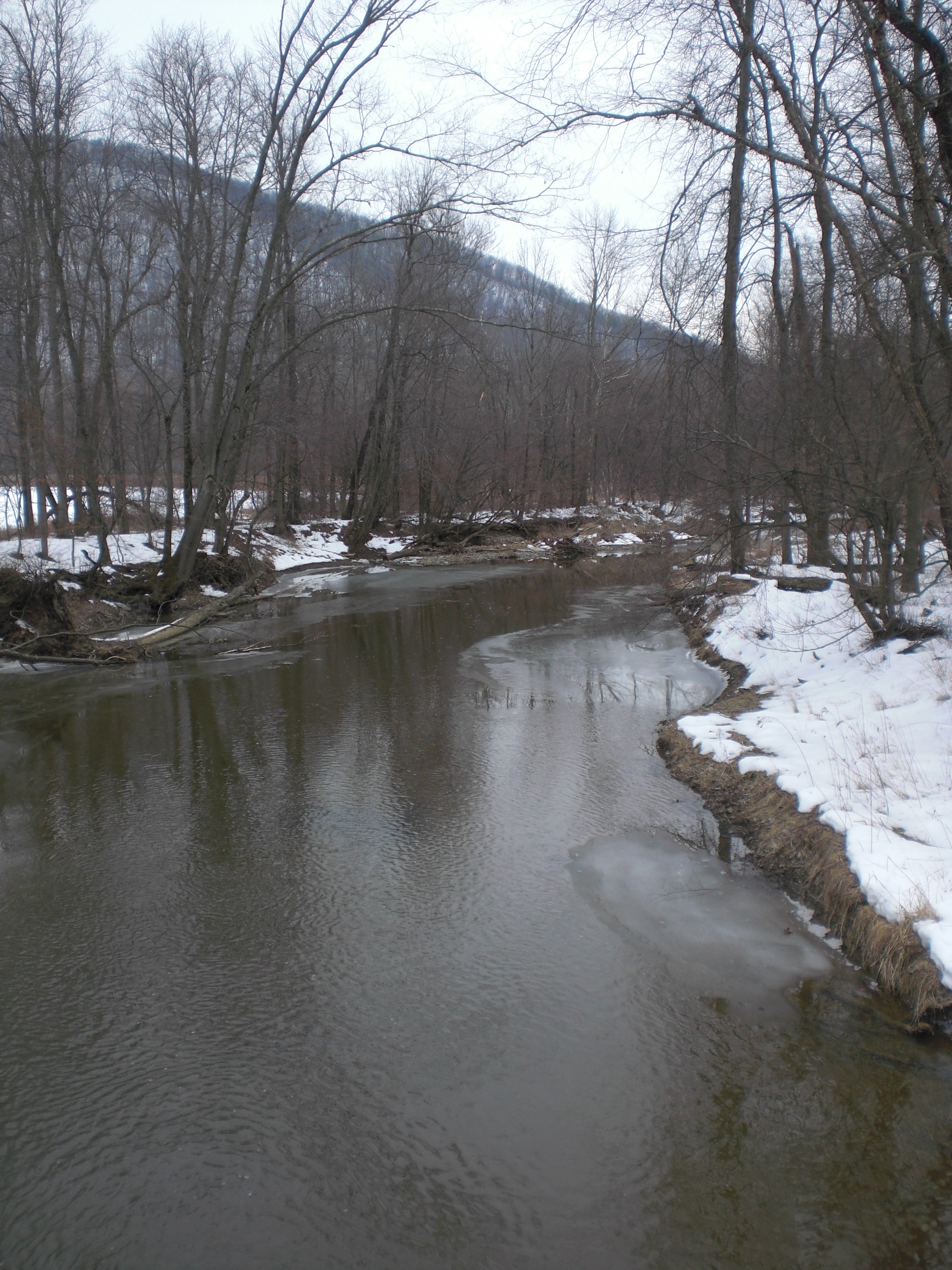
Green Creek in late winter

The watershed of Green Creek has an area of 36.8 square miles (95 km^{2}). The mouth of the creek is in the United States Geological Survey quadrangle of Bloomsburg. However, its source is in the quadrangle of Benton.

Soil erosion is a significant concern in some areas of the watershed of Green Creek. This especially includes the Greenwood Valley, which is used for agriculture relatively heavily. In 2015, there was a project to stabilize 300 feet (91 m) of streambanks on the creek in Jackson Township.

== History and etymology ==
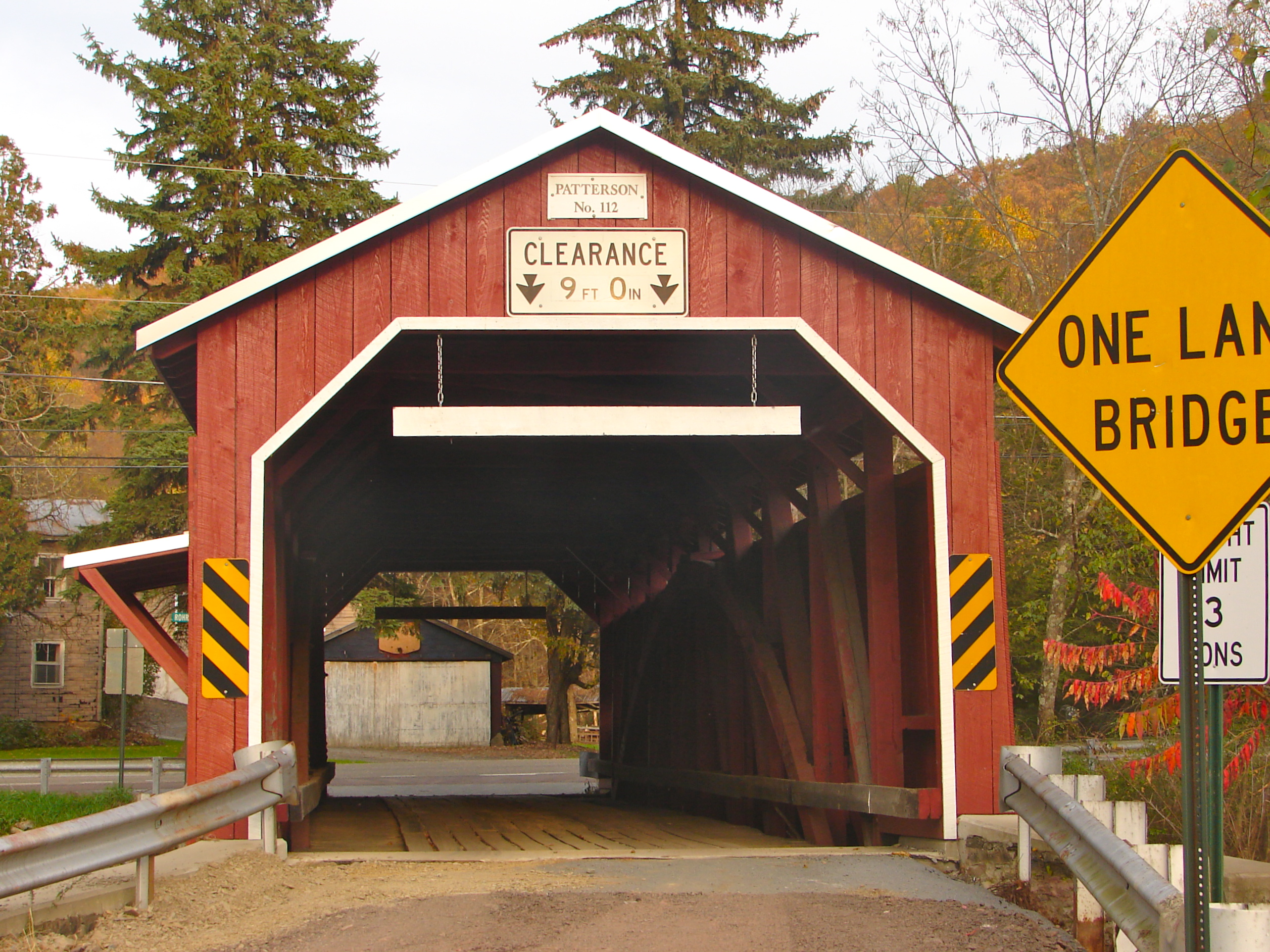
Patterson Covered Bridge over Green Creek

Green Creek was entered into the Geographic Names Information System on August 2, 1979. Its identifier in the Geographic Names Information System is 1176059. The creek is named for the way its waters appear greenish in color; this color is enhanced further during the summer months due to vegetation on its banks being reflected in the water.

An Indian path connecting the Wyoming Valley with Muncy once existed, following Green Creek from its mouth upstream to near Rohrsburg. In 1778, Moses Van Campen headed a scouting expedition from Fort McClure to Fort Wheeler, and then to the headwaters of Green Creek, before crossing to Little Fishing Creek via Eves Swamp and eventually reaching Muncy Creek.

In 1797, the four Mather brothers—Thomas, Samuel, John, and William—came from the Buffalo Valley to settle near Green Creek. Jacob Lunger came from Northampton County, Pennsylvania and settled on Green Creek in 1800. In 1805, Abram Whiteman settled at the headwaters of the creek. Abram Kline constructed a sawmill on the creek at one point, but it was abandoned after a few years, and entirely gone by the early 1900s. The first flouring mill in the Rohrsburg area was built on Green Creek by Joseph Fullmer. In 1832, a fulling and carding mill were operated on the creek immediately north of Rohrsburg by Joseph E. Sands, but it was moved to Mordansville in 1856. In the 19th century, a school/geographical district in northeastern Greenwood Township was known as the Green Creek District, after Green Creek, which flowed through it. A covered bridge known as the Patterson Covered Bridge was built over the creek in 1875 by Frank Derr for $804 and was named for a nearby sawmill.

A concrete tee beam bridge carrying T-682 over Green Creek was built 2 miles (3.2 km) west of Benton in 1923 and is 36.1 feet (11.0 m) long. Another bridge of the same type, but carrying Green Creek Road over the creek, was built in 1934 1 mile (1.6 km) south of Waller and is 23.0 feet (7.0 m) long. A third concrete tee beam bridge, this one carrying T-455, was constructed across Green Creek in 1936 0.6 miles (0.97 km) north-northwest of Rohrsburg and is 39.0 feet (11.9 m) long. In 1961, a two-span prestressed box beam or girders bridge carrying State Route 4020 was built across the creek 1 mile (1.6 km) north of Orangeville and is 86.0 feet (26.2 m) long. A two-span steel culvert bridge carrying T-761 over the creek 3 miles (4.8 km) west of Benton was built in 1986 and is 29.9 feet (9.1 m) long. In 1992, a prestressed box beam or girders bridge carrying Pennsylvania Route 254 was constructed over the creek in Rohrsburg and is 83.0 feet (25.3 m) long. A bridge of a similar type, but carrying State Route 4045, was built over the creek in 2011 3 miles (4.8 km) north of Rohrsburg and is 42.0 feet (12.8 m) long.

== Biology ==
The drainage basin of Green Creek is designated as a Trout Stocked Fishery and a Migratory Fishery. Wild trout naturally reproduce in the creek from near its headwaters downstream to its mouth, a distance of 12.30 miles (19.79 km). As of the late 1990s, brown trout have been observed in the creek.

A site known as the Green Creek Floodplain is listed as a "locally significant site" on the Columbia County Natural Areas Inventory. The site consists of a section of the floodplain of Green Creek forested with hemlock in Jackson Township. Other environmentally sensitive natural features may also exist along the creek in Greenwood Township.

Green Creek has a relatively narrow riparian buffer in some reaches, and could benefit from these buffers being broadened. As of 2004, purple loosestrife colonies are growing and expanding along the creek.

== See also ==
- Deerlick Run, next tributary of Fishing Creek going downstream
- Huntington Creek (Pennsylvania), next tributary of Fishing Creek going upstream
- List of tributaries of Fishing Creek (North Branch Susquehanna River)
- List of rivers of Pennsylvania
