= Little Green Creek =

River in Columbia County, Pennsylvania, US

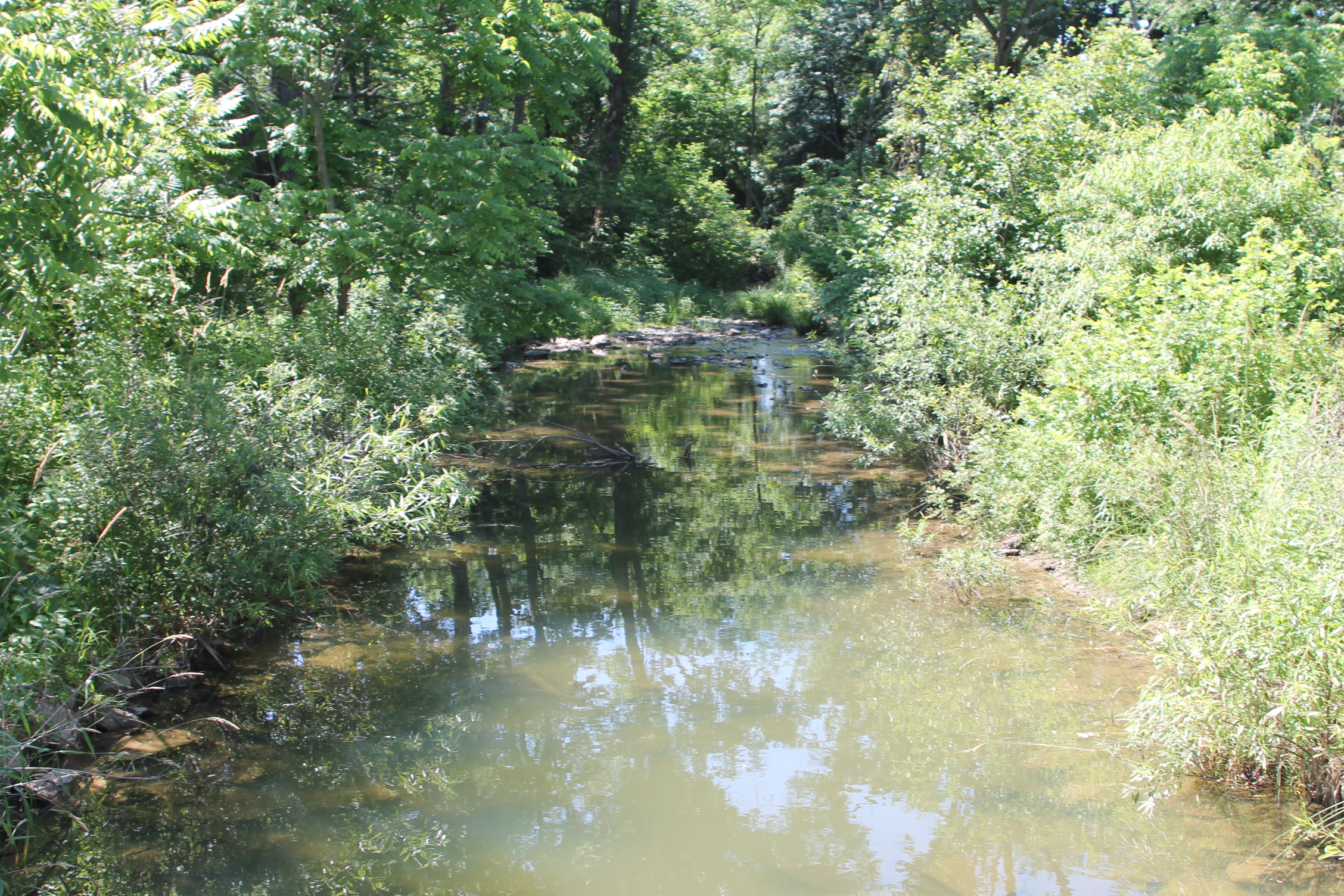
- Little Green Creek looking downstream from Pennsylvania Route 254
- Etymology: the fact that it is smaller than Green Creek

Physical characteristics
- Source
  - location: valley in Greenwood Township, Columbia County, Pennsylvania
  - elevation: between 1,020 and 1,040 feet (310 and 320 m)
- Mouth
  - location: Green Creek in Greenwood Township, Columbia County, Pennsylvania
  - coordinates: 41°07′54″N 76°25′40″W
  - elevation: 617 ft (188 m)
- Length: 4.7 mi (7.6 km)
- Basin size: 5.01 mi^{2} (13.0 km^{2})

Basin features
- Progression: Green Creek → Fishing Creek

Little Green Creek is a tributary of Green Creek in Columbia County, Pennsylvania, in the United States. It is approximately 4.7 miles (7.6 km) long and flows through Greenwood Township. The watershed of the creek has an area of 5.01 square miles (13.0 km^{2}). At least two bridges have been built over the creek and at least one ridge and one hillside is in its vicinity.

== Course ==
Little Green Creek begins in a valley in Greenwood Township, less than a mile south of the border between Greenwood Township and Jackson Township. It flows east for some distance, receiving an unnamed tributary, before gradually turning southeast and flowing alongside the Austin Trail. Over the next few miles, it gradually turns south-southeast and south before its valley becomes abruptly shallower. The creek continues flowing south-southeast, crossing Pennsylvania Route 254 and entering Rohrsburg. In Rohrsburg, it reaches its confluence with Green Creek within several hundred feet.

Little Green Creek joins Green Creek 4.16 miles (6.69 km) upstream of its mouth.

== Geography and watershed ==
The elevation near the mouth of Little Green Creek is 617 feet (188 m) above sea level. The elevation of the creek's source is between 1,020 feet (310 m) and 1,040 feet (320 m) above sea level. A portion of the creek is near a densely forested and steep hillside that is 400 feet (120 m) high and is located on the northern edge of the Greenwood Valley. The August 19, 1890 Wilkes-Barre tornado began in the vicinity of this area. There is also a ridge located to the west of the creek.

The creek is one of several in Columbia County to have a 100-year floodplain.

The watershed of Little Green Creek has an area of 5.01 square miles (13.0 km^{2}). Both the source and the mouth of the creek are in the United States Geological Survey quadrangle of Benton. The Columbia County Natural Areas Inventory states that it is likely that "sensitive [biological] features" could be found along the creek.

== History and etymology ==
In the 19th century, a school district and geographic district known as the Little Green Creek District was present in northern Greenwood Township. It was named for Little Green Creek, which flowed through the district. The musician and composer Otto Porter Ikeler grew up on a farm on the Austin Trail in the vicinity of the creek.

Little Green Creek was entered into the Geographic Names Information System on August 2, 1979. Its identifier in the Geographic Names Information System is 1179558.

A steel stringer bridge was built over Little Green Creek in 1910 and repaired in 1991. It is 24.0 feet (7.3 m) long and is 1.2 miles (1.9 km) northwest of Rohrsburg. Another bridge, a concrete stringer bridge, was built over the creek in 1918. It is 25.9 feet (7.9 m) long and is 1.0 mile (1.6 km) northwest of Rohrsburg. The bridges carry T-599 and T-580, respectively.

Little Green Creek is named for the fact that it is smaller than Green Creek, which it is a tributary of.

== See also ==
- Rickard Hollow, next tributary of Green Creek going downstream
- List of tributaries of Fishing Creek (North Branch Susquehanna River)
