= Millville High School =

Millville High School may refer to:

- Millville High School (New Jersey) in New Jersey
- Millville Area Junior Senior High School in Pennsylvania
