= Rickard Hollow =

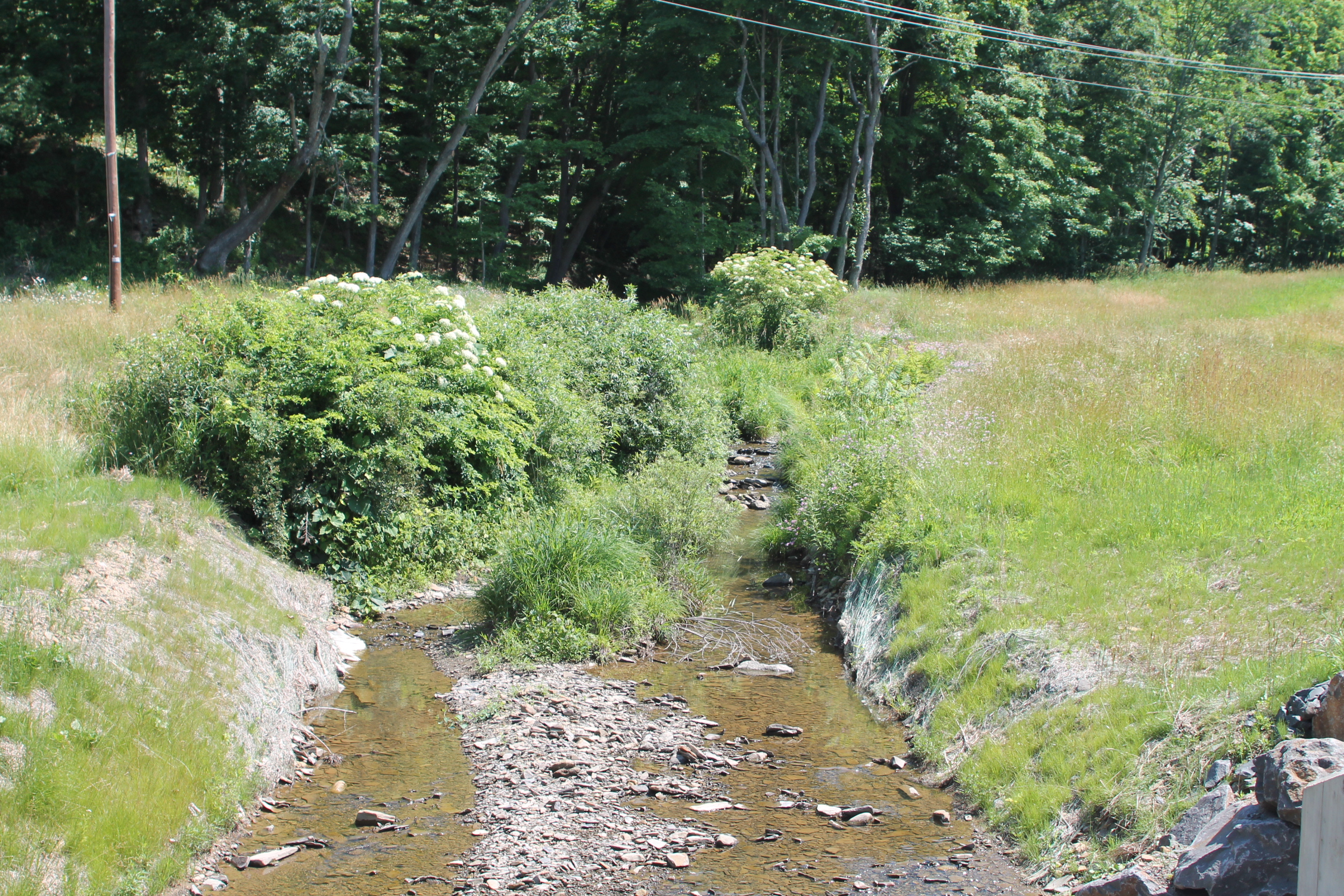
- Rickard Hollow in its lower reaches looking upstream
- Etymology: unknown; likely a local landowner or farmer

Physical characteristics
- Source
  - location: deep valley in Fishing Creek Township, Columbia County, Pennsylvania
  - elevation: between 1,000 and 1,020 feet (300 and 310 m)
- Mouth
  - location: Green Creek in Greenwood Township, Columbia County, Pennsylvania
  - coordinates: 41°07′30″N 76°25′29″W
  - elevation: 636 ft (194 m)
- Length: 2.6 mi (4.2 km)
- Basin size: 2.22 mi^{2} (5.7 km^{2})

Basin features
- Progression: Green Creek → Fishing Creek → Susquehanna River → Chesapeake Bay
- Tributaries
  - left: one unnamed tributary
  - right: one unnamed tributary

Rickard Hollow is a tributary of Green Creek in Columbia County, Pennsylvania, in the United States. It is approximately 2.6 miles (4.2 km) long and flows through Fishing Creek Township. The watershed of the stream has an area of 2.22 square miles (5.7 km^{2}). The stream itself has two unnamed tributaries and sewage is discharged into it. The exact origin of its name is not known.

== Course ==
Rickard Hollow begins in a deep valley in Fishing Creek Township, a few hundred feet west of the western edge of Stillwater. It flows southwest for a short distance before turning south-southwest for several tenths of a mile. The stream then turns west for a short distance, receiving an unnamed tributary of passing through a pond. It then turns south-southwest, flowing alongside T-633, which it crosses once. The stream eventually receives another unnamed tributary and enters Greenwood Township and Rohrsburg and continues flowing south-southwest. Eventually, it crosses Rohrsburg Road and turns roughly south. A few tenths of a mile further downstream, it reaches its confluence with Green Creek.

Rickard Hollow joins Green Creek 3.56 miles (5.73 km) upstream of its mouth.

=== Tributaries ===
Rickard Hollow has no named tributaries. However, it does have two unnamed tributaries.

== Geography and watershed ==
The elevation near the mouth of Rickard Hollow is 636 feet (194 m) above sea level. The elevation of the stream's source is between 1,000 feet (300 m) and 1,020 feet (310 m) above sea level. The stream is close to the Greenwood Valley and to another valley known as Davis Hollow.

The Greenwood Township Municipal Authority has a permit to discharge sewage into Rickard Hollow. It is waived by the United States Department of Environmental Protection. This is considered to be a minor discharge, with a discharge of only 7500 gallons per day.

The watershed of Rickard Hollow has an area of 2.22 square miles (5.7 km^{2}). Both the mouth and the source of the stream are in the United States Geological Survey quadrangle of Benton.

== History and etymology ==
Rickard Hollow was entered into the Geographic Names Information System on August 2, 1979. Its identifier in the Geographic Names Information System is 1185024.

The origin of Rickard Hollow's name is unknown. However, it is likely to be named after a local farmer or landowner.

== See also ==
- Mud Run, next tributary of Green Creek going downstream
- Little Green Creek, next tributary of Green Creek going upstream
- List of tributaries of Fishing Creek (North Branch Susquehanna River)
