= Mud Run (Green Creek tributary) =

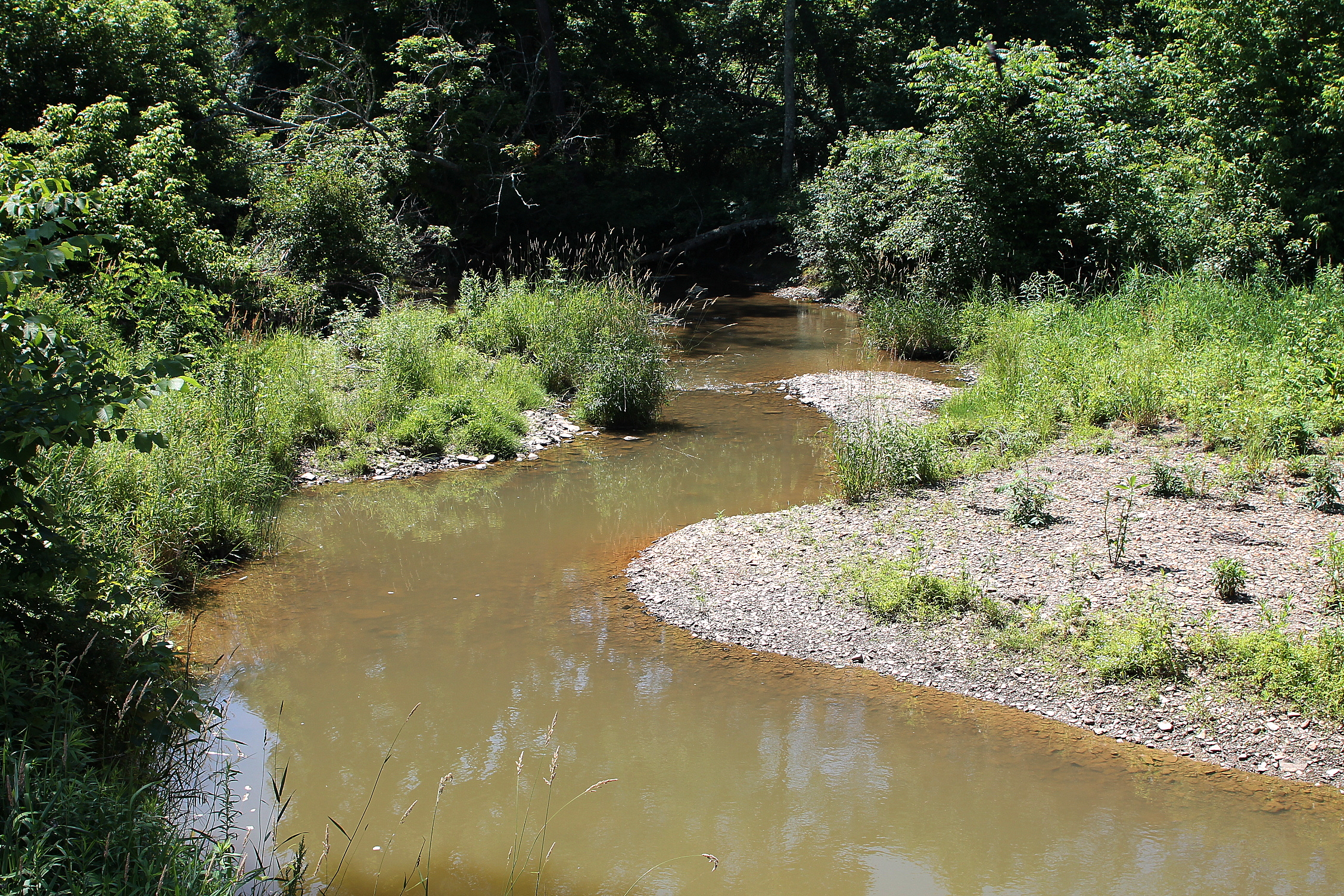
- Mud Run from Utt Road
- Etymology: named for its muddiness

Physical characteristics
- Source
  - location: Greenwood Township, Columbia County, Pennsylvania
- Mouth
  - location: Green Creek in Greenwood Township, Columbia County, Pennsylvania
  - coordinates: 41°07′05″N 76°25′33″W
  - elevation: 600 ft (180 m)
- Length: 5.7 mi (9.2 km)
- Basin size: 13.3 mi^{2} (34 km^{2})

Basin features
- Progression: Green Creek → Fishing Creek → Susquehanna River → Chesapeake Bay
- Tributaries
  - left: several unnamed tributaries

Mud Run is a tributary of Green Creek in Columbia County, Pennsylvania, in the United States. It is 5.7 miles (9.2 km) long and flows through Greenwood Township. The stream's watershed has an area of 13.3 square miles and is located in Greenwood Township, Orange Township, and Mount Pleasant Township. The stream is in the ridge and valley physiographic province. Its annual load of sediment is 4,394,600 pounds (1,993,400 kg). The Kramer Covered Bridge crosses the stream.

== Course ==
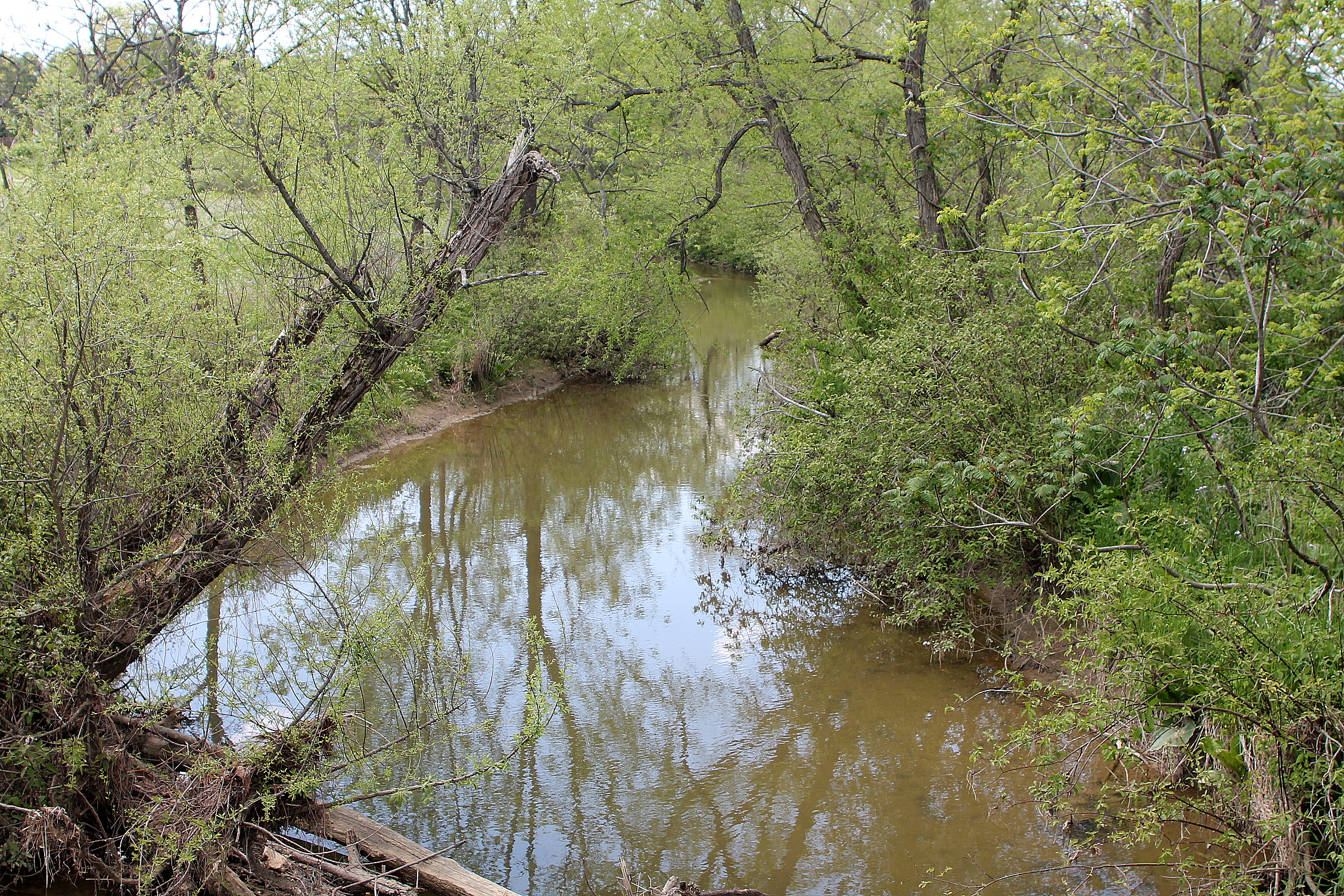
Mud Run looking upstream near the Kramer Covered Bridge No. 113

Mud Run begins in Greenwood Township on the western side of Bunker Hill. It flows south at first and after a short distance crosses Pennsylvania Route 254. The stream then turns southeast and flows into the Greenwood Valley. It then turns east and flows parallel to the southern edge of the valley for a number of miles, receiving several unnamed tributaries on the way. Near its mouth, the stream bends southeast and flows into Green Creek at the border between Greenwood Township and Orange Township.

== Hydrology ==
The daily load of sediment in Mud Run is 12,040 pounds (5,460 kg) per day, which equates to a load of 4,394,600 pounds (1,993,400 kg) per year. The total maximum daily load for sediment in the stream is 3,524,315 pounds (1,598,602 kg). The sediment loads are not significantly affected by the area's geology.

Croplands are the largest source of sediment in the Mud Run watershed, contributing 3,299,200 pounds (1,496,500 kg) per year. 453,800 pounds (205,800 kg) of sediment comes from stream banks annually, 255,000 pounds (116,000 kg) comes from hay and pastures, 218,600 pounds (99,200 kg) comes from land classified as "transition" by the Pennsylvania Department of Environmental Protection. 137,800 pounds (62,500 kg) of sediment comes from forests and land considered by the Pennsylvania Department of Environmental Protection to be "low-intensity development" contribute 37,200 pounds (16,900 kg) of sediment to the stream per year.

The entirety of Mud Run and all its tributaries are considered by the Pennsylvania Department of Environmental Protection to be impaired, with the exception of the streams in the watershed of Mud Run's final tributary.

== Geography and geology ==
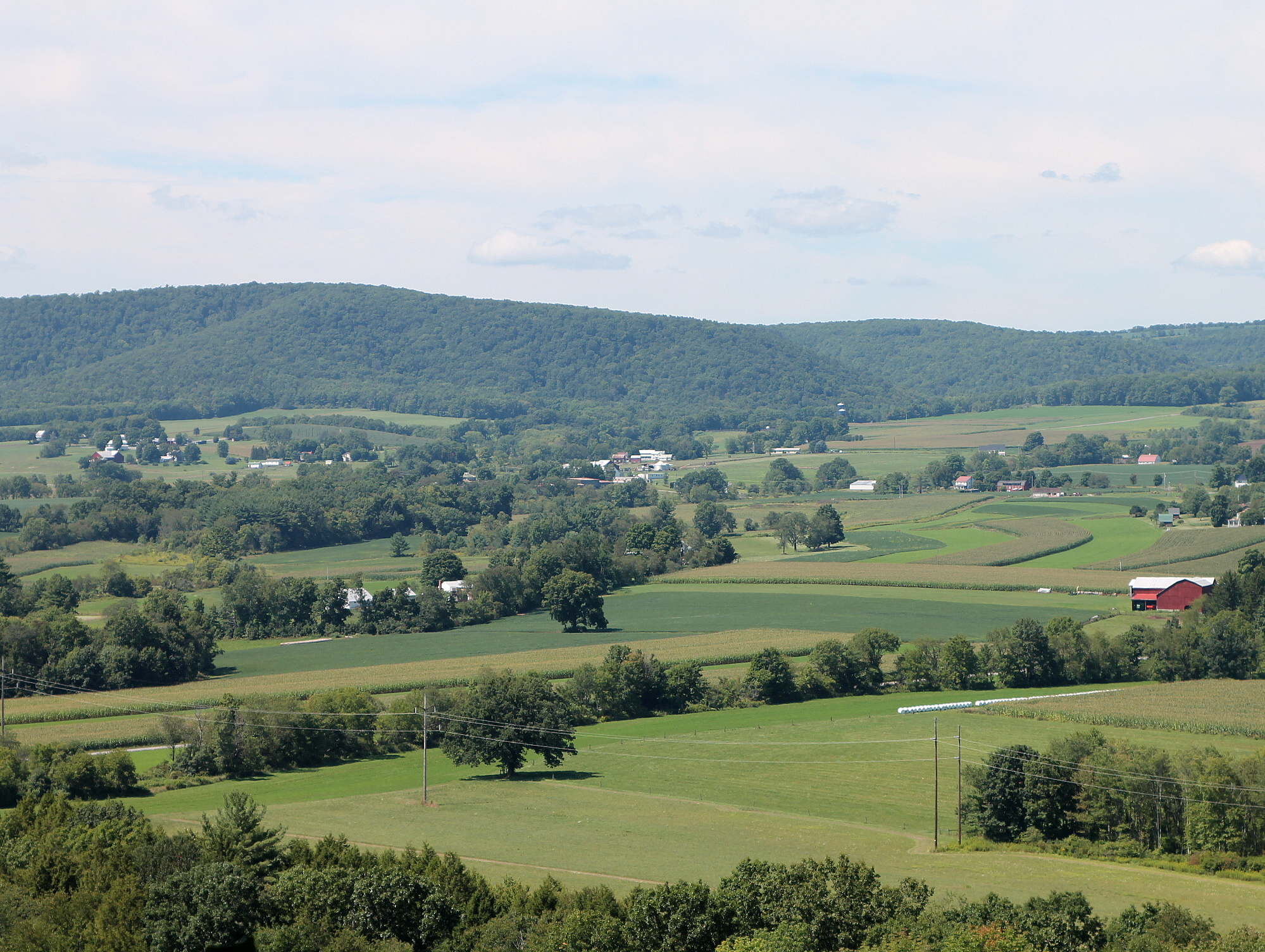
The Greenwood Valley, thorough which Mud Run flows

Mud Run is located in the ridge and valley physiographic province.

Elevations on Mud Run and its tributaries range from under 600 feet (180 m) above sea level to more than 1,340 feet (410 m) above sea level. The elevation of the stream near its mouth is exactly 600 feet (180 m). There are steep slopes in the watershed.

The K-factor, a measure of inherent soil erodability of the Mud Run watershed is 0.3 for wetlands, 0.29 for cropland, 0.284 for hay and pastures, and 0.26 for forests. The watershed's LS factor, which concerns slope steepness and length, is 4.705 in forests, 1.348 in hay and pastures.

== Watershed ==
The watershed of Mud Run has an area of 13.3 square miles. Much of the watershed, including the entirety of the stream and its tributaries, is in Greenwood Township. However, parts of the watershed are located in Orange Township and Mount Pleasant Township. The largest use of land in the watershed is agriculture, which makes up 49.3% of the watershed's area. 1,756.9 acres are hay and pasture and 2,394.4 are cropland. Forested land makes up nearly as much of the watershed, 45.4%. The remainder of the land is designated as "low-intensity development" by the Pennsylvania Department of Environmental Protection (5.2%), or is a wetland (0.1%).

There are 19.9 miles (32.0 km) of streams in the watershed of Mud Run. 14.2 miles (22.9 km) of streams are considered by the Pennsylvania Department of Environmental Protection to be impaired.

== Biology ==
Mud Run is designated as a trout-stocked fishery and a migratory fishery.

Conservation farming is not extensively practiced in the watershed of Mud Run. There are few or no riparian buffers on the stream. The P factor of the watershed, which concerns conservation farming practices, is on a scale of 0 to 1, 0.45 in the watershed's agricultural lands, 0.52 in forests, and 0.1 in wetlands.

== History and etymology ==
Mud Run is named for the fact that it is often muddy, especially after significant rainfall.

The Kramer Covered Bridge No. 113 crosses Mud Run. It was built in 1881 and named after Alexander Kramer, a farmer in the area. The bridge is 50 feet (15 m) long and was repaired in 2008.

== See also ==
- Rickard Hollow, next tributary of Green Creek going upstream
- List of tributaries of Fishing Creek (North Branch Susquehanna River)
