= Jerseytown, Pennsylvania =

Unincorporated community in Pennsylvania, US

- Census-designated place
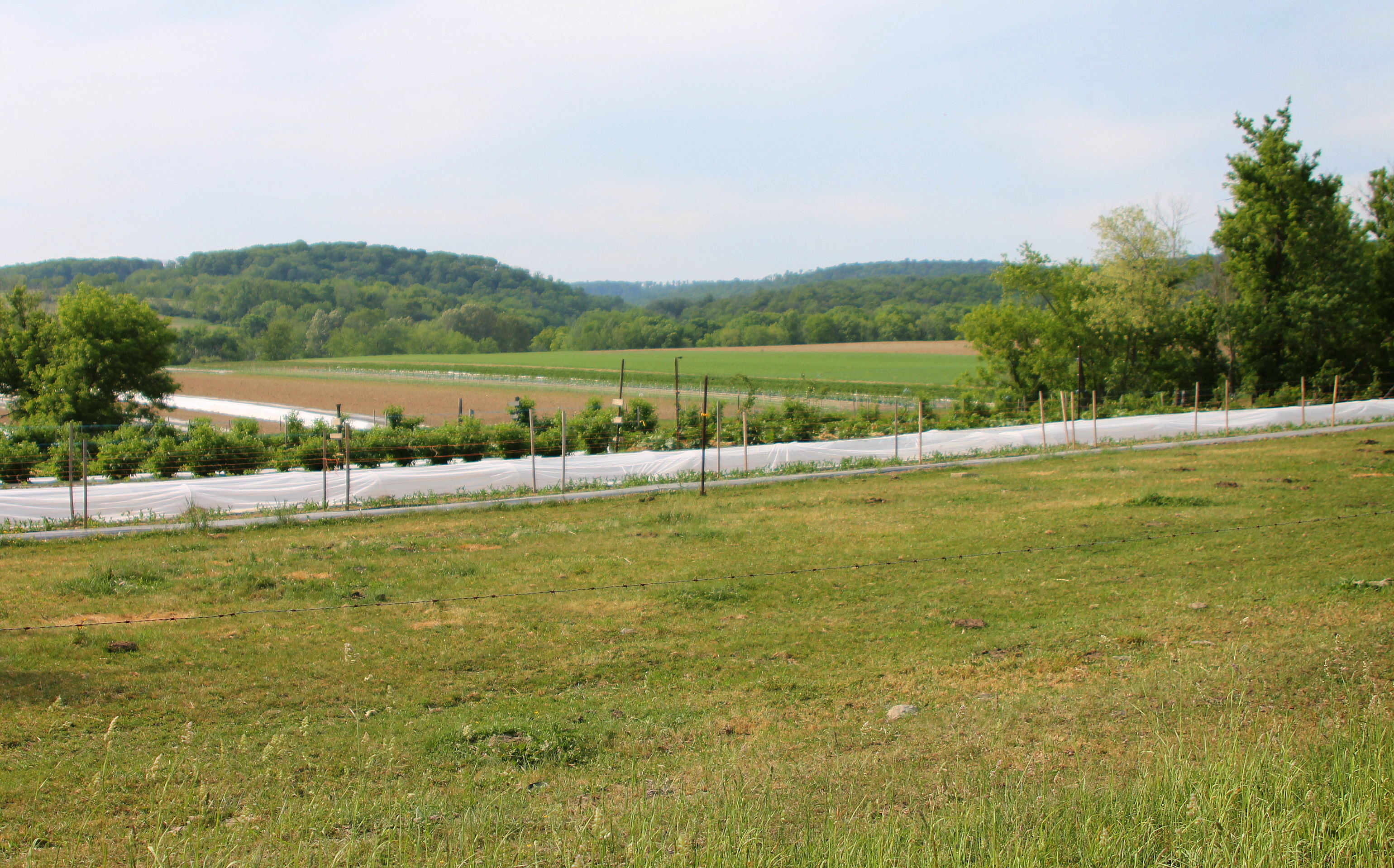
- View of Jerseytown

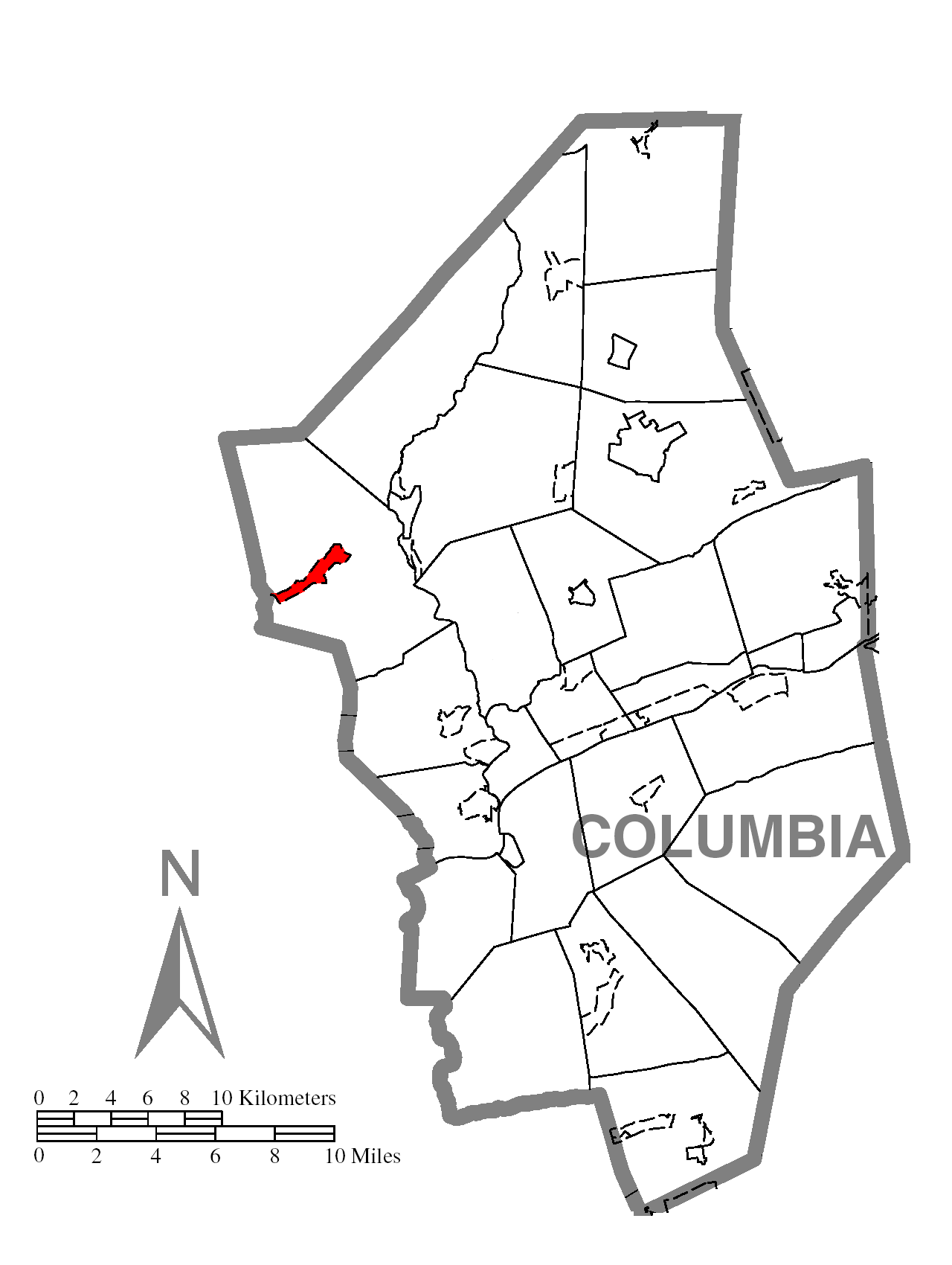
- Location within Columbia County

- Location within the U.S. state of Pennsylvania Jerseytown (the United States)
- Coordinates: 41°5′15″N 76°34′53″W
- Country: United States
- State: Pennsylvania
- County: Columbia
- Township: Madison

Area
  - Total: 0.73 sq mi (1.88 km^{2})
  - Land: 0.73 sq mi (1.88 km^{2})
  - Water: 0.0039 sq mi (0.01 km^{2})
- Elevation: 625 ft (191 m)

Population (2020)
  - Total: 175
  - Density: 241.7/sq mi (93.31/km^{2})
- Time zone: UTC-5 (Eastern (EST))
  - Summer (DST): UTC-4 (EDT)
- ZIP Code: 17815
- FIPS code: 42-38152
- GNIS feature ID: 1178061

Jerseytown is a census-designated place (CDP) that is located in Madison Township, Columbia County, Pennsylvania, United States. It is part of Northeastern Pennsylvania and of the Bloomsburg-Berwick micropolitan area.

The population was 175 at the time of the 2020 census.

== History ==
The land of the Jerseytown area was first bought by the Welliver family in 1785, after the Revolutionary War. A tannery was built in Jerseytown in 1826. The area continues to be rural and lightly populated.

== Geography ==
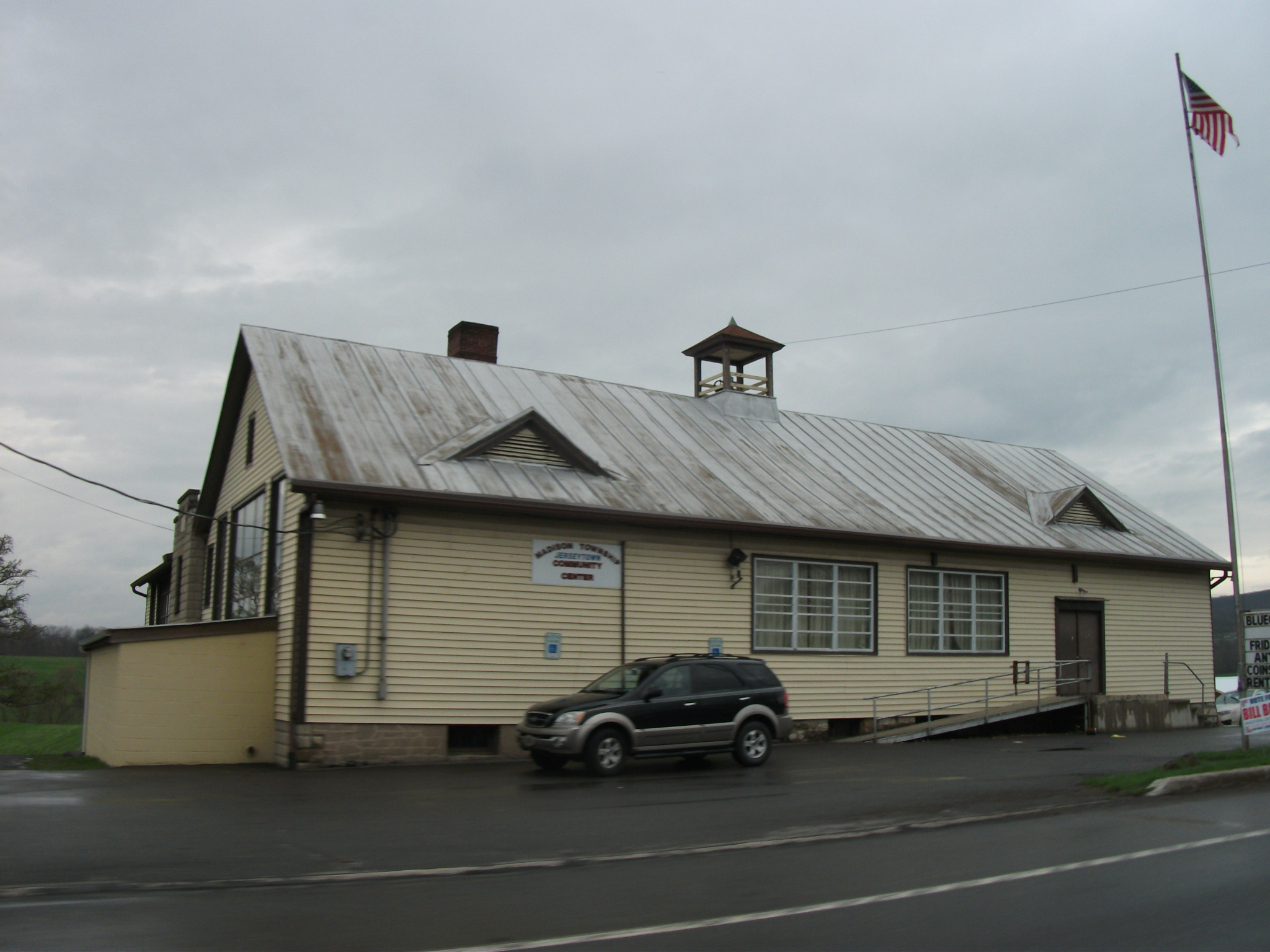
Madison Township/Jerseytown Community Center

Jerseytown is located in western Columbia County at 41°5′15″N 76°34′53″W (41.087459, -76.581405), near the center of Madison Township. According to the United States Census Bureau, the CDP has a total area of 0.73 square miles (1.9 km^{2}), all land.

Jerseytown is served by state routes 44 and 254. PA 44 leads northeast 3.5 miles (5.6 km) to Millville and southwest 16 miles (26 km) to Milton. PA 254 leads southeast 10 miles (16 km) to Bloomsburg, the Columbia County seat, and northwest/west 11 miles (18 km) to Turbotville. Jerseytown is mostly farmland with some forest.

== Demographics ==
Historical population
Census	Pop.	Note	%±
2020	175		—
U.S. Decennial Census

As of the census of 2000, there were 150 people, 50 households, and 42 families residing in the CDP. The population density was 127.9 inhabitants per square mile (49.4/km^{2}). There were 55 housing units at an average density of 46.9 per square mile (18.1/km^{2}).

The racial makeup of the CDP was 99.33% White and 0.67% Native American. Hispanic or Latino of any race were 0.67% of the population.

There were 50 households, out of which 28.0% had children under the age of 18 living with them, 82.0% were married couples living together, 2.0% had a female householder with no husband present, and 16.0% were non-families. 10.0% of all households were made up of individuals, and 4.0% had someone living alone who was 65 years of age or older. The average household size was 2.88 and the average family size was 2.83.

In the CDP, the population was spread out, with 16.7% under the age of 18, 4.7% from 18 to 24, 24.0% from 25 to 44, 35.3% from 45 to 64, and 19.3% who were 65 years of age or older. The median age was 46 years. For every 100 females, there were 92.3 males. For every 100 females age 18 and over, there were 83.8 males.

The median income for a household in the CDP was $45,625, and the median income for a family was $46,250. Males had a median income of $29,107 versus $22,500 for females. The per capita income for the CDP was $20,538.

Just 1.7% of the population lived below the poverty line; 6.3% of those who were aged sixty-four or older were living in poverty while no one under eighteen and no families were classified as impoverished.

== Education ==
The school district is Millville Area School District.
