= Kramer Covered Bridge No. 113 =

- U.S. National Register of Historic Places
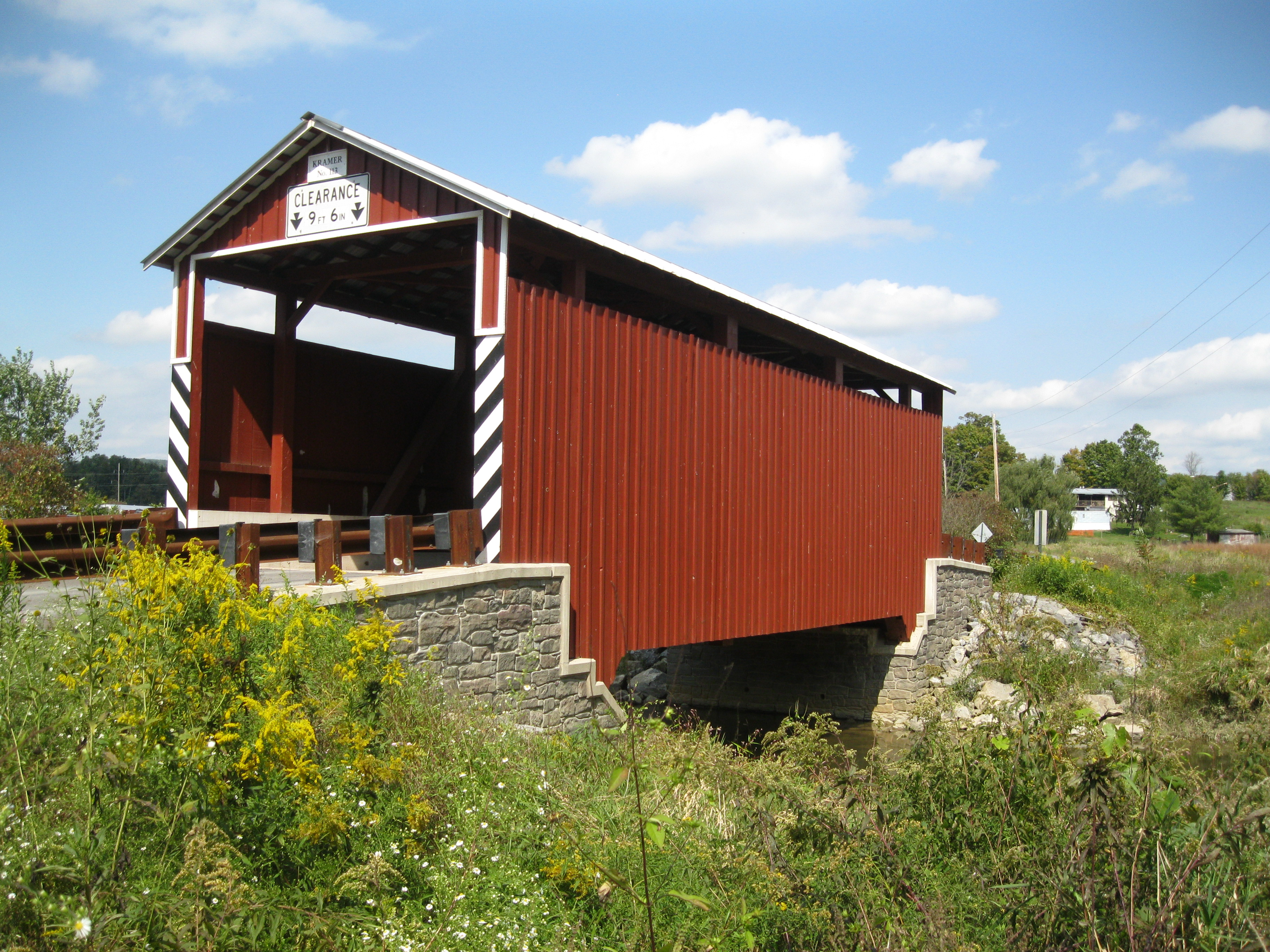
- The bridge in September 2012

- Location within Pennsylvania Location within the United States
- Location: Turkey Path Road, southwest of Rohrsburg, Greenwood Township, Pennsylvania
- Coordinates: 41°7′16″N 76°25′56″W
- Area: 0.1 acres (0.040 ha)
- Built: 1881
- Built by: C.W. Eves
- Architectural style: Queen Post Truss
- MPS: Covered Bridges of Columbia and Montour Counties TR
- NRHP reference No.: 79003194
- Added to NRHP: November 29, 1979

The Kramer Covered Bridge No. 113 is an historic, wooden covered bridge in Greenwood Township in Columbia County, Pennsylvania, United States. It crosses Mud Run.

It was listed on the National Register of Historic Places in 1979.

== History and architectural features ==
Built in 1881, this historic structure is a 50-foot-long (15 m), Queen Post Truss bridge with a metal roof constructed in 1881. It is one of twenty-eight historic covered bridges that are located in Columbia and Montour Counties.

This bridge was rebuilt in 2007.
