= Millville Area Junior Senior High School =

Coordinates: 41.12371°N 76.52703°W

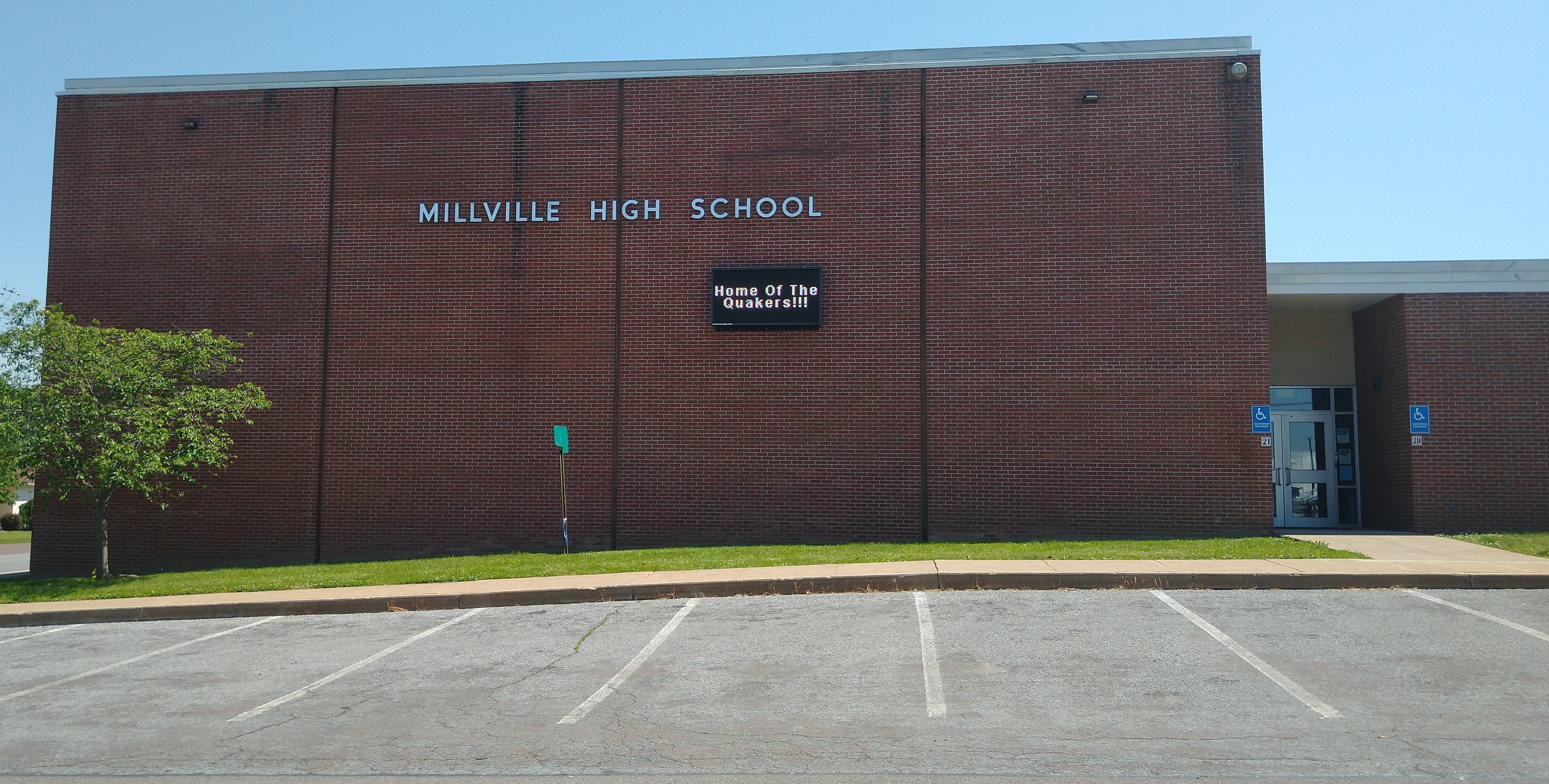
- Millville Area Junior Senior High School in June 2021

Location
- 345 School House Lane, Millville, Columbia County, Pennsylvania 17846; United States

Information
- Type: Public
- School district: Millville Area School District
- Principal: Mr. Matt Mills
- Teaching staff: 33.81 (FTE)
- Grades: 7 - 12
- Enrollment: 240 (2023-2024)
- Student to teacher ratio: 7.10
- Language: English
- Feeder schools: Millville Area Elementary School
- Website: Millville Area Junior Senior High School

Millville Area Junior Senior High School is a tiny, rural public school in Columbia County, Pennsylvania. It provides grades 7th through 12th. For the 2024–2025 school year, enrollment was reported as 234 pupils.

Millville Area Junior Senior High School is the only high school operated by the Millville Area School District. High school students may alternatively attend Columbia-Montour Area Vocational-Technical School for training in the trades. The Central Susquehanna Intermediate Unit (IU16) provides the district with a wide variety of services like specialized education for disabled students and hearing, speech and visual disability services and professional development for staff and faculty.

== Extracurriculars ==
The Millville Area School District offers a variety of clubs, activities and sports programs. Junior varsity and varsity athletic activities are under the Pennsylvania Interscholastic Athletic Association and the regional Pennsylvania Heartland Athletic Conference. The Pennsylvania Heartland Athletic Conference is a voluntary association of 25 PIAA High Schools within the central Pennsylvania region.

=== Sports ===
The district funds:

==== Senior high sports ====
Boys

- Baseball - A
- Basketball- A
- Soccer - A

Girls

- Basketball - A
- Soccer - A
- Softball - A

Junior high school sports

Boys

- Basketball
- Soccer

Girls

- Basketball
- Field hockey
- Soccer

According to PIAA directory July 2014
