= Patterson Covered Bridge No. 112 =

- U.S. National Register of Historic Places
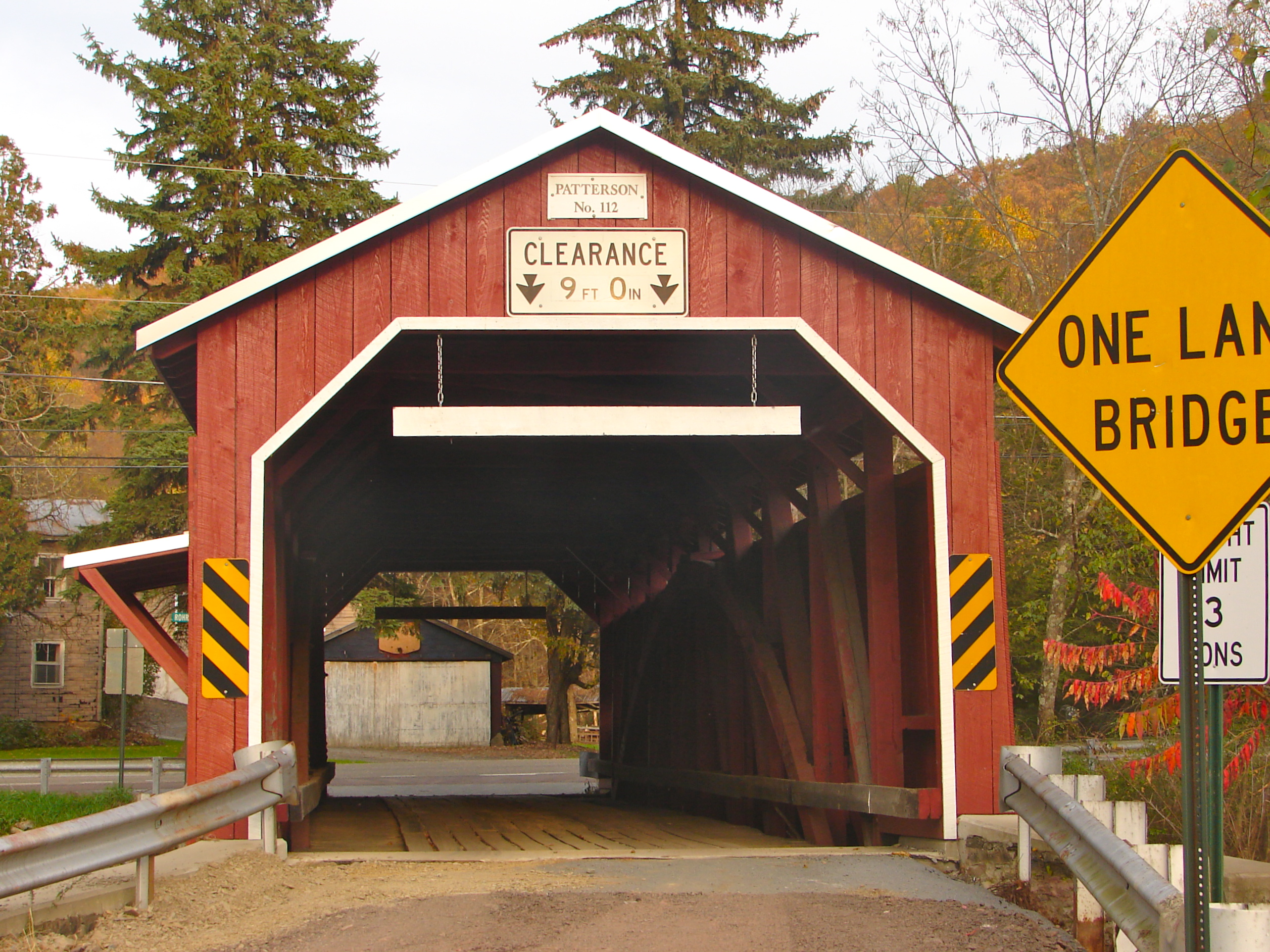
- Patterson Covered Bridge, October 2011

- Location within Pennsylvania Location within the United States
- Location: T-575, north of Orangeville, Orange Township, Pennsylvania
- Coordinates: 41°06′34″N 76°25′02″W
- Area: 0.1 acres (0.040 ha)
- Built: 1875
- Built by: Frank Derr
- Architectural style: Burr Truss-Arch
- MPS: Covered Bridges of Columbia and Montour Counties TR
- NRHP reference No.: 79003193
- Added to NRHP: November 29, 1979

The Patterson Covered Bridge No. 112 is a historic wooden covered bridge located at Orange Township in Columbia County, Pennsylvania. It is an 81.66-foot-long (24.89 m), Burr Truss arch bridge with a tarred metal roof constructed in 1875. It crosses Green Creek. It is one of 28 historic covered bridges in Columbia and Montour Counties.

It was listed on the National Register of Historic Places in 1979.
