= Columbia-Montour Area Vocational-Technical School =

Coordinates: 41.0287°N 76.3622°W

Columbia-Montour Area Vocational Technical School
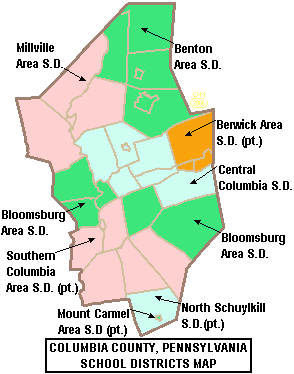

Location
- 5050 Sweppenheiser Drive; Bloomsburg, Columbia County, Pennsylvania 17815; United States

Information
- School type: Vocational School
- Opened: 1969
- Status: Open
- Principal: Susan Shipman (2016)
- Faculty: 43.5 teachers (2013)
- Grades: 9-12
- Enrollment: 617 (2023-2024)
- Language: English
- Colors: Green and Gold
- Sports: Football; Baseball; Soccer; Basketball; Wrestling; Bowling; Track; Cross Country; Cheerleading
- Mascot: Ram
- Newspaper: Ram Page
- Yearbook: Rambler
- Budget: $7,702,038 (2015-16)
- Website: http://www.cmvt.us

Columbia-Montour Area Vocational-Technical School is located in Bloomsburg, Pennsylvania, United States. It is a full-time area vocational-technical school that serves the youth of Columbia and Montour counties in Pennsylvania. CMAVTS offers 17 training areas to secondary students in grades 9 through 12. In ninth grade, students are put through an exploratory program where they go through four programs through the course of a school year. In tenth grade they choose their "major" to focus on, up until graduation in 12th grade. According to the National Center for Education Statistics, in 2010, the school reported an enrollment of 633 pupils. The school employed 43.5 teachers yielding a student teacher ratio of 14:1.

The school is an extension of the educational programs of the seven participating school districts. The option of vocational education at the Columbia-Montour AVTS gives students a full range of educational choices. In addition to the traditional high school student, they also offer education options to adults with evening and summers with their adult education classes.

Participating School Districts

- Benton Area School District
- Berwick Area School District
- Bloomsburg Area School District
- Central Columbia School District
- Danville Area School District
- Millville Area School District
- Southern Columbia Area School District

The school is governed by a board that is composed of one member of each of its participating districts. These individuals are appointed from the respective District's school board.

== Extracurriculars ==
Columbia-Montour AVTS offers a variety of clubs, activities and sports. Columbia-Montour AVTS has a Cooperative Agreement with Columbia-County Christian Academy, for all sports except the following: soccer, boys and girls basketball, and cheerleading.

=== Sports ===
The District funds:

Boys

- Baseball - AAA
- Basketball -AAA
- Bowling - AAAA
- Cross Country - AA
- Football - AAA
- Wrestling - AA

Girls

- Basketball - AA
- Bowling - AAAA
- Cheerleading
- Soccer (Fall) - A
- Softball - AA

=== Clubs ===
- National Honor Society (NHS)
- School Newspaper (RamPage)
- Students Against Drunk Driving (SADD)
- Envirothon
- Varsity Club
- Yearbook
- Skills USA (VICA)
- An Association of Marketing Students (DECA)
- Health Occupations Students of America (HOSA)
- Family, Career and Community Leaders of America (FCCLA)
- An Association of Agriculture Education Students (FFA)
