= Millville Area School District =

School district in Pennsylvania

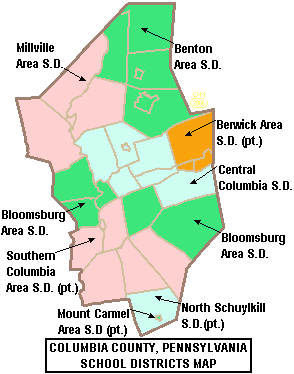

Address
- 330 Main Street Millville, Columbia County, Pennsylvania, 17846; United States

District information
- Type: Public

Other information
- Website: https://www.millsd.us/

Millville Area School District is a small, rural, public school district in Columbia County, Pennsylvania. It is centered in the borough of Millville and also serves the townships of Pine, Greenwood, and Madison. Millville Area School District encompasses approximately 91 square miles (240 km^{2}). According to 2000 federal census data, it served a resident population of 5,500. By 2010, the district's population rose to 5,563 people. The educational attainment levels for the Millville Area School District population (25 years old and over) were 87% high school graduates and 19.6% college graduates.

According to the Pennsylvania Budget and Policy Center, 38.8% of the district's pupils lived at 185% or below the Federal Poverty level as shown by their eligibility for the federal free or reduced price school meal programs in 2012. In 2009, Millville Area School District residents’ per capita income was $17,931, while the median family income was $41,867. In the Commonwealth, the median family income was $49,501 and the United States median family income was $49,445, in 2010.

Millville Area School District operates two schools: Millville Area Elementary School and Millville Area Junior Senior High School. Millville Area High School students may choose to attend Columbia-Montour Area Vocational-Technical School which provides training in the trades. The Central Susquehanna Intermediate Unit IU16 provides the district with a wide variety of services like specialized education for disabled students and hearing, speech and visual disability services and professional development for staff and faculty. The district is one of the 500 public school districts of Pennsylvania.

== Extracurriculars ==
The Millville Area School District offers a variety of clubs, activities and sports programs.

=== Sports ===
Junior varsity and varsity athletic activities are under the Pennsylvania Interscholastic Athletic Association and the regional Pennsylvania Heartland Athletic Conference. The district funds:

Boys

- Baseball - A
- Basketball- A
- Soccer - A

Girls

- Basketball - AA
- Field hockey - AA
- Soccer - A
- Softball - A

Junior high school sports

Boys

- Basketball
- Soccer

Girls

- Basketball
- Field hockey

According to PIAA directory July 2012
