= Pennsylvania Route 254 =

State highway in Pennsylvania, US

Pennsylvania Route 254

Route information
- Maintained by PennDOT
- Length: 30.159 mi (48.536 km)

Major junctions
- West end: PA 405 in Milton
- PA 147 in Milton; I-80 in Turbot Township; PA 54 in Washingtonville; PA 44 in Madison Township; PA 42 in Millville
- East end: PA 487 near Benton

Location
- Country: United States
- State: Pennsylvania
- Counties: Northumberland, Montour, Columbia

Highway system
- Pennsylvania State Route System; Interstate; US; State; Scenic; Legislative
| ← PA 253 | → PA 255 |

Pennsylvania Route 254 (PA 254) is a 30-mile-long (48 km) state highway located in Northumberland, Montour, and Columbia counties in Pennsylvania. The western terminus is at PA 405 in Milton. The eastern terminus is at PA 487 near Benton.

== Route description ==
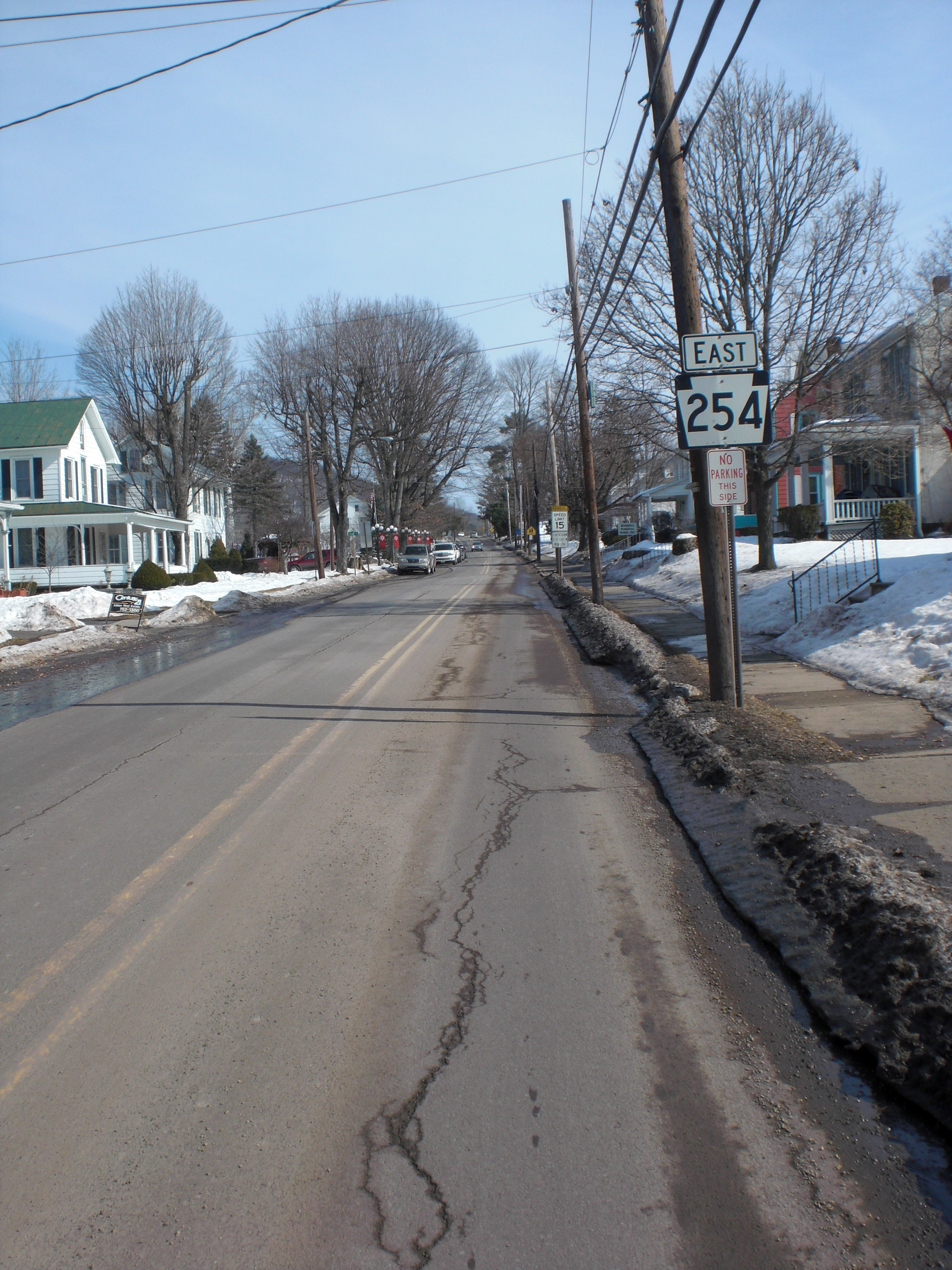
PA 254 looking east in Millville

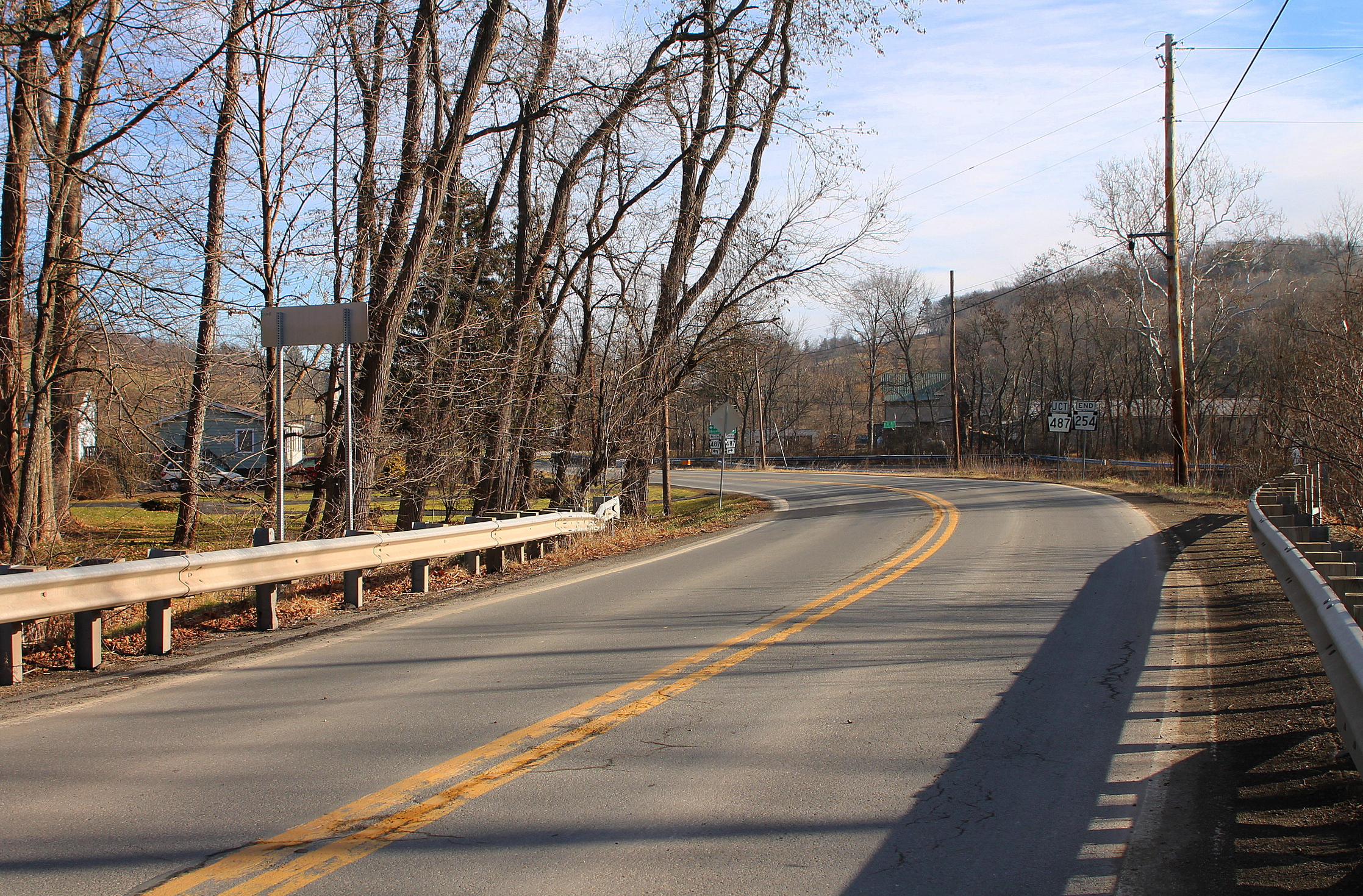
Eastern terminus of PA 254 at PA 487 near Benton

PA 254 begins at an intersection with PA 405 in the borough of Milton in Northumberland County, heading east on two-lane undivided Broadway Street. The road passes through the commercial downtown, crossing Norfolk Southern's Buffalo Line and heading into residential areas. The road heads into Turbot Township and becomes Broadway, reaching an interchange with the PA 147 freeway. Past this, PA 254 becomes an unnamed road and runs through agricultural areas with some woods and homes. The road comes to an interchange with Interstate 80 (I-80), at which point it is a four-lane divided highway, before turning back into a two-lane undivided road and heading northeast through open farmland with occasional residences. The route heads east-northeast into Limestone Township in Montour County and becomes Broadway, running through more rural areas. PA 254 enters Derry Township and becomes Washingtonville Road, crossing the Chillisquaque Creek before coming to an intersection with PA 54 to the south of the borough of Washingtonville. The road heads northeast through more farmland with some woods and homes, turning to the east.

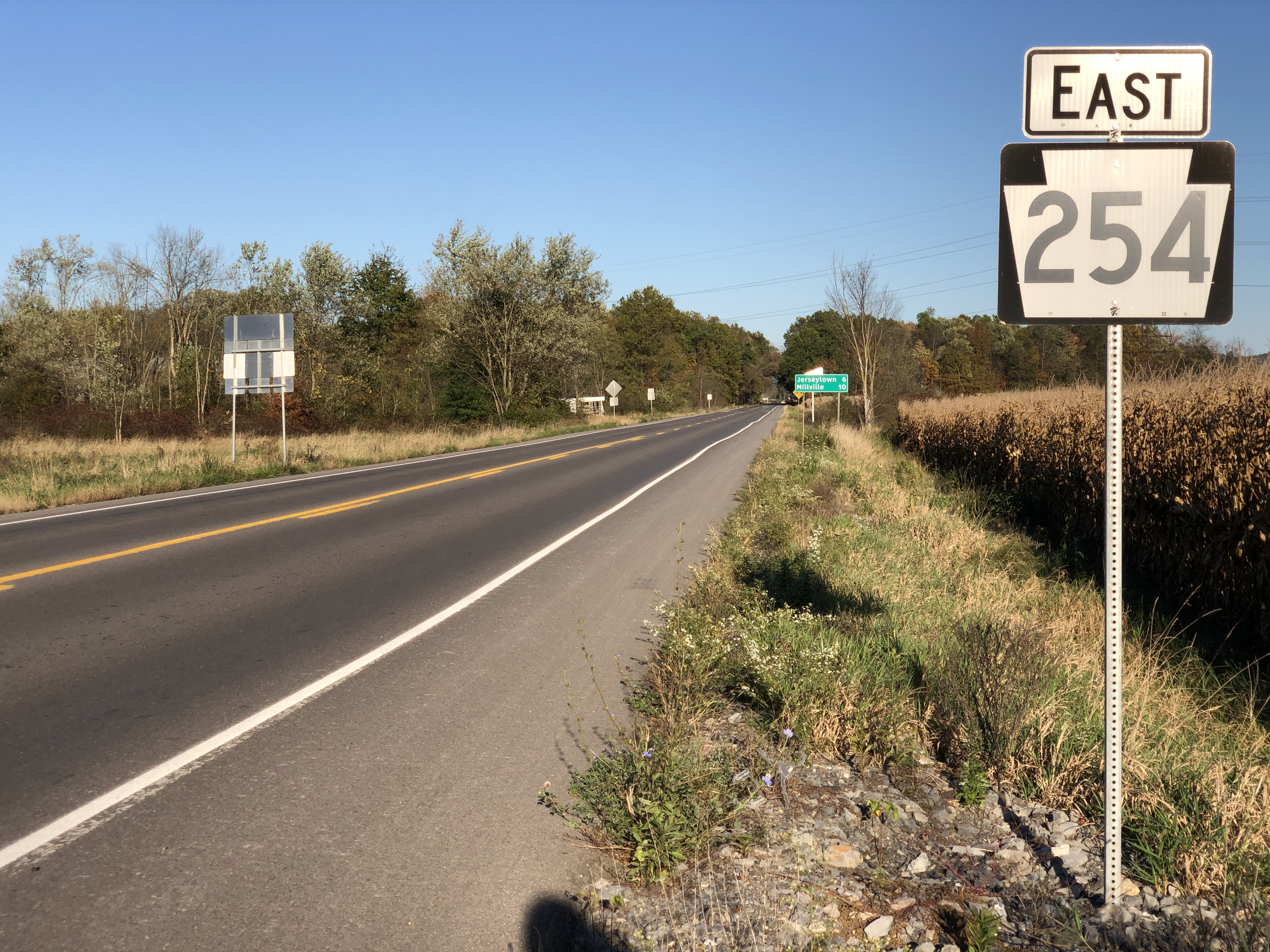
PA 254 eastbound past PA 54 in Derry Township

PA 254 enters Madison Township in Columbia County, running northeast through more rural areas and coming to an intersection with PA 44 and the eastern terminus of PA 642 in the community of Jerseytown. The road becomes Jerseytown Road and continues through more farmland and woodland with occasional residences, with the name changing to Rohrsburg Road. The route crosses the Little Fishing Creek into the borough of Millville and becomes West Main Street, passing residential and commercial areas as it intersects PA 42. Following this intersection, PA 254 becomes East Main Street and heads past homes before turning east and crossing into Greenwood Township, where it becomes Rohrsburg Road again. The road heads through open agricultural areas with some woods and residences, reaching the residential community of Rohrsburg. Here, the route turns sharply north to continue along Rohrsburg Road and passes through more farmland before turning northeast into a mix of farmland and woodland, passing through a corner of Fishing Creek Township before heading into Benton Township. PA 254 curves to the east and crosses Fishing Creek prior to passing north of a park and ride lot and ending at an intersection with PA 487.

== Major intersections ==
| County | Location | mi | km | Destinations | Notes |
|---|---|---|---|---|---|
| Northumberland | Milton | 0.000 | 0.000 | PA 405 south (South Front Street) | Western terminus of PA 254; southbound direction of PA 405 one-way pair |
| Northumberland | Milton | 0.108 | 0.174 | PA 405 north (Arch Street) | Northbound direction of PA 405 one-way pair |
| Northumberland | Turbot Township | 1.080– 1.162 | 1.738– 1.870 | PA 147 (Susquehanna Trail) – Williamsport, Sunbury | Interchange |
| Northumberland | Turbot Township | 3.195– 3.404 | 5.142– 5.478 | I-80 – Williamsport, Bloomsburg | I-80 exit 215 |
| Montour | Derry Township | 9.938 | 15.994 | PA 54 (Continental Boulevard) – Turbotville, Danville | |
| Columbia | Madison Township | 15.859 | 25.523 | PA 44 / PA 642 west (White Hall Road / Danville Road) – Turbotville, Danville | Eastern terminus of PA 642 |
| Columbia | Millville | 19.427 | 31.265 | PA 42 (State Street) – Eagles Mere, Bloomsburg | |
| Columbia | Benton Township | 30.159 | 48.536 | PA 487 (Maple Grove Road) – Benton, Bloomsburg | Eastern terminus of PA 254 |
1.000 mi = 1.609 km; 1.000 km = 0.621 mi
