= Rohrsburg, Pennsylvania =

Unincorporated community in Pennsylvania, US

- Census-designated place
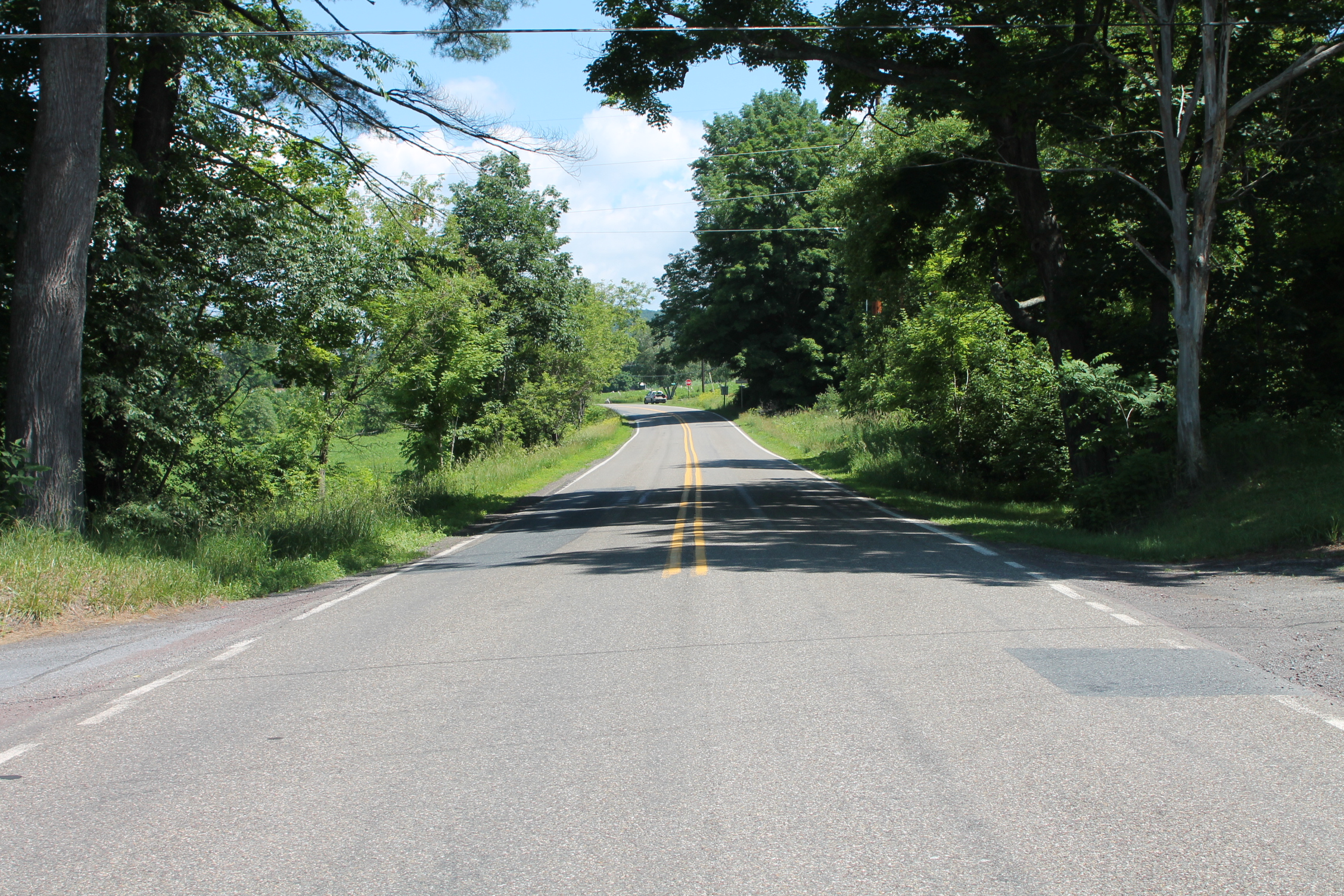
- Rohrsburg Road on the southeastern edge of town

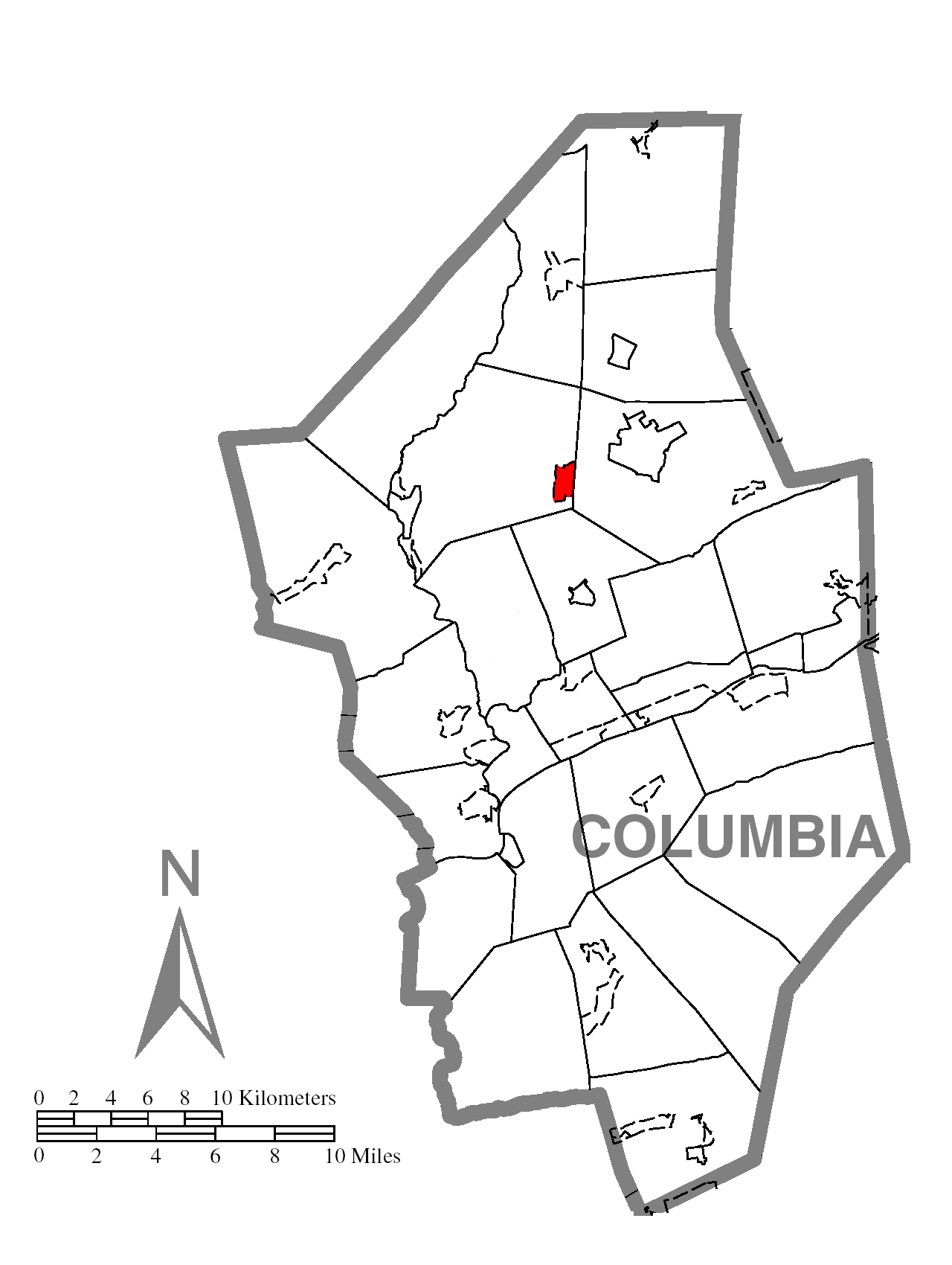
- Location within Columbia County

- Location within the U.S. state of Pennsylvania Rohrsburg (the United States)
- Coordinates: 41°08′0″N 76°25′19″W
- Country: United States
- State: Pennsylvania
- County: Columbia
- Township: Greenwood

Area
  - Total: 0.75 sq mi (1.93 km^{2})
  - Land: 0.74 sq mi (1.91 km^{2})
  - Water: 0.0077 sq mi (0.02 km^{2})
- Elevation: 661 ft (201 m)

Population (2020)
  - Total: 150
  - Density: 203.0/sq mi (78.37/km^{2})
- Time zone: UTC-5 (Eastern (EST))
  - Summer (DST): UTC-4 (EDT)
- ZIP Code: 17859
- FIPS code: 42-65872
- GNIS feature ID: 1185401

Rohrsburg is a census-designated place (CDP) in Columbia County, Pennsylvania, United States. It is part of Northeastern Pennsylvania. The population was 150 at the 2020 census. It is part of the Bloomsburg-Berwick micropolitan area.

== History ==
Rohrsburg's name comes from the Prussian Frederick Rohr, who gained the site in 1825 from Samuel Sherts. In 1826, Rohrsburg consisted solely of a wheelwright's shop, but over the next few years some businesses developed in the area. Other early industries built in the Rohrsburg area include a sawmill built in 1820, a fulling and carding-mill built in 1832, and a pottery built in 1847. The Susquehanna, Bloomsburg, and Berwick Railroad had a station in Rohrsburg in the late 19th and early 20th centuries.

== Geography ==
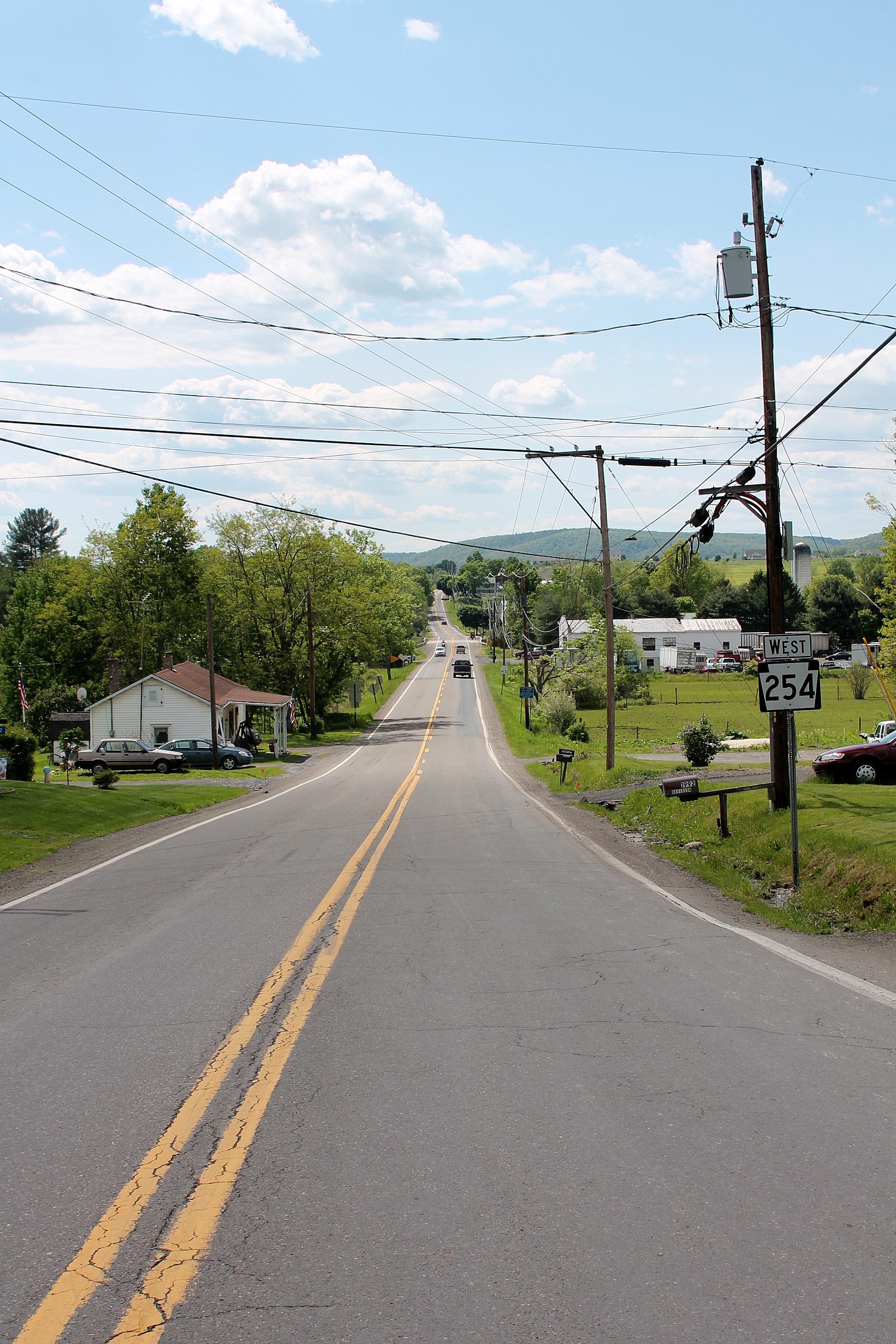
Pennsylvania Route 254 looking west in Rohrsburg

Rohrsburg is located in northern Columbia County at 41°07′59″N 76°25′18″W (41.133116, -76.421646), in the southeast part of Greenwood Township. According to the U.S. Census Bureau, Rohrsburg has a total area of 0.71 square miles (1.85 km^{2}), of which 0.71 square miles (1.83 km^{2}) is land and 0.01 square miles (0.02 km^{2}), or 0.85%, is water.

Rohrsburg is mostly flat with some hills in the northeast. Little Green Creek flows into Green Creek, a tributary of Fishing Creek, in the CDP. Rohrsurg is almost entirely farmland with some woods along Green Creek and some houses near Pennsylvania Route 254 where it passes through the CDP.

== Demographics ==
Historical population
Census	Pop.	Note	%±
2020	150		—
U.S. Decennial Census

As of the census of 2000, there were 164 people, 56 households, and 50 families residing in the CDP. The population density was 221.3 inhabitants per square mile (85.4/km^{2}). There were 59 housing units at an average density of 79.6 per square mile (30.7/km^{2}). The racial makeup of the CDP was 96.34% White, 0.61% African American, 0.61% Asian, and 2.44% from two or more races. Hispanic or Latino of any race were 2.44% of the population.

There were 56 households, out of which 37.5% had children under the age of 18 living with them, 80.4% were married couples living together, 3.6% had a female householder with no husband present, and 10.7% were non-families. 10.7% of all households were made up of individuals, and 1.8% had someone living alone who was 65 years of age or older. The average household size was 2.93 and the average family size was 3.10.

In the CDP, the population was spread out, with 25.6% under the age of 18, 6.1% from 18 to 24, 29.3% from 25 to 44, 25.0% from 45 to 64, and 14.0% who were 65 years of age or older. The median age was 37 years. For every 100 females, there were 107.6 males. For every 100 females age 18 and over, there were 106.8 males.

The median income for a household in the CDP was $40,625, and the median income for a family was $41,250. Males had a median income of $27,083 versus $30,417 for females. The per capita income for the CDP was $14,597. About 2.3% of families and 5.9% of the population were below the poverty line, including 7.9% of those under the age of eighteen and none of those sixty-five or over.

== Education ==
The school district is Millville Area School District.

The nearest college to Rohrsburg with over 2,000 students is the Bloomsburg University of Pennsylvania.

== Climate ==
The average high temperature in January in Rohrsburg is 34 °F and the average low temperature is 19 °F. The average high temperature in July in Rohrsburg is 84 °F and the average low temperature is 62 °F. The highest temperature ever recorded in Rohrsburg was 106 °F in July 1936. The lowest temperature ever recorded in Rohrsburg was -20°F in January 1994.

Rohrsburg's wettest month is June, which has an average of over 4.5 inches of rain. The CDP's driest month is February, with slightly over 2 inches of rain on average.
