= Madison Township, Columbia County, Pennsylvania =

Township in Pennsylvania, US

Coordinates: 41°08′00″N 76°35′59″W

- Township
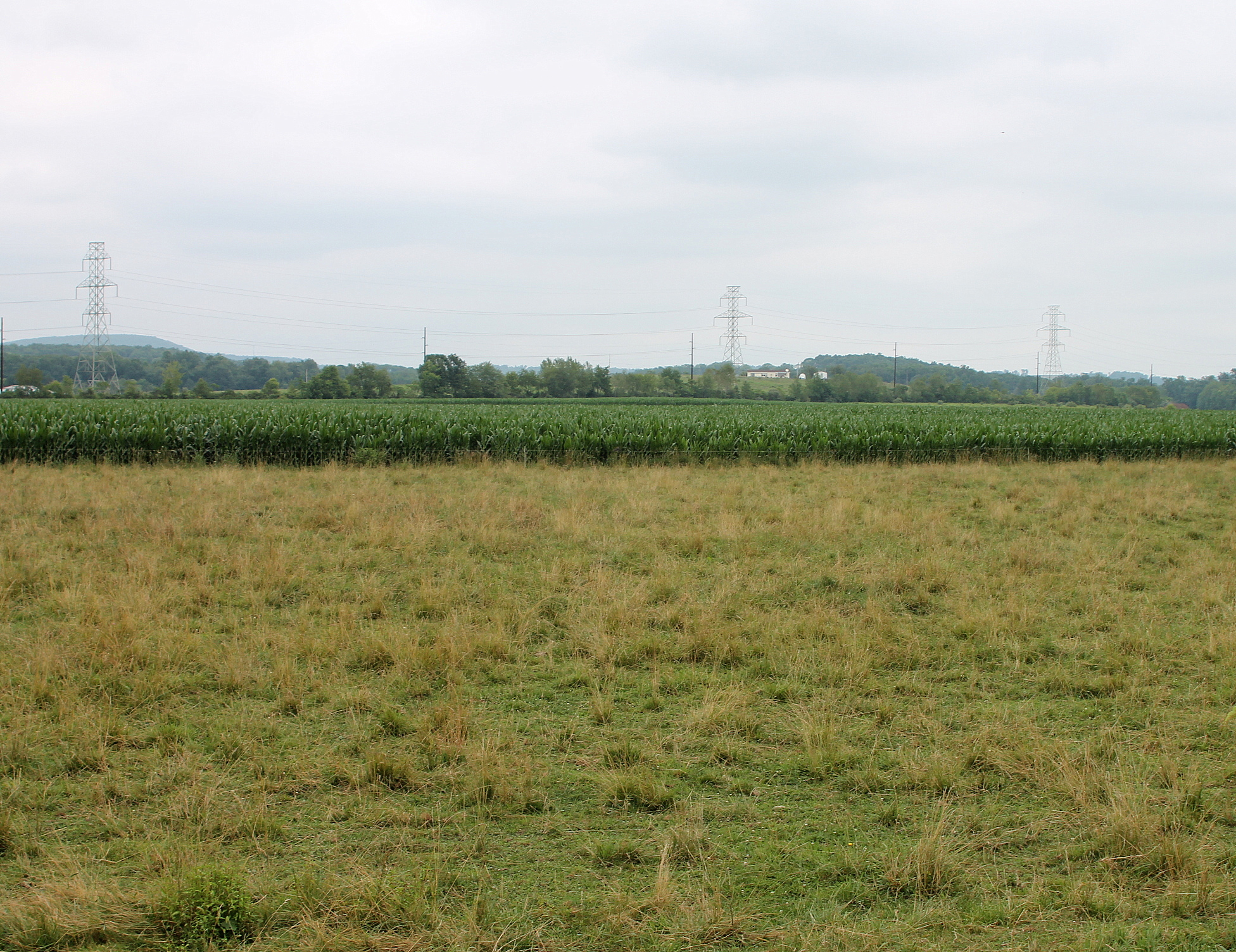
- Field in Madison Township

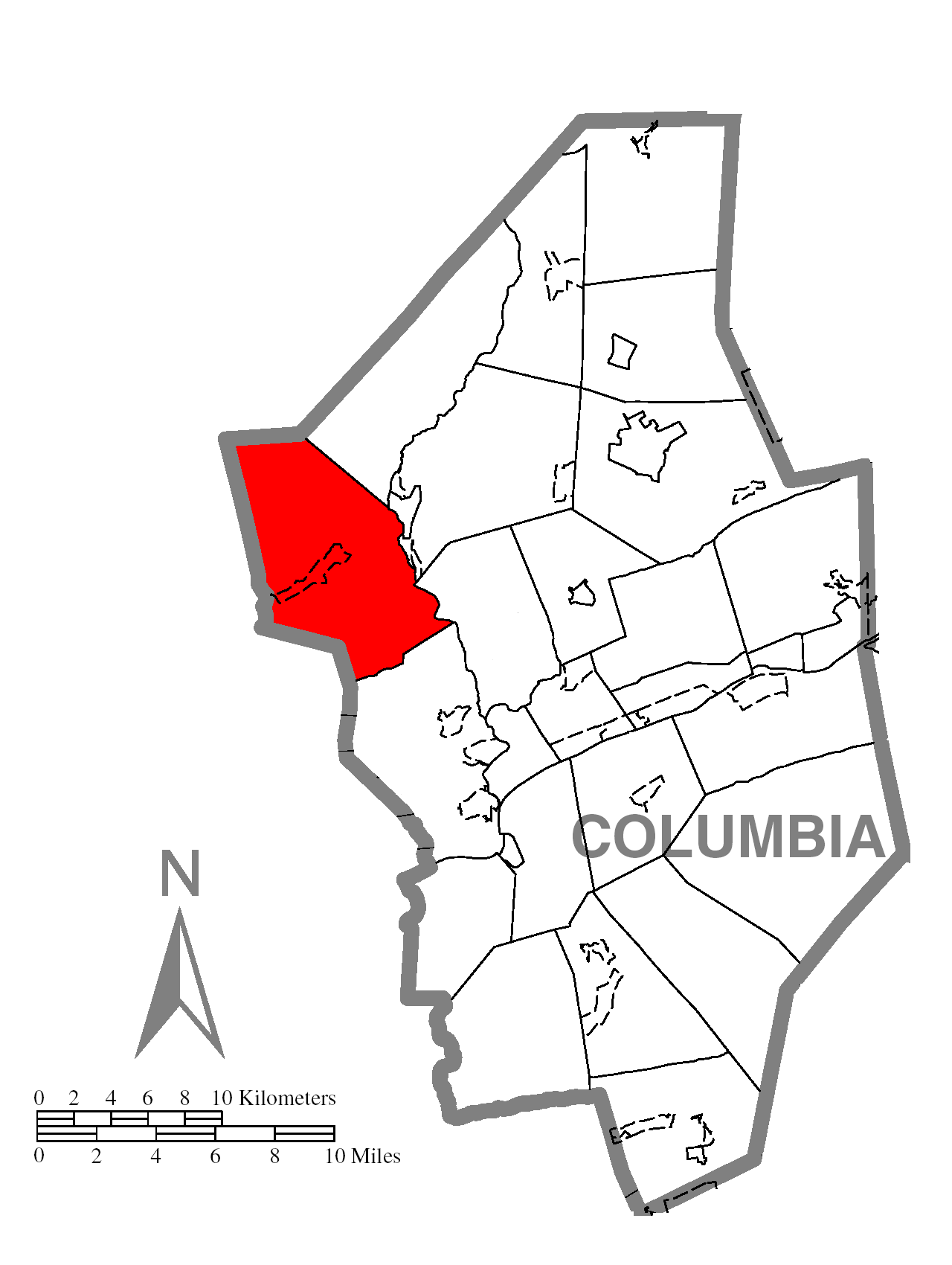
- Map of Columbia County, Pennsylvania highlighting Madison Township

- Map of Columbia County, Pennsylvania
- Country: United States
- State: Pennsylvania
- County: Columbia
- Settled: 1772
- Incorporated: 1817

Area
  - Total: 35.26 sq mi (91.32 km^{2})
  - Land: 35.15 sq mi (91.05 km^{2})
  - Water: 0.10 sq mi (0.27 km^{2})

Population (2020)
  - Total: 1,566 ▼
  - Estimate (2021): 1,567
  - Density: 45.4/sq mi (17.53/km^{2})
- Time zone: UTC-5 (Eastern (EST))
  - Summer (DST): UTC-4 (EDT)
- Area code: 570
- FIPS code: 42-037-46472
- Website: www.madisontwpcol.com

Madison Township is a township in Columbia County, Pennsylvania. It is part of Northeastern Pennsylvania. The population was 1,566 at the 2020 census.

== Geography ==
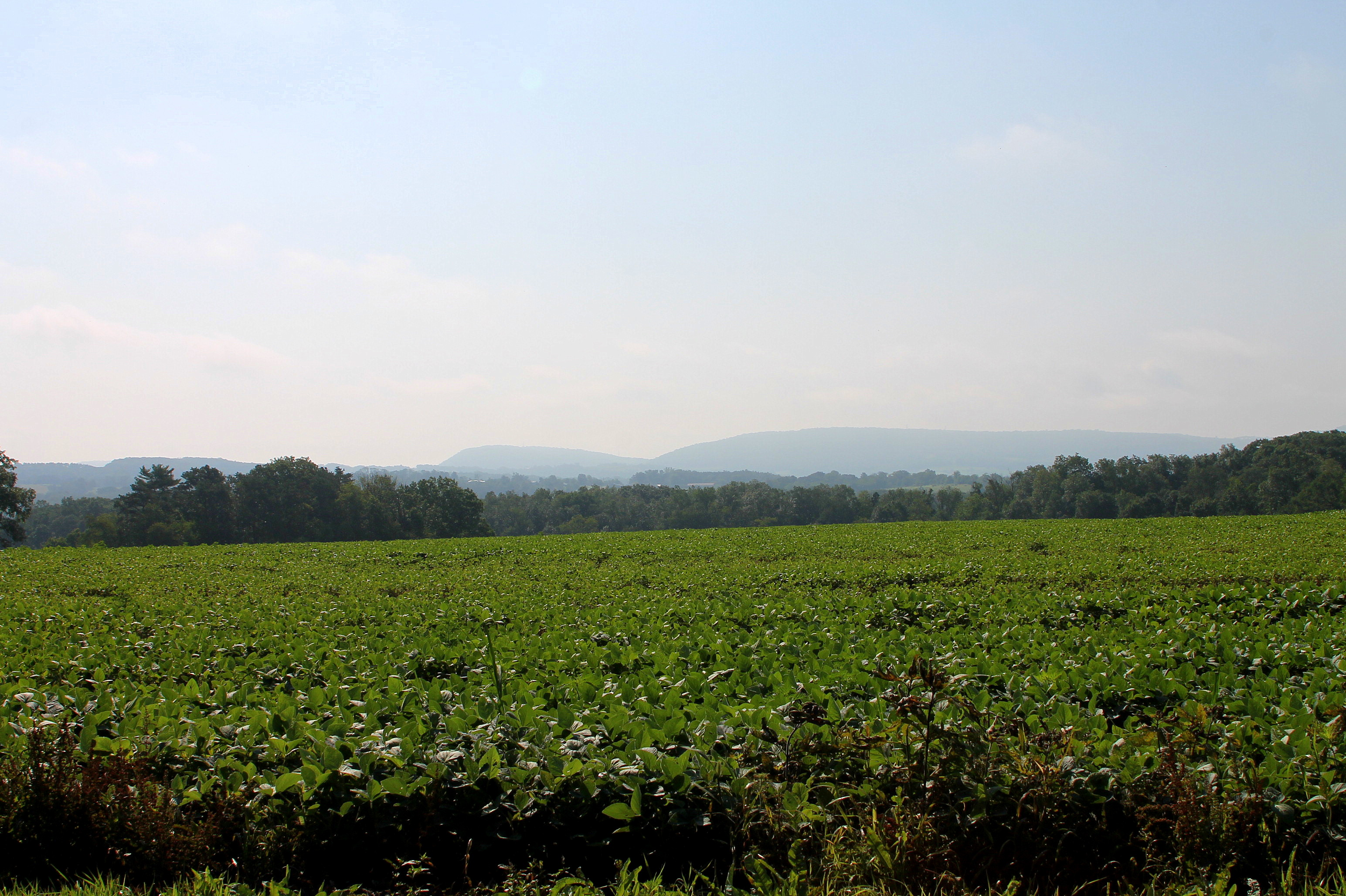
Field in Madison Township looking east near the Montour County line

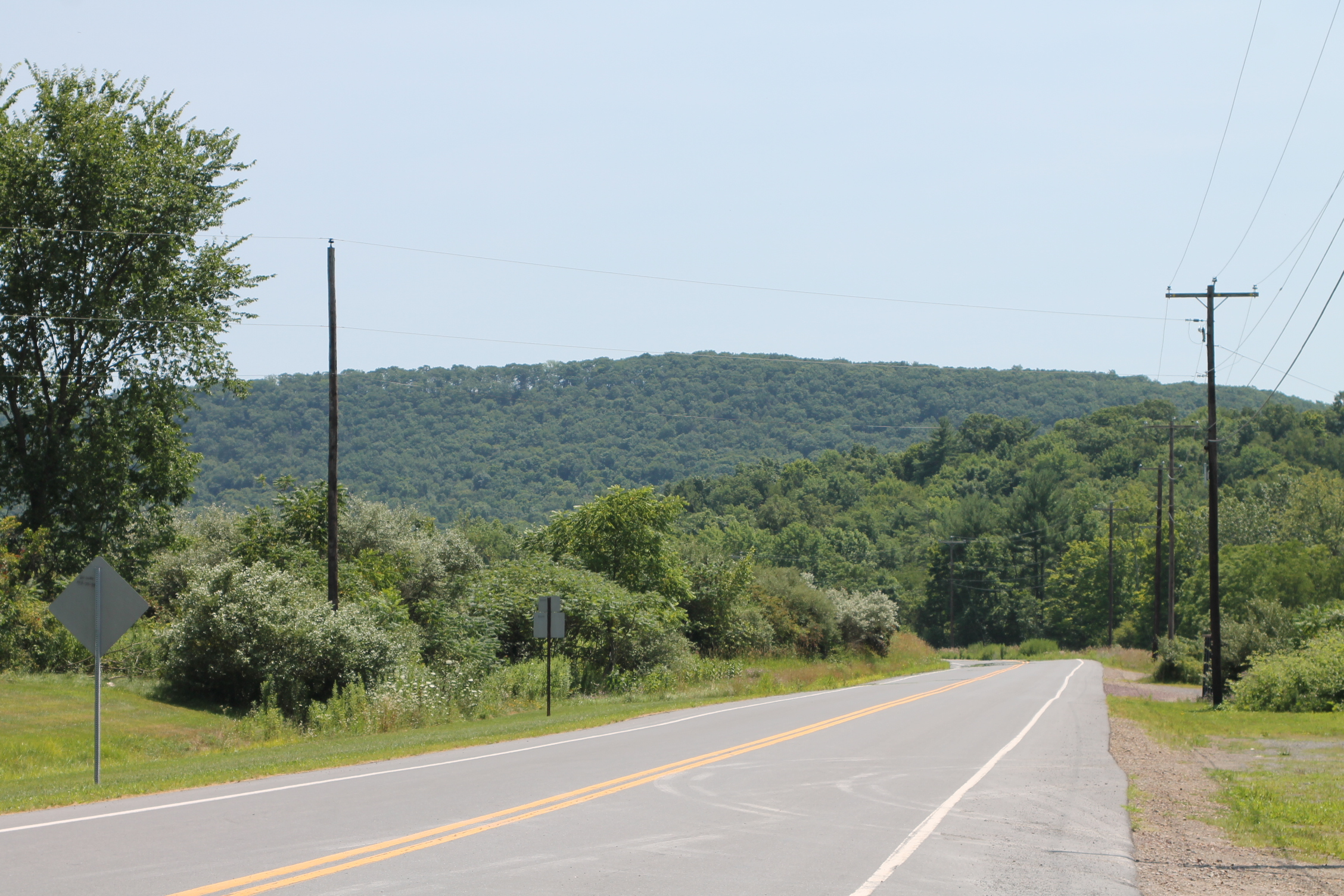
Eyersgrove Road and a hill in Madison Township

Madison Township is in northwestern Columbia County, bordered by Lycoming County to the north, Montour County to the west, and Hemlock Township.

According to the United States Census Bureau, the township has a total area of 35.3 square miles (91.3 km^{2}), of which 35.2 square miles (91.1 km^{2}) is land and 0.1 square miles (0.3 km^{2}), or 0.30%, is water. The eastern boundary of the township is formed by Little Fishing Creek, which flows south towards Fishing Creek and the Susquehanna River. The west-center part of the township is in a valley which drains westward to Chillisquaque Creek, a tributary of the West Branch Susquehanna River.

The township contains the census-designated place of Jerseytown.

== Demographics ==
Historical population
Census	Pop.	Note	%±
2010	1,605		—
2020	1,566		−2.4%
2021 (est.)	1,567		0.1%
U.S. Decennial Census

As of the census of 2000, there were 1,590 people, 591 households, and 484 families residing in the township. The population density was 45.1 inhabitants per square mile (17.4/km^{2}). There were 644 housing units at an average density of 18.3 units per square mile (7.1 units/km^{2}). The racial makeup of the township was 98.99% White, 0.19% African American, 0.19% Native American, 0.13% Asian, and 0.50% from two or more races. Hispanic or Latino of any race were 0.38% of the population.

There were 591 households, out of which 28.6% had children under the age of 18 living with them, 72.3% were married couples living together, 5.9% had a female householder with no husband present, and 18.1% were non-families. 14.4% of all households were made up of individuals, and 4.2% had someone living alone who was 65 years of age or older. The average household size was 2.68 and the average family size was 2.92.

In the township the population was spread out, with 21.4% under the age of 18, 8.1% from 18 to 24, 26.5% from 25 to 44, 30.4% from 45 to 64, and 13.5% who were 65 years of age or older. The median age was 42 years. For every 100 females, there were 95.8 males. For every 100 females age 18 and over, there were 97.3 males.

The median income for a household in the township was $38,819, and the median income for a family was $41,853. Males had a median income of $30,288 versus $25,000 for females. The per capita income for the township was $19,196. About 5.7% of families and 9.6% of the population were below the poverty line, including 15.9% of those under age 18 and 5.9% of those age 65 or over.
