= List of enclaves in Pennsylvania =

In political geography, an enclave is a piece of land entirely surrounded by the territory of another equivalent-level entity (and only that entity). An exclave is a piece of land that is politically connected to a larger piece but not physically conterminous with it because the territory of other equivalent-level entity or entities entirely surround it. Many entities are both enclaves and exclaves.

In Pennsylvania, every county in the state, other than the counties of Fulton, Philadelphia, Pike and Union, contains at least one municipality surrounded completely by another municipality. While Pennsylvania's urban counties contain few enclaves due to municipal fragmentation, rural areas feature numerous enclaved municipalities. Many resulted from small town centers separating from their rural surrounding areas.

There are at least 338 enclaves (that are not exclaves) in Pennsylvania comprising incorporated places and census-designated places (CDP) within other county subdivisions. Of these, 260 are boroughs (out of 957 in the state), 75 are CDPs (out of 749), two are townships (out of 1547) and one is a city (out of 57). Although each CDP is technically a part of the township(s) in which it is located, these two types of subdivision are considered to be distinct entities.

Usually, the enclave (that is not an exclave) takes the form of a borough that is surrounded by the township of which it was originally a part, but other scenarios are possible, e.g.,

- the borough of Mount Oliver is an enclave of the city of Pittsburgh;
- Pitcairn borough, of the municipality of Monroeville;
- Dale borough, of the city of Johnstown;
- Export borough, of the borough of Murrysville;
- both New Galilee and Homewood boroughs, of the borough of Big Beaver;
- the Lackawanna County township of Elmhurst, of Roaring Brook Township;
- the Tioga County township of Putnam, of Covington Township.

== Pennsylvania enclaves that are not exclaves ==
- Adams County
  - Aspers, CDP
  - Bendersville, borough
  - Biglerville, borough
  - Bonneauville, borough
  - Fairfield, borough
  - Hampton, CDP
  - New Oxford, borough
- Allegheny County
  - Curtisville, CDP
  - Mount Oliver, borough
  - Pennsbury Village, borough
  - Pitcairn, borough
  - West View, borough
- Armstrong County
  - Dayton, borough
  - Elderton, borough
  - Rural Valley, borough
  - Worthington, borough
- Beaver County
  - Darlington, borough
  - Homewood, borough
  - Hookstown, borough
  - New Galilee, borough
- Bedford County
  - Bedford, borough
  - Coaldale, borough
  - Everett, borough
  - Hyndman, borough
  - New Paris, borough
  - Pleasantville, borough
  - Rainsburg, borough
  - Saxton, borough
  - Schellsburg, borough
  - St. Clairsville, borough
  - Woodbury, borough
- Berks County
  - Amity Gardens, CDP
  - Bally, borough
  - Centerport, borough
  - Flying Hills, CDP
  - Kutztown, borough
  - Laureldale, borough
  - Lenhartsville, borough
  - Mohnton, borough
  - Strausstown, former borough
- Blair County
  - Bellwood, borough
  - Martinsburg, borough
  - Roaring Spring, borough
  - Tipton, CDP
  - Tyrone, borough
- Bradford County
  - Canton, borough
  - Le Raysville, borough
  - Monroe, borough
  - Rome, borough
  - Sylvania, borough
  - Troy, borough
- Bucks County
  - Newtown, borough
  - Richlandtown, borough
  - Silverdale, borough
  - Trumbauersville, borough
  - Woodside, CDP
- Butler County
  - Bruin, borough
  - East Butler, borough
  - Fairview, borough
  - Harrisville, borough
  - Karns City, borough
  - Mars, borough
  - Nixon, CDP
  - West Sunbury, borough
- Cambria County
  - Dale, borough
  - Ebensburg, borough
  - Lilly, borough
  - Loretto, borough
  - University of Pittsburgh Johnstown, CDP
  - Wilmore, borough
- Cameron County
  - Driftwood, borough
  - Emporium, borough
- Carbon County
  - Beaver Meadows, borough
- Centre County
  - Bellefonte, borough
  - Centre Hall, borough
  - Coburn, CDP
  - Howard, borough
  - Julian, CDP
  - Madisonburg, CDP
  - Milesburg, borough
  - Pine Glen, CDP
  - Port Matilda, borough
  - Rebersburg, CDP
  - Sandy Ridge, CDP
  - Spring Mills, CDP
  - Stormstown, CDP
  - Unionville, borough
  - Woodward, CDP
- Chester County
  - Chesterbrook, CDP
  - Honey Brook, borough
  - Kennett Square, borough
  - Toughkenamon, CDP
  - West Grove, borough
- Clarion County
  - Callensburg, borough
  - Knox, borough
  - Shippenville, borough
  - St. Petersburg, borough
  - Strattanville, borough
- Clearfield County
  - Coalport, borough
  - Curwensville, borough
  - Grampian, borough
  - Hyde, CDP
  - Irvona, borough
  - Mahaffey, borough
  - Troutville, borough
- Clinton County
  - Avis, borough
  - Loganton, borough
- Columbia County
  - Benton, borough
  - Buckhorn, CDP
  - Centralia, borough
  - Jamison City, CDP
  - Jerseytown, CDP
  - Jonestown, CDP
  - Mainville, CDP
  - Mifflinville, CDP
  - Orangeville, borough
  - Slabtown, CDP
  - Stillwater, borough
- Crawford County
  - Adamsville, CDP
  - Atlantic, CDP
  - Cambridge Springs, borough
  - Canadohta Lake, CDP
  - Geneva, CDP
  - Guys Mills, CDP
  - Harmonsburg, CDP
  - Hydetown, borough
  - Lincolnville, CDP
  - Linesville, borough
  - Spartansburg, borough
  - Springboro, borough
  - Townville, borough
- Cumberland County
  - Mount Holly Springs, borough
  - New Kingstown, CDP
  - Newburg, borough
  - Plainfield, CDP
- Dauphin County
  - Berrysburg, borough
  - Dauphin, borough
  - Elizabethville, borough
  - Gratz, borough
  - Halifax, borough
  - Millersburg, borough
  - Skyline View, CDP
  - Williamstown, borough
- Delaware County
  - East Lansdowne, borough
  - Lima, CDP
- Elk County
  - Johnsonburg, borough
  - Ridgway, borough
- Erie County
  - Albion, borough
  - Edinboro, borough
  - McKean, borough
  - Mill Village, borough
  - North East, borough
  - Union City, borough
  - Waterford, borough
- Fayette County
  - Dunbar, borough
  - Fairchance, borough
  - Markleysburg, borough
  - Ohiopyle, borough
  - Perryopolis, borough
  - Smithfield, borough
  - Vanderbilt, borough
- Forest County
  - Tionesta, borough
- Franklin County
  - Greencastle, borough
  - Mont Alto, borough
  - Orrstown, borough
- Greene County
  - Jefferson, borough
- Huntingdon County
  - Alexandria, borough
  - Cassville, borough
  - Coalmont, borough
  - Dudley, borough
  - Orbisonia, borough
  - Rockhill Furnace, borough
  - Saltillo, borough
  - Shade Gap, borough
  - Shirleysburg, borough
  - Three Springs, borough
- Indiana County
  - Armagh, borough
  - Clymer, borough
  - Commodore, CDP
  - Creekside, borough
  - Ernest, borough
  - Marion Center, borough
  - Plumville, borough
  - Shelocta, borough
  - Smicksburg, borough
- Jefferson County
  - Brockway, borough
  - Reynoldsville, borough
  - Summerville, borough
- Juniata County
  - McAlisterville, CDP
  - Mexico, CDP
  - Mifflin, borough
  - Mifflintown, borough
  - Thompsontown, borough
- Lackawanna County
  - Elmhurst Township, township
- Lancaster County
  - Lititz, borough
  - Maytown, CDP
  - New Holland, borough
  - Strasburg, borough
  - Terre Hill, borough
- Lawrence County
  - Bessemer, borough
  - S.N.P.J. (Slovenska Narodna Podporna Jednota (Slovene National Benefit Society)), borough
- Lebanon County
  - Myerstown, borough
  - Schaefferstown, CDP
- Lehigh County
  - Alburtis, borough
  - Ancient Oaks, CDP
- Luzerne County
  - Ashley, borough
  - Bear Creek Village, borough
  - Conyngham, borough
  - Freeland, borough
- Lycoming County
  - Hughesville, borough
  - Muncy, borough
  - Salladasburg, borough
- McKean County
  - Eldred, borough
  - Kane, borough
  - Mount Jewett, borough
  - Port Allegany, borough
  - Smethport, borough
- Mercer County
  - Jackson Center, borough
  - Sandy Lake, borough
  - Sheakleyville, borough
  - West Middlesex, borough
- Mifflin County
  - Belleville, CDP
  - Juniata Terrace, borough
  - Milroy, CDP
  - Newton Hamilton, borough
- Monroe County
  - Brodheadsville, CDP
  - Mountainhome, CDP
- Montgomery County
  - Hatfield, borough
  - Narberth, borough
  - North Wales, borough
- Montour County
  - Washingtonville, borough
- Northampton County
  - Chapman, borough
  - Pen Argyl, borough
- Northumberland County
  - McEwensville, borough
  - Mount Carmel, borough
  - Sunbury, city
  - Turbotville, borough
- Perry County
  - Blain, borough
  - Bloomfield, borough
  - Landisburg, borough
- Potter County
  - Coudersport, borough
- Schuylkill County
  - Beurys Lake, CDP
  - Deer Lake, borough
  - Delano, CDP
  - Friedensburg, CDP
  - Girardville, borough
  - Gordon, borough
  - Heckscherville, CDP
  - Hometown, CDP
  - Lavelle, CDP
  - Mahanoy City, borough
  - McKeansburg, CDP
  - Middleport, borough
  - New Philadelphia, borough
  - New Ringgold, borough
  - Oneida, CDP
  - Renningers, CDP
  - Ringtown, borough
  - Sheppton, CDP
- Snyder County
  - Beavertown, borough
  - Freeburg, borough
  - Middleburg, borough
  - Paxtonville, CDP
  - Troxelville, CDP
- Somerset County
  - Addison, borough
  - Berlin, borough
  - Boswell, borough
  - Cairnbrook, CDP
  - Central City, borough
  - Davidsville, CDP
  - Edie, CDP
  - Friedens, CDP
  - Indian Lake, borough
  - Jennerstown, borough
  - Meyersdale, borough
  - New Centerville, borough
  - Salisbury, borough
  - Shanksville, borough
  - Somerset, borough
  - Stoystown, borough
  - Ursina, borough
- Sullivan County
  - Dushore, borough
  - Eagles Mere, borough
  - Laporte, borough
- Susquehanna County
  - Great Bend, borough
  - Hallstead, borough
  - Montrose, borough
  - New Milford, borough
  - Thompson, borough
- Tioga County
  - Knoxville, borough
  - Liberty, borough
  - Mansfield, borough
  - Putnam Township, township
  - Roseville, borough
  - Tioga, borough
  - Westfield, borough
- Venango County
  - Clintonville, borough
  - Cooperstown, borough
  - Seneca, CDP
- Warren County
  - Clarendon, borough
  - Sheffield, CDP
  - Sugar Grove, borough
  - Youngsville, borough
- Washington County
  - Burgettstown, borough
  - Claysville, borough
  - West Middletown, borough
  - Wolfdale, CDP
- Wayne County
  - Bethany, borough
- Westmoreland County
  - Adamsburg, borough
  - Arona, borough
  - Derry, borough
  - Donegal, borough
  - Export, borough
  - Fellsburg, CDP
  - Harrison City, CDP
  - Herminie, CDP
  - Hostetter, CDP
  - Laurel Mountain, borough
  - Ligonier, borough
  - Millwood, CDP
  - Seward, borough
  - Youngstown, borough
- Wyoming County
  - Nicholson, borough
- York County
  - Dillsburg, borough
  - East Prospect, borough
  - Emigsville, CDP
  - Franklintown, borough
  - Glen Rock, borough
  - Hallam, borough
  - Jacobus, borough
  - Loganville, borough
  - New Salem, borough
  - Stewartstown, borough
  - Valley View, CDP
  - Wellsville, borough
  - Windsor, borough
  - Winterstown, borough
  - Yorkana, borough

== Pennsylvania exclaves that are not enclaves ==
To be a true exclave, all potential paths of travel from the exclave to the main region must cross over the territory of a different region or regions having the equivalent governmental administrative level.

- Two municipalities of Berks County have exclaves.
  - Lower Alsace Township has a southern portion that is disconnected from the main portion of the township by Reading and Mount Penn.
  - Cumru Township has two exclaves, one that is an enclave of Reading and one that is surrounded by Reading and West Reading.
- Birmingham Township and Chester County have an exclave along a bend in the Brandywine Creek that borders the state of Delaware to the south and is surrounded by Chadds Ford Township and Delaware County on three sides.
- Three municipalities in Delaware County have exclaves.
  - Springfield Township has an exclave separated from the main body of the township by the village of Swarthmore.
  - Darby Township consists of two non-contiguous areas.
  - Part of Upper Darby is separated from the main body of the township by Aldan and Lansdowne.
- Three municipalities in Lehigh County have exclaves.
  - Salisbury Township has a smaller western portion that is separated from the larger eastern portion by Allentown and Emmaus.
  - Upper Milford Township has a small exclave that is separated from the rest of the township by Emmaus.
  - Upper Saucon Township has a small exclave that is surrounded by Coopersburg and Springfield Township, Bucks County.
- In Allegheny County, O'Hara Township consists of five non-contiguous areas, with Sharpsburg, Aspinwall and Fox Chapel separating them.
- In Lackawanna County, South Abington Township has an isolated section along Glenburn Road surrounded by Clarks Summit borough, Clarks Green borough, and Waverly Township. The township also has several virtual exclaves as it is oddly shaped and surrounds Clarks Summit, Clarks Green, and Waverly Township collectively on three sides.

In Lancaster County, East Lampeter Township, Lancaster Township, and Manheim Township all have several small exclaves within Lancaster City.

- In Somerset County, Middlecreek Township has an exclave surrounded by Seven Springs and Jefferson Township.

== Pennsylvania pene-enclaves/exclaves ==
Like enclaves and exclaves, pene-enclaves and pene-exclaves are regions that are not contiguous with the main land region and have land access only through another region or regions having the equivalent governmental administrative level. Unlike enclaves and exclaves, they are not entirely surrounded by outside territory. Hence, they are enclaves or exclaves for practical purposes, without meeting the strict definition.

- In Lehigh County, the westernmost section of the city of Allentown is a pene-en(ex)clave connected at a quadripoint with South Whitehall Township, which surrounds it.
- In Cambria County, Portage consists of two sections that are connected at a single point (a quadripoint).

== See also ==
- Enclaves and exclaves
- List of enclaves and exclaves
- List of places in Pennsylvania
- List of cities in Pennsylvania
- List of towns and boroughs in Pennsylvania
- List of census-designated places in Pennsylvania
- List of townships in Pennsylvania
- List of counties in Pennsylvania
