= East Branch Raven Creek =

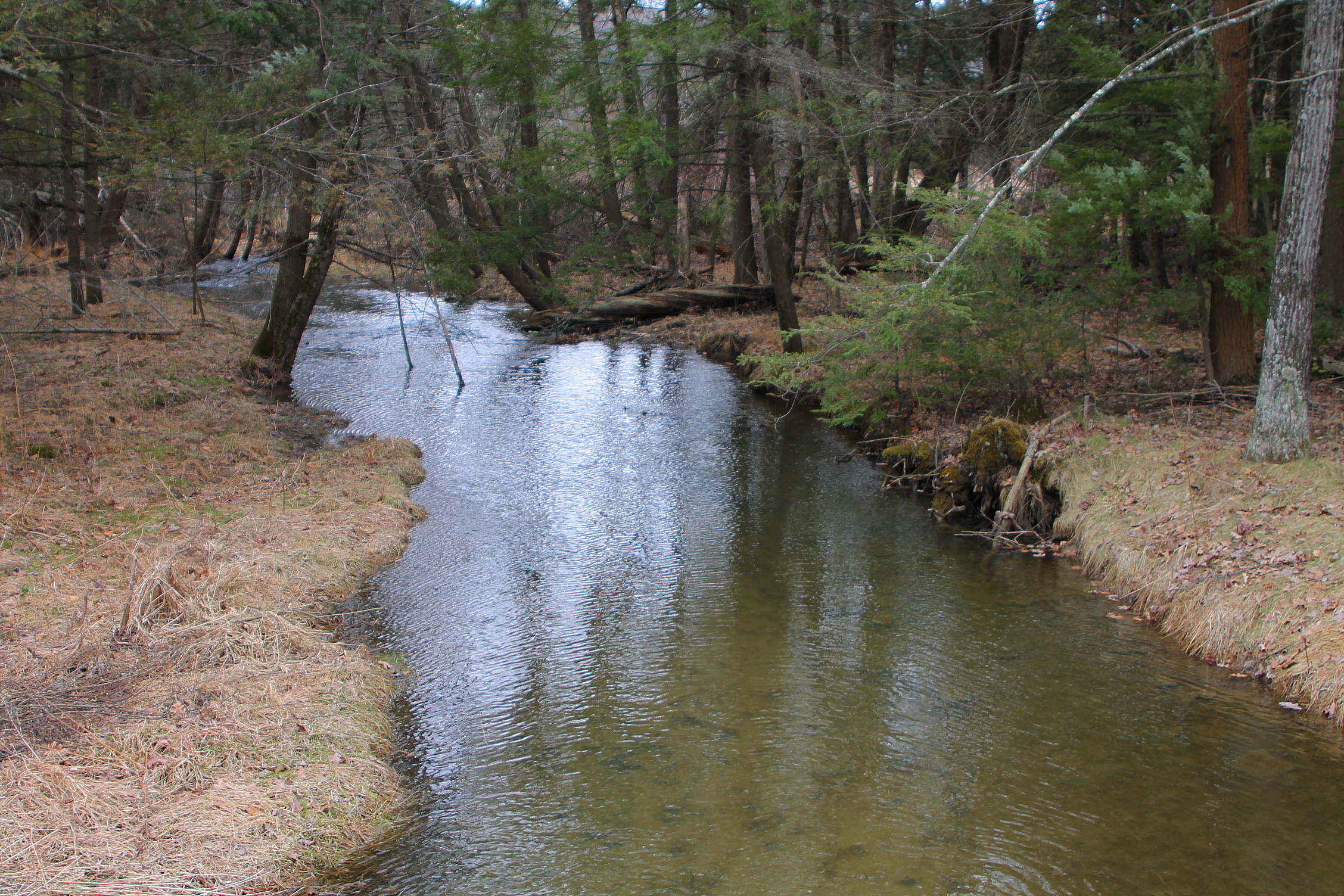
- East Branch Raven Creek looking downstream

Physical characteristics
- Source
  - location: hill in east-central Benton Township, Columbia County, Pennsylvania
  - elevation: between 1,160 and 1,180 feet (350 and 360 m)
- Mouth
  - location: Raven Creek in south-central Benton Township, Columbia County, Pennsylvania
  - coordinates: 41°10′41″N 76°21′06″W
  - elevation: 774 ft (236 m)
- Length: 3.7 mi (6.0 km)
- Basin size: 3.86 mi^{2} (10.0 km^{2})

Basin features
- Progression: Raven Creek → Fishing Creek → Susquehanna River → Chesapeake Bay
- Tributaries
  - right: one unnamed tributary, Stine Hollow

East Branch Raven Creek is a tributary of Raven Creek in Columbia County and Luzerne County, in Pennsylvania, in the United States. It is approximately 3.7 miles (6.0 km) and flows through Benton Township in Columbia County and Fairmount Township in Luzerne County. The watershed of the creek has an area of 3.86 square miles (10.0 km^{2}). It has one named tributary, which is known as Stine Hollow. East Branch Raven Creek is a freestone stream that is inhabited by brook trout. At least one bridge crosses it. The creek is named after Raven Creek.

== Course ==
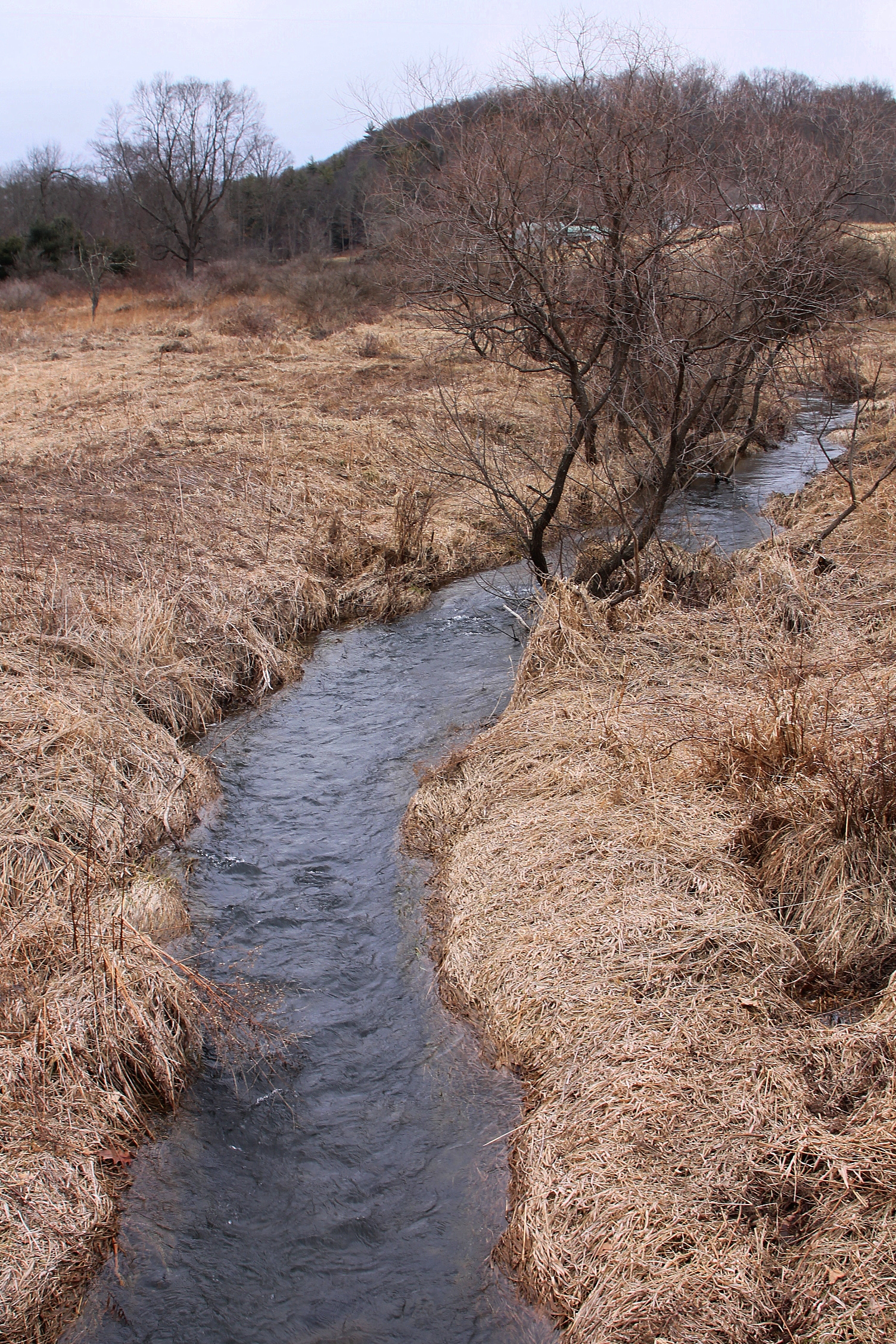
East Branch Raven Creek looking upstream

East Branch Raven Creek begins on a hill in Benton Township, Columbia County, a few hundred feet west of the border between Columbia County and Luzerne County. It flows south for a short distance before turning southeast for a few tenths of a mile. It briefly crosses into Fairmount Township, Luzerne County and passes through a small pond before returning to Benton Township. The creek then turns south-southwest for approximately a mile, passing by Hess Hill. It then crosses Pennsylvania Route 239 and continues flowing south-southwest. After several tenths of a mile, it turns southwest. Some distance further downstream, it receives its first named tributary, Stine Hollow, on its right. The creek turns south-southwest for several hundred feet before turning west for a similar distance. It then turns southwest, flowing along the base of Creveling Hill. After a short distance, the creek reaches its confluence with Raven Creek.

East Branch Raven Creek joins Raven Creek 3.19 miles (5.13 km) upstream of its mouth.

=== Tributaries ===
East Branch Raven Creek has one named tributary and one unnamed tributary. The named tributary is known as Stine Hollow. Stine Hollow joins East Branch Raven Creek 0.74 miles (1.19 km) upstream of its mouth. The stream's watershed has an area of 0.37 square miles (0.96 km^{2}).

== Hydrology, geography and geology ==
The average daily discharge of East Branch Raven Creek is estimated to be 3.63 cubic feet per second.

The elevation near the mouth of East Branch Raven Creek is 774 feet (236 m) above sea level. The elevation of the creek's source is between 1,160 and 1,180 feet (350 and 360 m) above sea level.

The percentage of runs, riffles, and pools have been measured on a section of East Branch Raven Creek that is 535 feet (163 m) long. A total of 47 percent of the section consists of pools. 28 percent of the section consists of riffles and 25 percent consists of runs.

East Branch Raven Creek is a freestone stream. It is near the edge of a glaciated plateau.

== Watershed ==
The watershed of East Branch Raven Creek has an area of 3.86 square miles (10.0 km^{2}). The entire length of the creek is in the United States Geological Survey quadrangle of Stillwater. The creek's mouth is in south-central Benton Township and its source is in east-central Benton Township. The creek is near the borough of Stillwater.

East Branch Raven Creek is in the ridge and valley physiographical province.

== History and etymology ==
East Branch Raven Creek was entered into the Geographic Names Information System on August 2, 1979. Its identifier in the Geographic Names Information System is 1173764. An electrofishing survey was carried out on the creek on May 25, 1995.

A concrete culvert bridge was constructed over East Branch Raven Creek 2.5 miles (4.0 km) east of Benton in 2006. It is 25.9 feet (7.9 m) long and carries Pennsylvania Route 239.

East Branch Raven Creek is named after Raven Creek, which it is a tributary of. Raven Creek may itself have been known as Raving Creek at one time. It is also possible that Raven Creek is named after John Sutton, who was nicknamed "Raven".

== Biology ==
East Branch Raven Creek is stocked with brook trout. The trout also naturally reproduce in the creek.

== See also ==
- List of tributaries of Fishing Creek (North Branch Susquehanna River)
- List of rivers of Pennsylvania
