= Raven Creek =

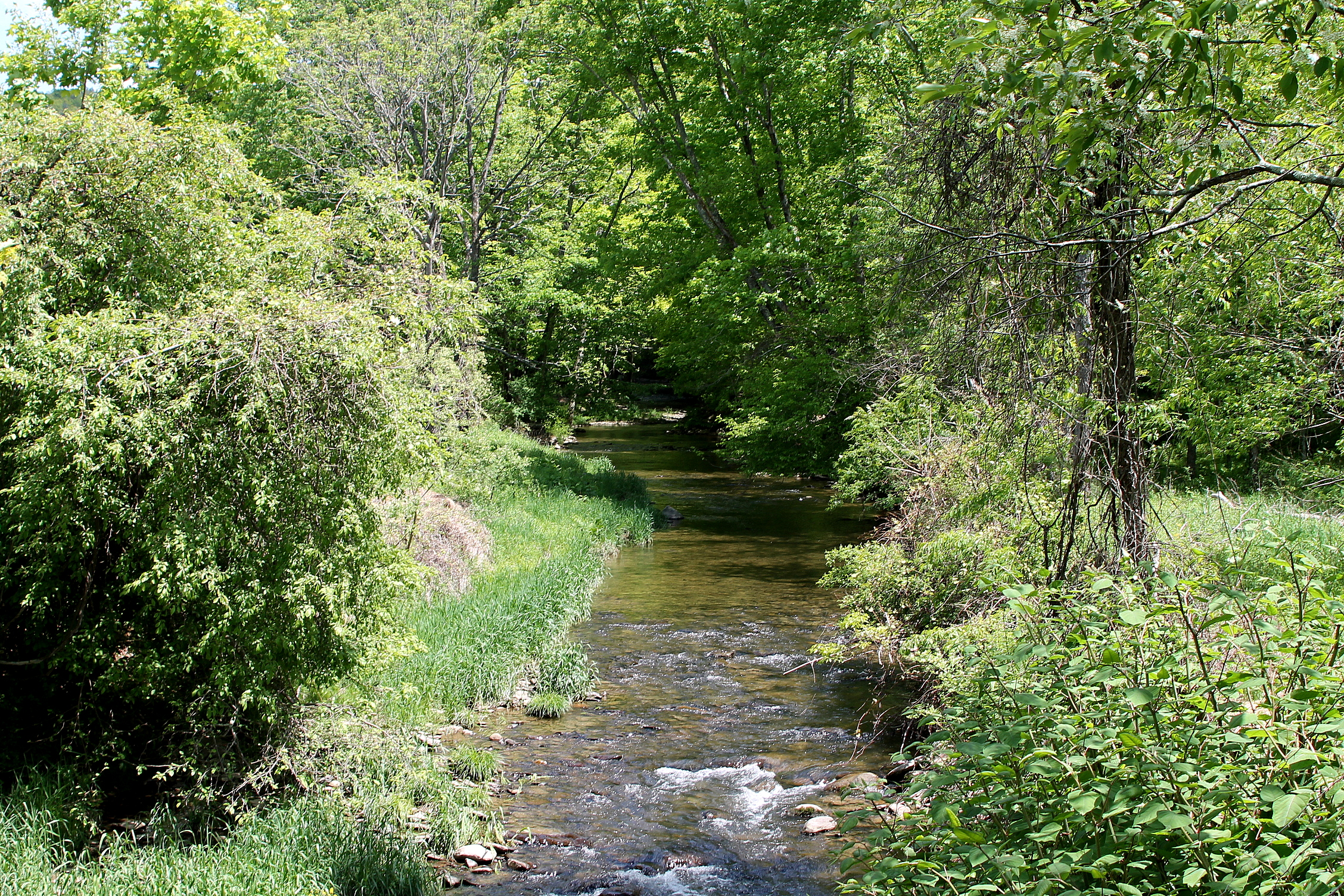
- Raven Creek in its lower reaches
- Etymology: corruption of Raving Creek

Physical characteristics
- Source
  - location: Saint Gabriel Hill in southern Sugarloaf Township, Columbia County, Pennsylvania
  - elevation: 1,240 to 1,260 feet (380 to 380 m)
- Mouth
  - location: Fishing Creek in Fishing Creek Township, Columbia County, Pennsylvania
  - coordinates: 41°09′05″N 76°21′38″W
  - elevation: 686 ft (209 m)
- Length: 8.1 mi (13.0 km)
- Basin size: 11.90 mi^{2} (30.8 km^{2})

Basin features
- Progression: Fishing Creek → Susquehanna River → Chesapeake Bay
- Tributaries
  - left: East Branch Raven Creek

Raven Creek is a tributary of Fishing Creek in Columbia County, Pennsylvania, in the United States. It is approximately 8.1 miles (13.0 km) long and flows through Sugarloaf Township, Benton Township, and Fishing Creek Township. The watershed of the creek has an area of 11.90 square miles (30.8 km^{2}). Numerous bridges, both covered and non-covered, have been built over the creek. Its main tributary is East Branch Raven Creek.

== Course ==
Raven Creek begins in southern Sugarloaf Township near the community of Five Points on Saint Gabriel Hill. It flows south-southwest, reaching Benton Township within a mile. In Benton Township, the creek flows into a valley between Saint Gabriel Hill and Long Hill. Further downstream, it turns south for a few miles, crossing Pennsylvania Route 239. In the southern part of the township, it receives the tributary East Branch Raven Creek and turns southwest, exiting Benton Township. Upon exiting Benton Township, the creek enters Fishing Creek Township and shortly afterwards Stillwater. In Stillwater, Raven Creek enters the valley of Fishing Creek and turns southeast, flowing parallel to the latter creek. Slightly more than a mile downstream, it reaches its confluence with Fishing Creek.

Raven Creek joins Fishing Creek 18.62 miles (29.97 km) upstream of its mouth.

=== Tributaries ===
East Branch Raven Creek is the main tributary of Raven Creek. It is 2.9 miles (4.7 km) long.

== Geography and geology, and watershed ==
The elevation near the mouth of Raven Creek is 686 feet (209 m) above sea level. The elevation of the creek's source ranges from 1,240 to 1,260 feet (380 to 380 m).

The watershed of Raven Creek has an area of 11.90 square miles (30.8 km^{2}).

Two covered bridges historically crossed Raven Creek: the Joe Ash Covered Bridge and the McHenry's Mill or Paperdale Covered Bridge. The former was destroyed in 1963 or 1964 and the latter was destroyed in 1958. The Joe Ash Covered Bridge was 27 feet (8.2 m) long.

Additionally, a number of other bridges have been built across Raven Creek. A concrete tee beam bridge was built across the creek in 1928. Another bridge was built across it in 1950 and three more were built between 1958 and 1963. A prestressed box beam bridge was built in 1968. A steel culvert bridge and a concrete culvert bridge were built across the creek in 1974 and 1976, respectively and another bridge was built in 2011.

Raven Creek is described as "quite a stream" in John Gosse Freeze's 1888 book A History of Columbia County, Pennsylvania: From the Earliest Times.

== History and etymology ==
Raven Creek may have been historically known as Raving Creek due to the way it appeared during floods. The name later became Ravin' Creek before becoming Raven Creek.

On July 30, 1864, a group of several army veterans (including a Lieutenant Robinson) and two civilians named Isiah Harrison and Eli Buckalew rode on horseback from Fairmount Springs, in Luzerne County, into Columbia County to search for deserters. During this search, the searchers, who were later dubbed the "Lincoln Midnight Riders", rode parallel to Raven Creek for some time. Lieutenant Robinson was shot later in the search, triggering claims of an alleged military uprising called the Fishing Creek Confederacy.

A member of the Patterson family constructed a gristmill at the mouth of Raven Creek in Stillwater in 1865. After some time, it was converted into a paper mill and used to manufacture wrapping paper. The Impervious Paper Company of Scranton owned the mill from 1910 to 1912 and used it to make cartridge paper.

== Biology ==
East Branch Raven Creek, a tributary of Raven Creek, has brook trout reproducing in it.

== See also ==
- Bee Sellers Hollow, next tributary of Fishing Creek going downstream
- Davis Hollow, next tributary of Fishing Creek going upstream
- List of tributaries of Fishing Creek (North Branch Susquehanna River)
- List of rivers of Pennsylvania
