= Bee Sellers Hollow =

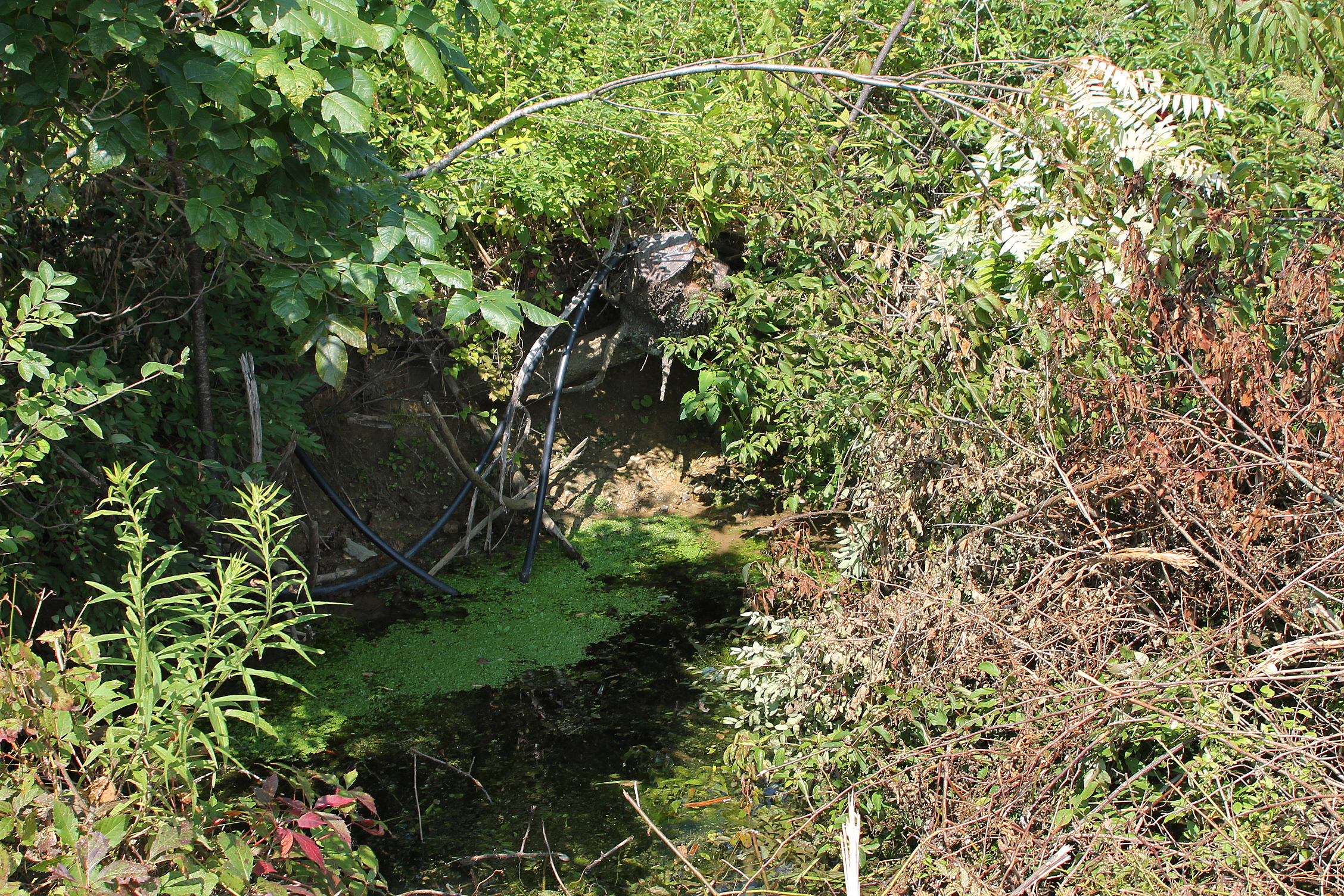
- Bee Sellers Hollow at Kline Road

Physical characteristics
- Source
  - location: valley in the western part of Stillwater, Columbia County, Pennsylvania
  - elevation: between 780 and 800 feet (240 and 240 m)
- Mouth
  - location: Fishing Creek in Stillwater, Columbia County, Pennsylvania
  - coordinates: 41°08′01″N 76°21′45″W
  - elevation: 686 ft (209 m)
- Length: 1.8 mi (2.9 km)
- Basin size: 1.58 mi^{2} (4.1 km^{2})

Basin features
- Progression: Fishing Creek → Susquehanna River → Chesapeake Bay

Bee Sellers Hollow is a tributary of Fishing Creek in Columbia County, Pennsylvania, in the United States. It is approximately 1.8 miles (2.9 km) long and flows through Stillwater. The watershed of Bee Sellers Hollow has an area of 1.58 square miles (4.1 km^{2}). The stream is not considered to be impaired. The surficial geology in the area consists mainly of bedrock, along with alluvium, colluvium, Illinoian Till, and Illinoain Lag.

== Course ==
Bee Sellers Hollow begins in a valley in the western part of Stillwater, not far from Beecellar Road. It flows east for a few tenths of a mile before turning east-southeast. Several tenths of a mile further downstream, the stream flows away from Beecellar Road and leaves its valley. It then turns south-southeast for several tenths of a mile, crossing Kline Road. After this, it turns east-southeast for a few hundred feet, crossing Pennsylvania Route 487 and reaching its confluence with Fishing Creek near the southern border of Stillwater.

Bee Sellers Hollow joins Fishing Creek 17.26 miles (27.78 km) upstream of its mouth.

== Hydrology, geography and geology ==
The elevation near the mouth of Bee Sellers Hollow is 686 feet (209 m) above sea level. The elevation of the stream's source is between 780 and 800 feet (240 and 240 m) above sea level.

In the upper and middle reaches of Bee Sellers Hollow, the surficial geology consists of colluvium and alluvium along the valley floor. Alluvium contains stratified sand, silt, and gravel, along with some boulders. Colluvium contains clasts made of shale and sandstone. There are also a few patches of Illinoian Till and one patch Illinoian Lag in the watershed. However, most of the surficial geology in the vicinity of the stream consists of bedrock consisting of sandstone and shale.

The valley of Karnes Hollow is in the watershed of Bee Sellers Hollow.

Bee Sellers Hollow is not considered to be impaired.

== Watershed ==
The watershed of Bee Sellers Hollow has an area of 1.58 square miles (4.1 km^{2}). The mouth of the stream's valley is in the United States Geological Survey quadrangle of Stillwater. However, its source is in the quadrangle of Benton.

Bee Sellers Hollow is mainly located in the western part of the borough of Stillwater. The stream is entirely within that borough.

== History and etymology ==
The valley of Bee Sellers Hollow was entered into the Geographic Names Information System on August 2, 1979. Its identifier in the Geographic Names Information System is 1169089.

Bee Sellers Hollow is an unofficially named stream that is named after the valley through which it flows. In the early 20th century, John McHenry kept bees in the area, selling their honey to locals. He kept the bees in a concrete-floor cave known as the Bee Cellar and Bee Sellers Hollow came to be named after this.

== See also ==
- Raven Creek, next tributary of Fishing Creek going upstream
- List of tributaries of Fishing Creek (North Branch Susquehanna River)
- List of rivers of Pennsylvania
