= Jamison City, Pennsylvania =

Unincorporated community in Pennsylvania, US

- Census-designated place
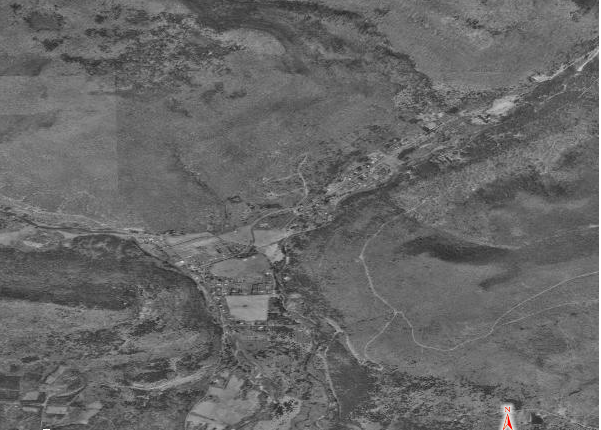
- Jamison City from the air

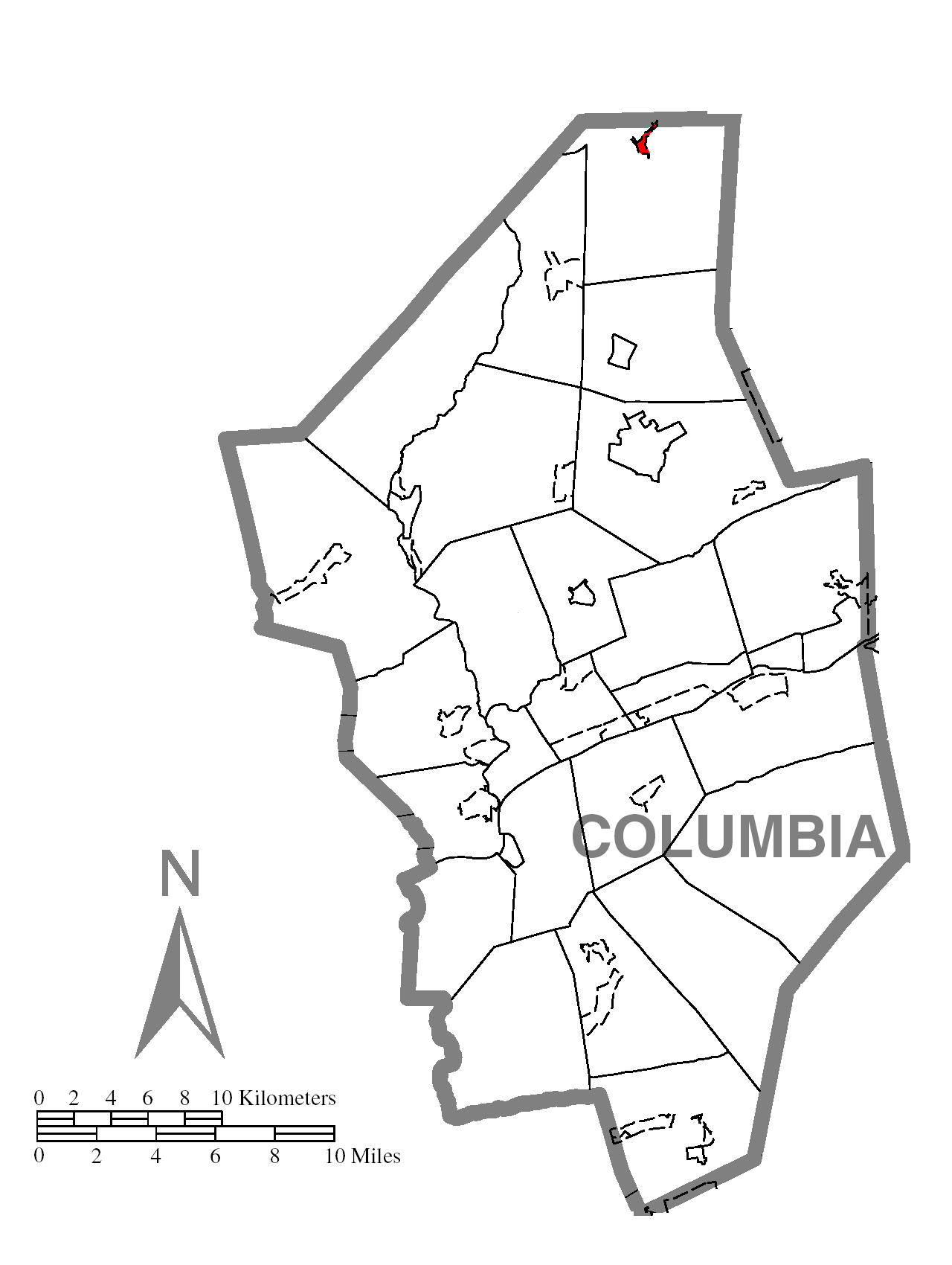
- Location within Columbia County

- Location within the U.S. state of Pennsylvania Jamison; City (the United States)
- Coordinates: 41°18′5″N 76°21′59″W
- Country: United States
- State: Pennsylvania
- County: Columbia
- Township: Sugarloaf

Area
  - Total: 0.39 sq mi (1.01 km^{2})
  - Land: 0.39 sq mi (1.01 km^{2})
  - Water: 0 sq mi (0.00 km^{2})
- Elevation: 1,070 ft (330 m)

Population (2020)
  - Total: 111
  - Density: 285.9/sq mi (110.38/km^{2})
- Time zone: UTC-5 (Eastern (EST))
  - Summer (DST): UTC-4 (EDT)
- ZIP Code: 17814
- FIPS code: 42-37728
- GNIS feature ID: 1177983

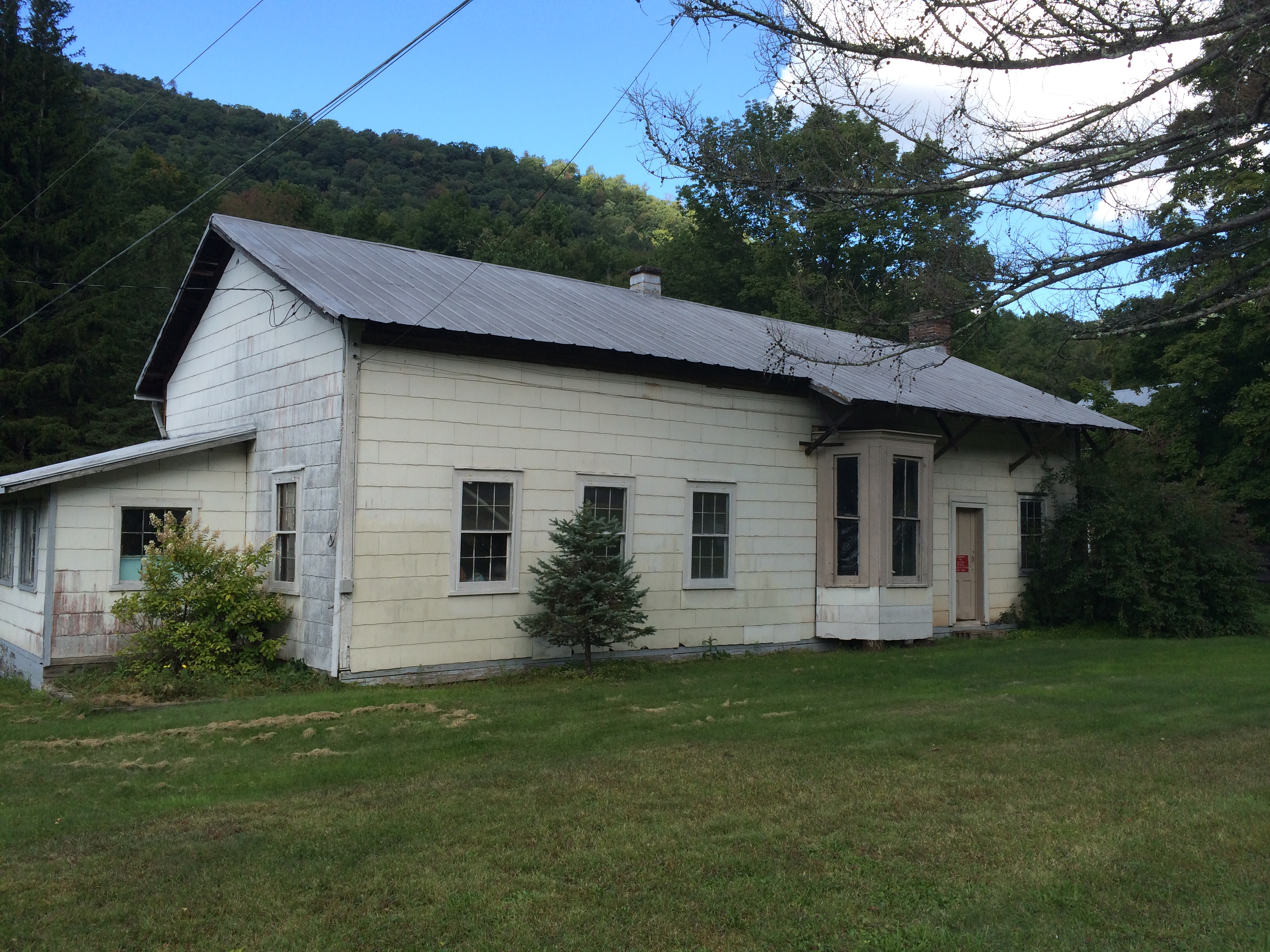
Jamison City station on the Bloomsburg and Sullivan Railroad. Building is one of the few remaining stations that is in the original location and is still standing. The station is still standing as of 2023. A monument in the front yard commemorating the 100th year Centennial of Jamison City Area in 1989 (dedicated to E. William (Bill) and Pauline Mather who owned the station grounds until 2012) and the Mather General Store building to the right of the train station that his father ran when Jamison City was in its heyday circa 1889.

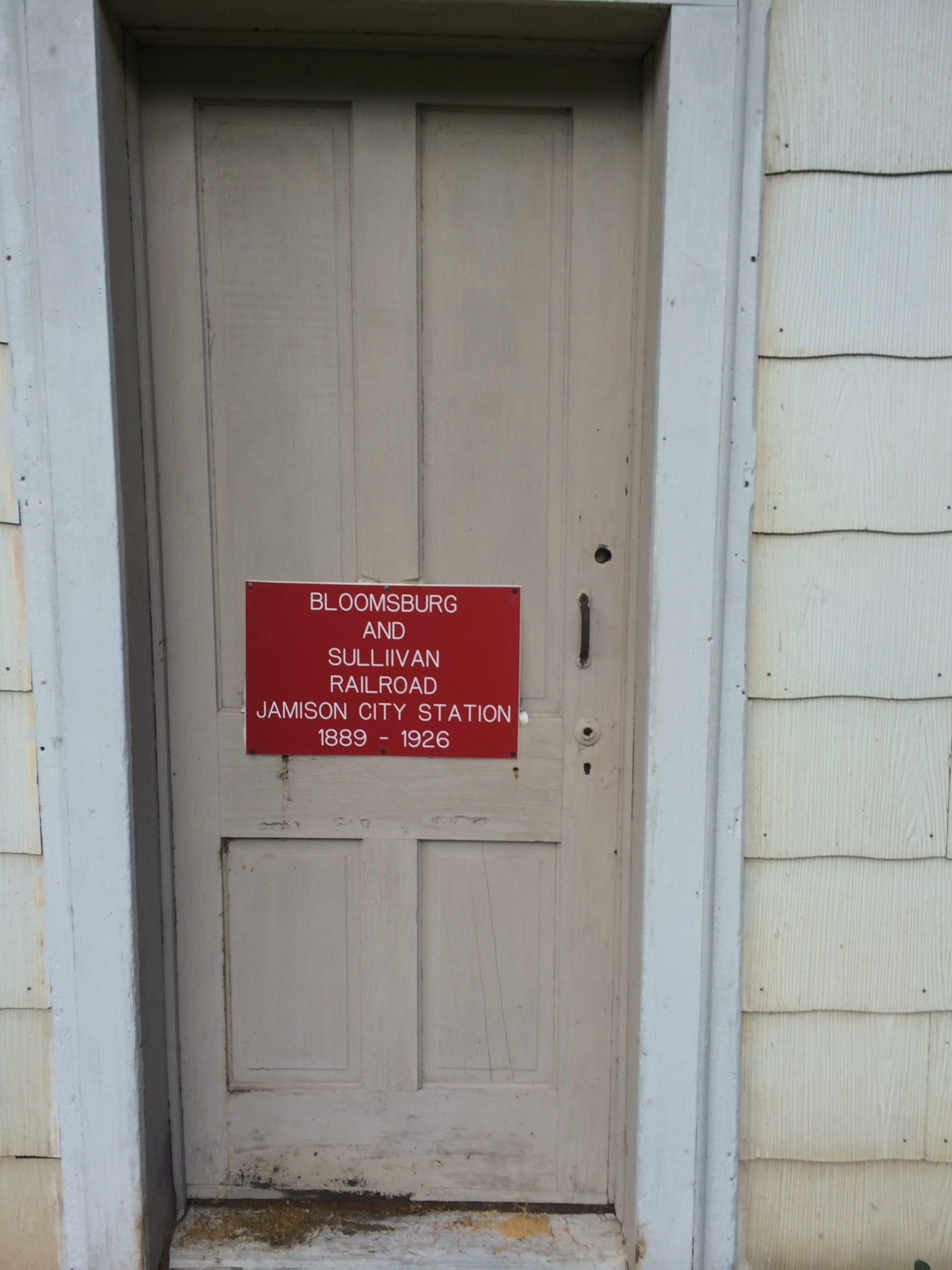
Historical Marker on the door of the Jamison City station on the Bloomsburg and Sullivan railroad. Historical marker was placed for the Jamison City Centennial celebration that occurred in July 1989.

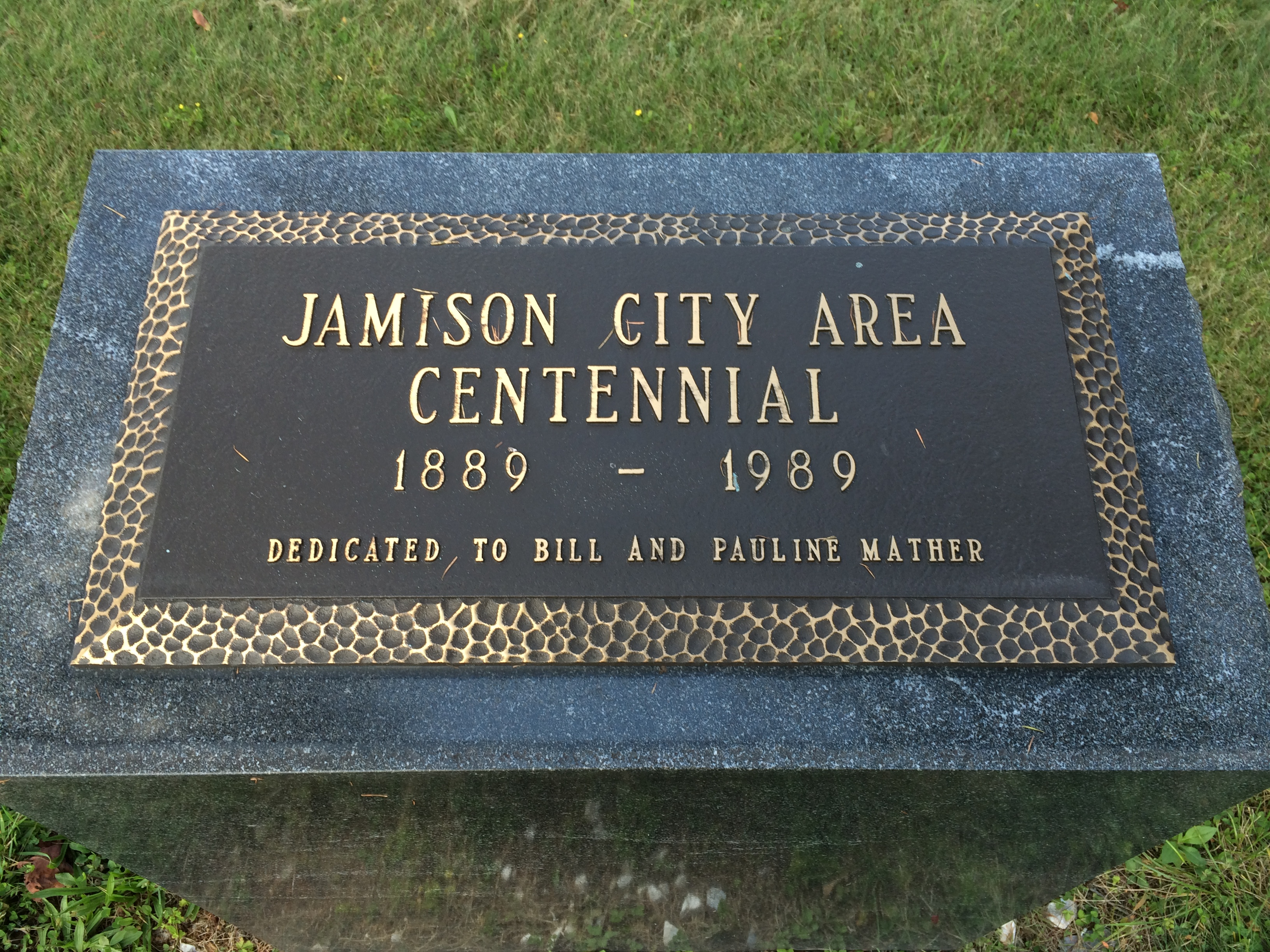
Jamison City Bloomsburg and Sullivan railroad station Centennial marker on the grounds of the Jamison City train station on the Bloomsburg and Sullivan railroad commemorating the Jamison City Area Centennial celebration that occurred in July 1989. Marker was dedicated to Bill and Pauline Mather who owned the land of the train station until 2012.

Jamison City is a census-designated place in Sugarloaf Township, Columbia County, Pennsylvania, United States. It is part of Northeastern Pennsylvania. The population was 111 at the 2020 census. It is part of the Bloomsburg-Berwick micropolitan area.

== Geography ==
Jamison City is located at 41°18′5″N 76°21′59″W (41.301523, -76.366443), in the northern reaches of Columbia County. It is in northern Sugarloaf Township and is bordered on the north by Davidson Township in Sullivan County. According to the United States Census Bureau, the CDP has a total area of 0.4 square miles (1.0 km^{2}), all land.

The CDP is situated on mostly level terrain, and surrounded on the north, east, and west by mountains. The East Branch of Fishing Creek runs through Jamison City.

== History ==
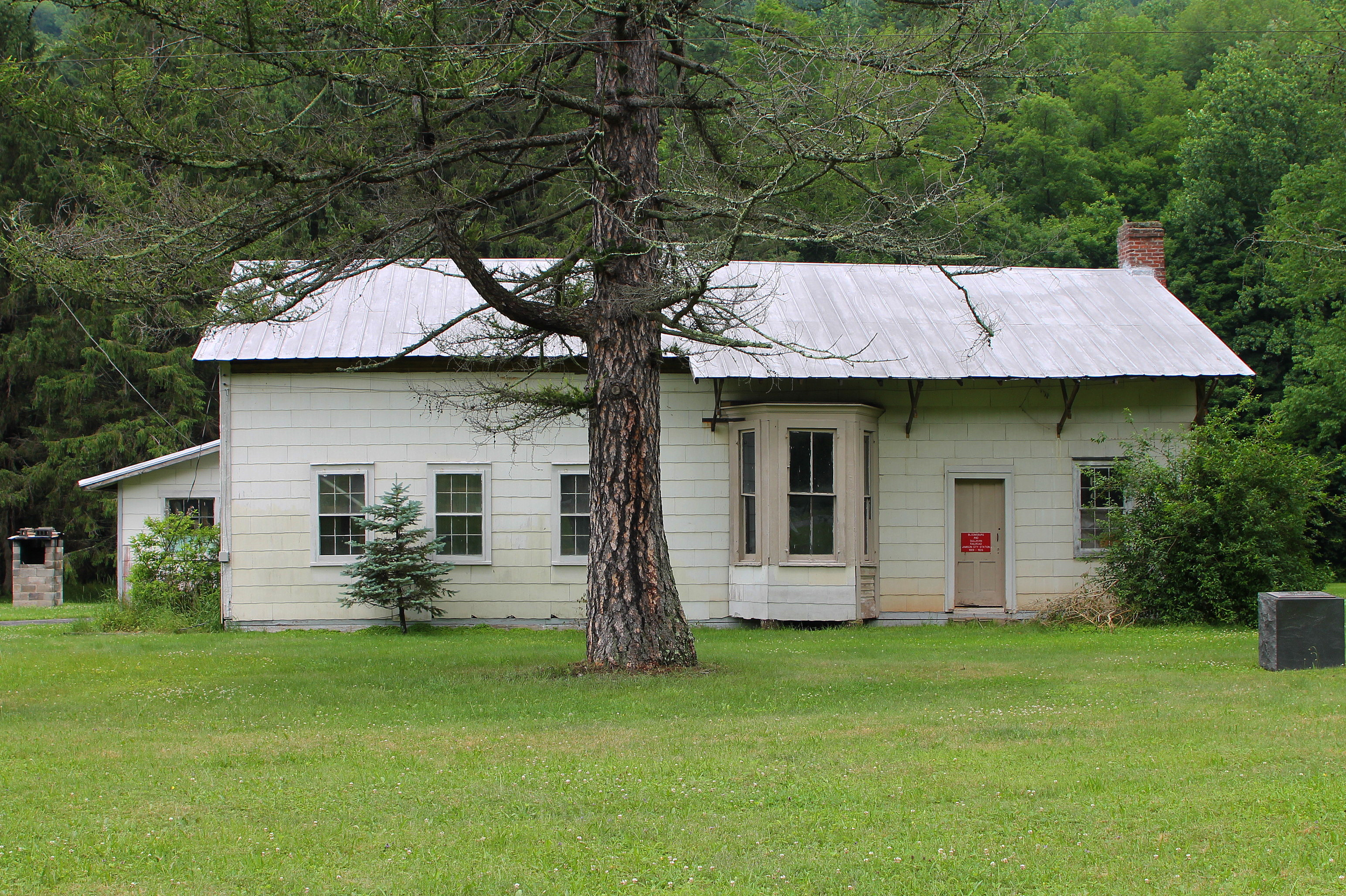
Station on the defunct Bloomsburg and Sullivan Railroad at its northern terminus in Jamison City

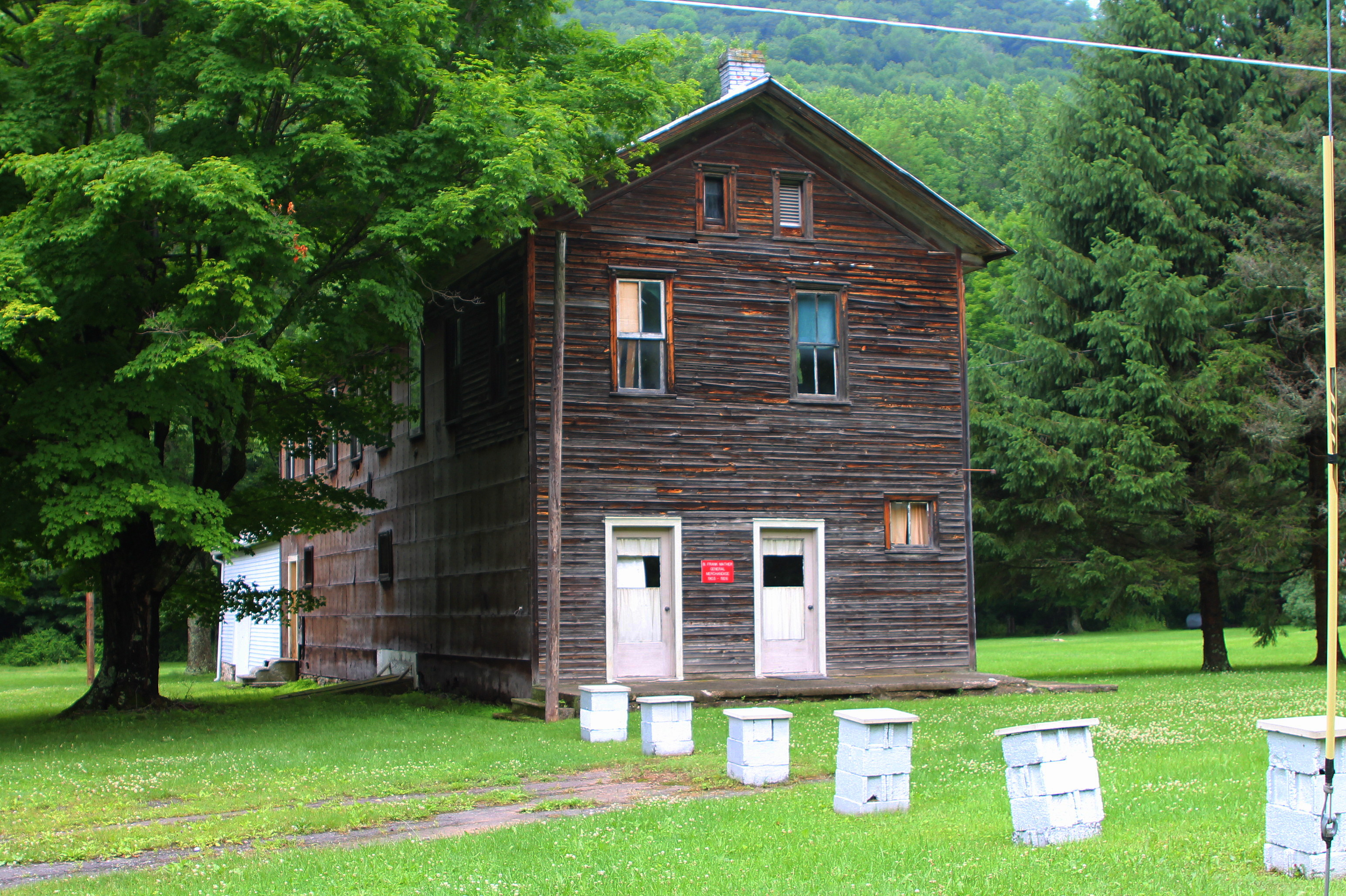
B. Frank Mather General Merchandise, a store that operated in Jamison City from 1903 to 1926.

Jamison City was formed at the northern terminus of the Bloomsburg and Sullivan Railroad. In 1889 a sawmill was built in Jamison City. However, it stopped producing wood in 1912, and the final load of lumber from it was shipped to Bloomsburg in 1914. A tannery was built in Jamison City, but it was closed in 1925.

== Demographics ==
Historical population
Census	Pop.	Note	%±
2020	111		—
U.S. Decennial Census

As of the census of 2000, there were 102 people, 46 households, and 28 families residing in the CDP. The population density was 417.1 inhabitants per square mile (161.0/km^{2}). There were 96 housing units at an average density of 392.6 per square mile (151.6/km^{2}). The racial makeup of the CDP was 100.00% White.

There were 46 households, out of which 23.9% had children under the age of 18 living with them, 50.0% were married couples living together, 6.5% had a female householder with no husband present, and 39.1% were non-families. 30.4% of all households were made up of individuals, and 21.7% had someone living alone who was 65 years of age or older. The average household size was 2.22 and the average family size was 2.79.

In the CDP, the population was spread out, with 19.6% under the age of 18, 7.8% from 18 to 24, 34.3% from 25 to 44, 12.7% from 45 to 64, and 25.5% who were 65 years of age or older. The median age was 40 years. For every 100 females, there were 100.0 males. For every 100 females age 18 and over, there were 110.3 males.

The median income for a household in the CDP was $36,250, and the median income for a family was $36,250. Males had a median income of $35,000 versus $20,156 for females. The per capita income for the CDP was $17,873. There were 6.3% of families and 4.2% of the population living below the poverty line, including 12.0% of under eighteens and none of those over 64.

== Education ==
The school district is Benton Area School District. The district's schools are L.R. Appleman Elementary School and Benton Middle-Senior High School.
