= Stillwater Covered Bridge No. 134 =

- U.S. National Register of Historic Places
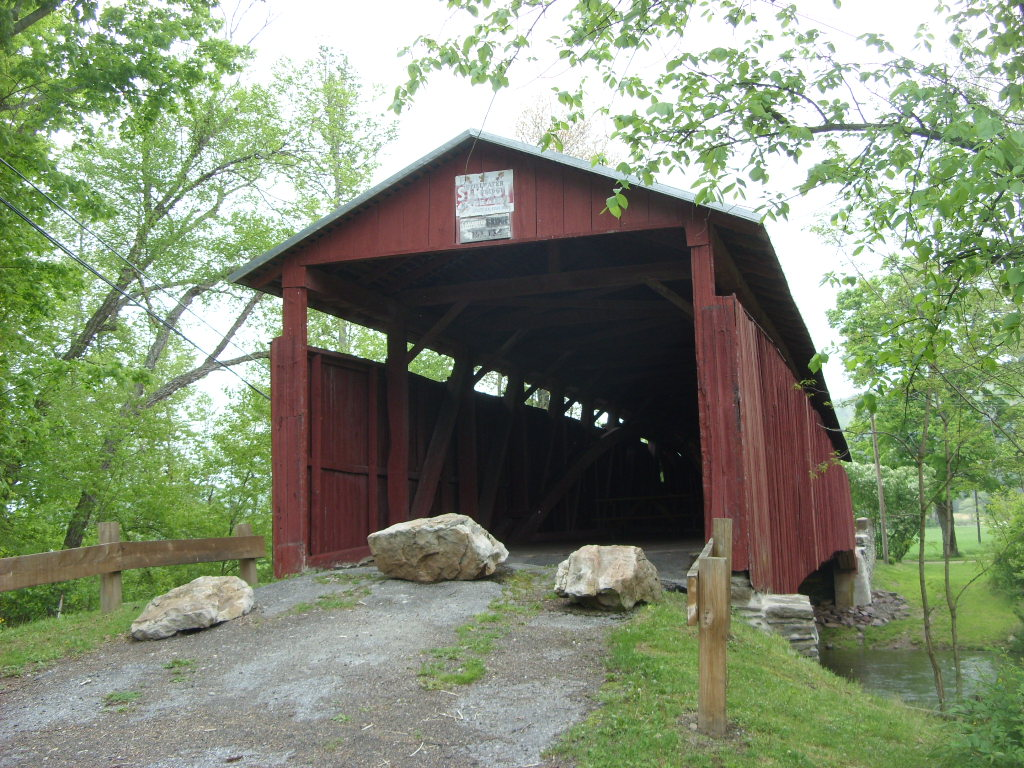
- Stillwater Covered Bridge, May 2009

- Location within Pennsylvania Location within the United States
- Location: Pennsylvania Route 629, Stillwater, Pennsylvania
- Coordinates: 41°9′7″N 76°21′39″W
- Area: 0.1 acres (0.040 ha)
- Built: 1849
- Built by: James McHenry, John Edson
- Architectural style: Burr Truss Arch
- MPS: Covered Bridges of Columbia and Montour Counties TR
- NRHP reference No.: 79003177
- Added to NRHP: November 29, 1979

The Stillwater Covered Bridge No. 134 is a historic wooden covered bridge located at Stillwater in Columbia County, Pennsylvania. It is a 151-foot-long (46 m), Burr Truss arch bridge with a galvanized steel roof constructed in 1849. It crosses the Big Fishing Creek. It is one of 28 historic covered bridges in Columbia and Montour Counties.

It was listed on the National Register of Historic Places in 1979.

== Gallery ==
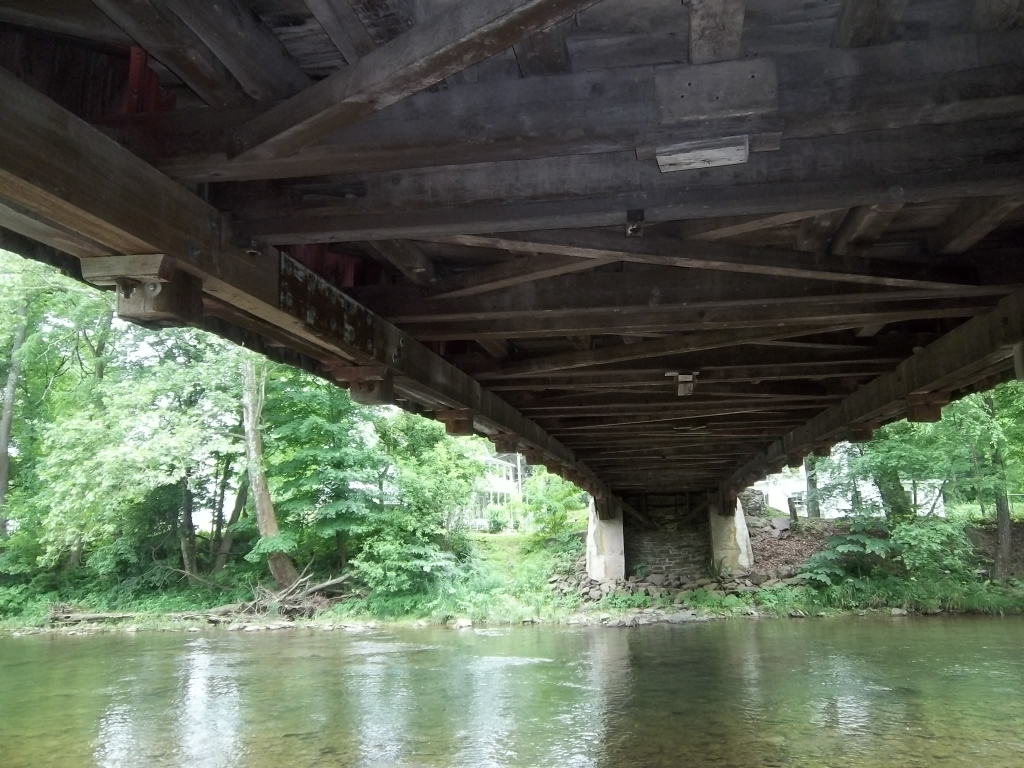
Stillwater Covered Bridge No. 134 as seen from below

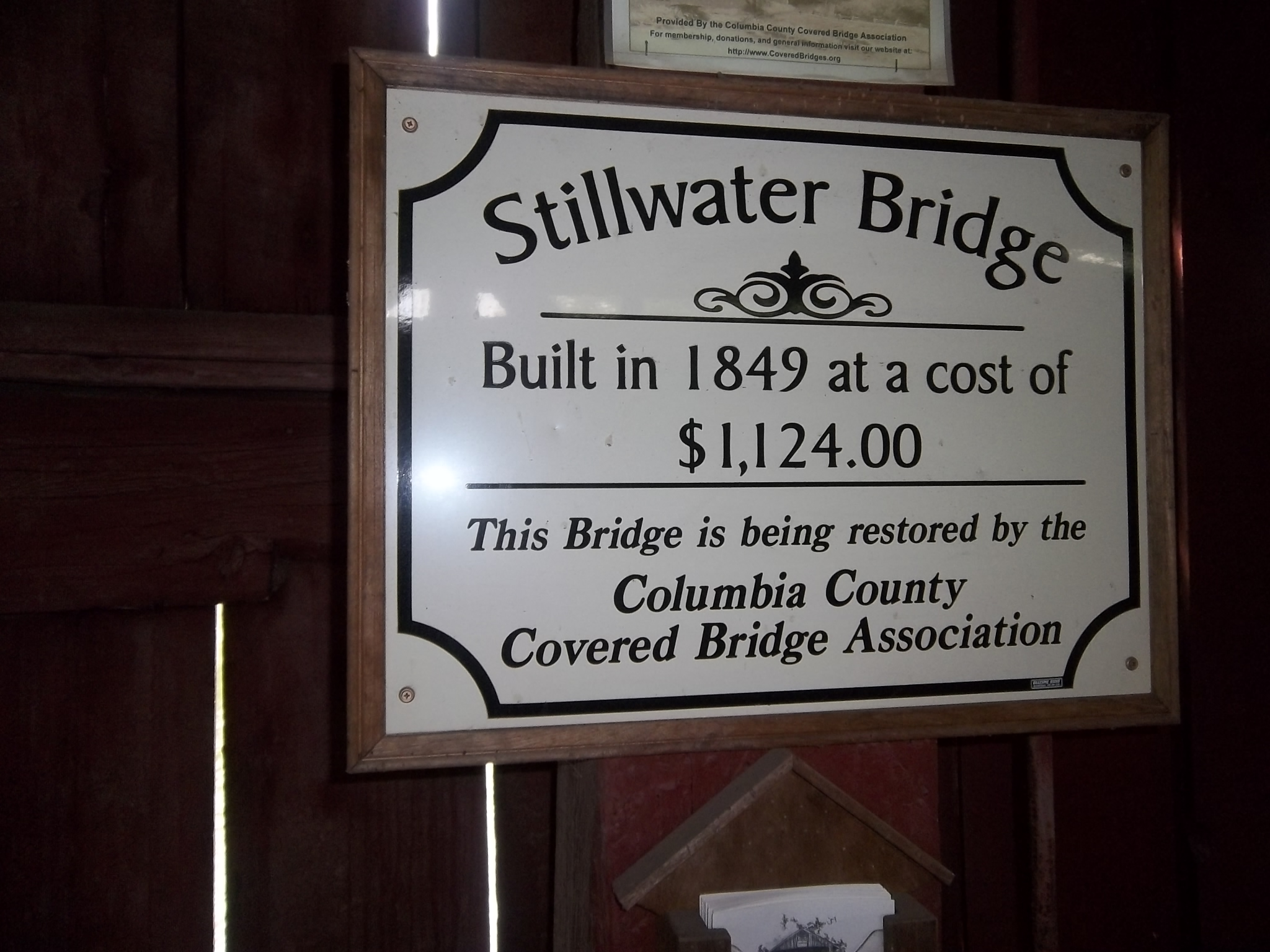
Stillwater Covered Bridge No. 134 information plaque

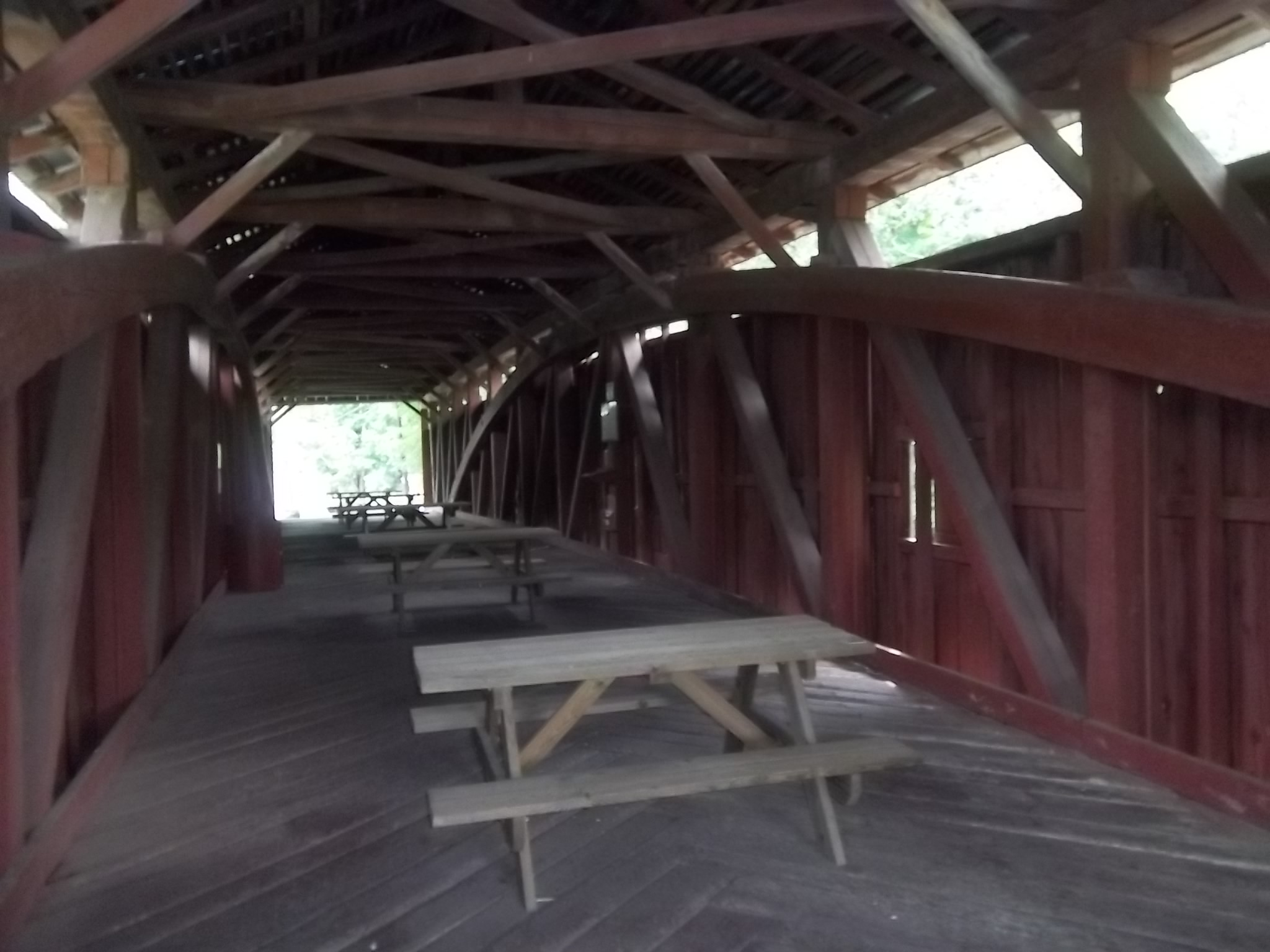
Interior of Stillwater Covered Bridge No. 134

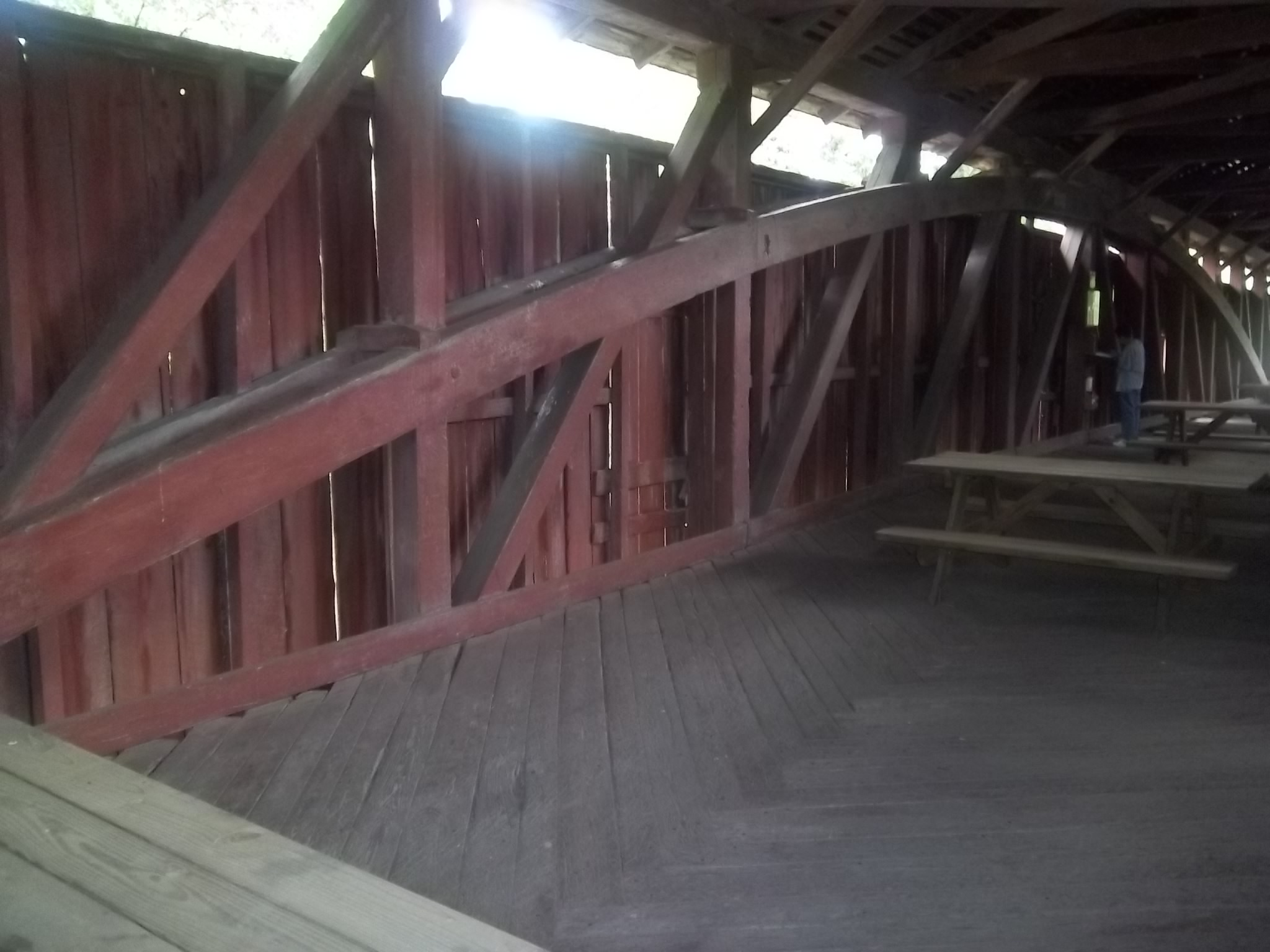
Detail of arch of Stillwater Covered Bridge No. 134

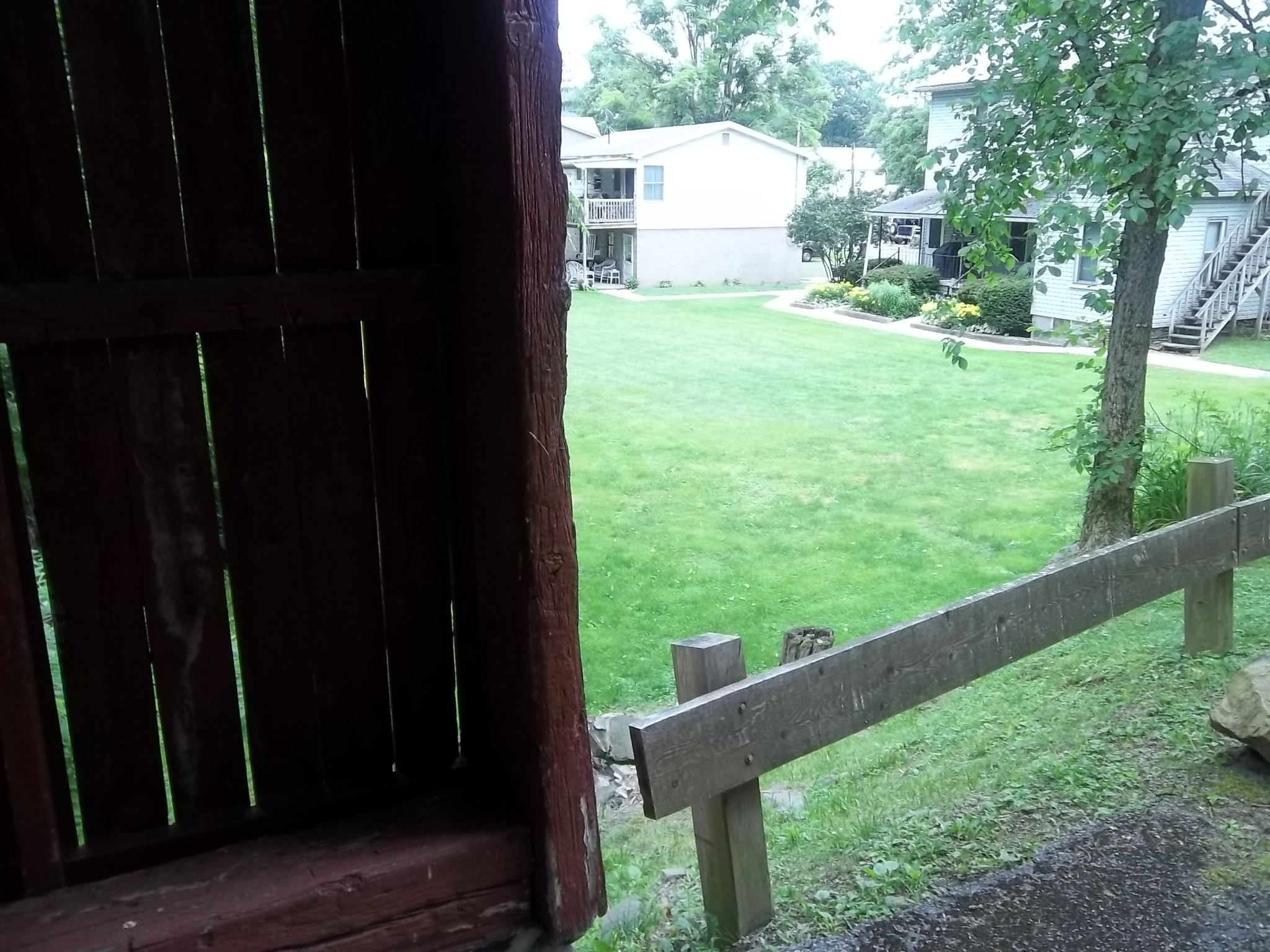
Stillwater Covered Bridge No. 134 proximity to homes

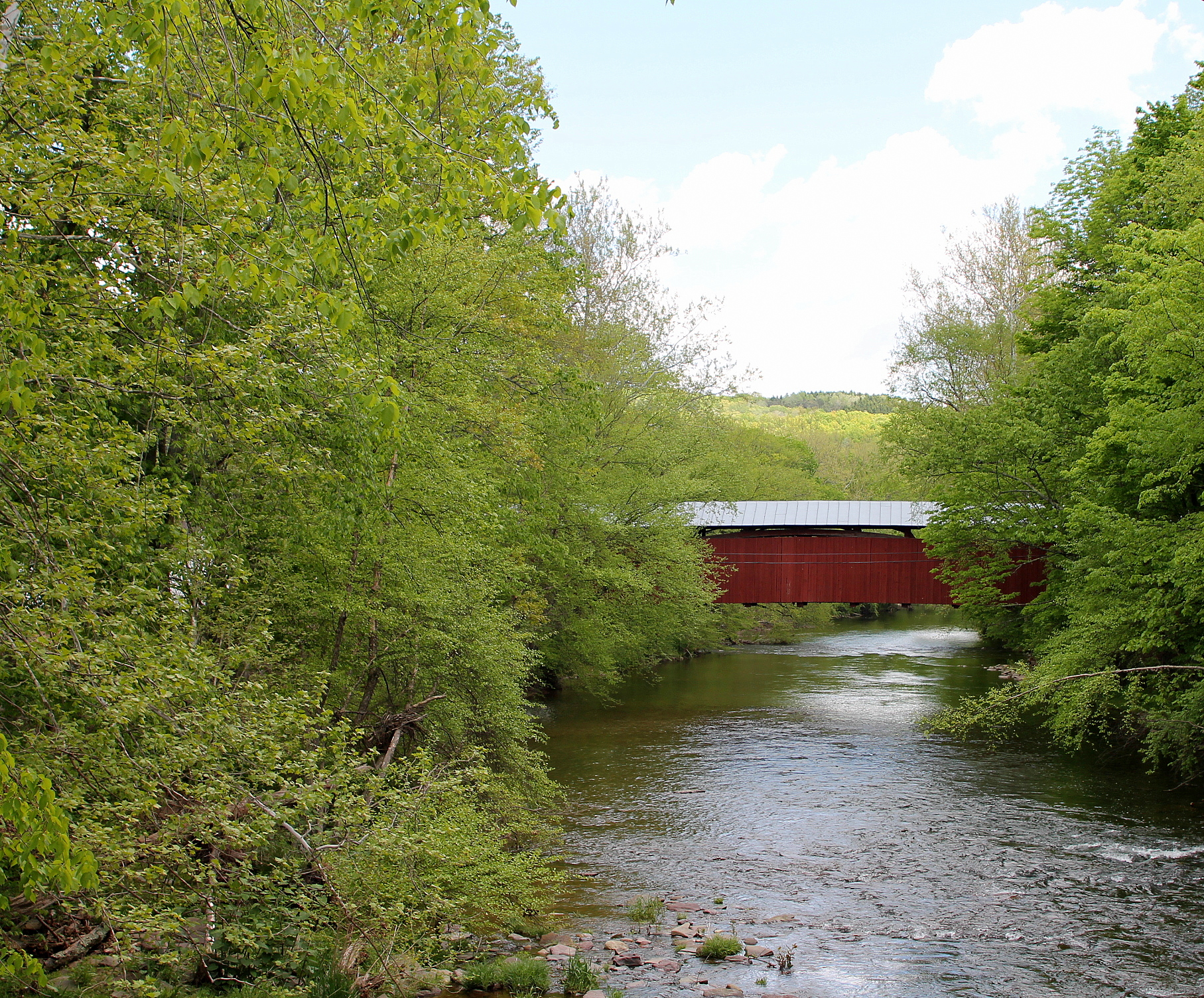
Fishing Creek with the Stillwater Covered Bridge in the background
