= List of places in Pennsylvania =

This list of current cities, boroughs, townships, unincorporated communities, counties, and other recognized places in the U.S. state of Pennsylvania also includes information on the number and names of counties in which the place lies, and its lower and upper zip code bounds, if applicable.

== See also ==
- List of counties in Pennsylvania
- List of census-designated places in Pennsylvania
- List of cities in Pennsylvania
- List of towns and boroughs in Pennsylvania
- List of townships in Pennsylvania
- List of enclaves in Pennsylvania
