= Jonestown, Pennsylvania =

Jonestown, Pennsylvania may refer to:

- Jonestown, Columbia County, Pennsylvania, a census-designated place
- Jonestown, Lebanon County, Pennsylvania, a borough
- Jonestown, Schuylkill County, Pennsylvania
- Jonestown, Washington County, Pennsylvania
