= Benton Middle-Senior High School =

Benton Middle Senior High School

Location
- 400 Park Street; Benton, Columbia County, Pennsylvania 17814; United States; 41.1978183026847°N 76.38052272195894°W

Information
- Type: Public
- School district: Benton Area School District
- Grades: 7th - 12th
- Enrollment: 179 (2018)[12]
- Language: English
- Color: Orange
- Team name: Tigers
- Feeder schools: L.R. Appleman Elementary School (K-6th)
- Website: https://www.bentonsd.k12.pa.us/page/high-school

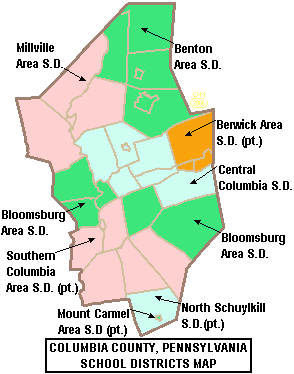
School District region in Columbia County

Benton Middle Senior High School is a tiny, rural, public combined middle school and high school in Benton, Pennsylvania. As of 2018, BAHS had 179 students enrolled.

Benton Middle Senior High School serves the Boroughs of Benton and Stillwater and Benton Township, Fishing Creek Township, Jackson Township and Sugarloaf Township in Columbia County, Pennsylvania. The school is the sole middle school and high school operated by the Benton Area School District.

== Extracurriculars ==
The Benton Middle Senior High School offers a wide variety of clubs, activities and a sports program.

=== Sports ===
According to PIAA directory July 2012, the district funds:

Boys

- Baseball - A
- Basketball- A
- Golf - AA
- Soccer - A
- Wrestling - AA

Girls

- Basketball - A
- Field hockey - AA
- Golf - AA
- Soccer (fall) - A
- Softball - A

Middle school sports

Boys

- Basketball
- Soccer
- Wrestling

Girls

- Basketball
- Field hockey
