= Benton Area School District =

School district in Pennsylvania

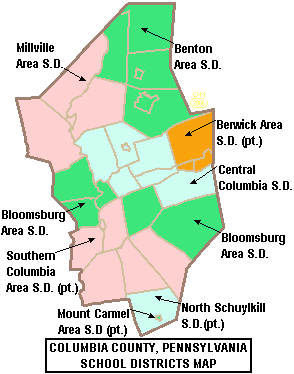

Address
- 600 Green Acres Road Benton, Columbia County, Pennsylvania, 17814; United States

District information
- Type: Public

Other information
- Website: https://www.bentonsd.k12.pa.us/

The Benton Area School District is a small, rural public school district in Columbia County, Pennsylvania. Benton Area School District serves the boroughs of Benton and Stillwater and Benton Township, Fishing Creek Township, Jackson Township and Sugarloaf Township. The District encompasses approximately 97 square miles (250 km^{2}). According to 2000 federal census data, it served a resident population of 5,260. By 2010, the District's population declined to 5,231 people. It is one of eight public school districts operating in Columbia County and is one of the 500 public school districts of Pennsylvania in 2016.

According to the Pennsylvania Budget and Policy Center, 30.6% of the District's pupils lived at 185% or below the Federal Poverty level as shown by their eligibility for the federal free or reduced price school meal programs in 2012. The per capita income of residents was $16,915 in 2009, while the median family income was $40,669. In the Commonwealth of Pennsylvania, the median family income was $49,501 and the United States median family income was $49,445, in 2010. The educational attainment levels for the Benton Area School District population (25 years old and over) were 85.6% high school graduates and 15.9% college graduates. It encompasses 96.8 square miles (251 km^{2}).

The Benton Area School District operates two schools: Benton Middle-Senior High School (7th–12th grades) and L.R. Appleman Elementary School (K–6th). Benton Area High School students may choose to attend Columbia-Montour Area Vocational-Technical School for training in the vocational trades. The Central Susquehanna Intermediate Unit 16 (CSIU16) provides the district with a wide variety of services like specialized education for disabled students and hearing, speech and visual disability services and professional development for staff and faculty.

== Extracurriculars ==
The district offers a variety of activities, clubs and after school sports programs. Varsity and junior varsity athletic activities are under the Pennsylvania Interscholastic Athletic Association and the regional Pennsylvania Heartland Athletic Conference.

=== Sports ===
The District funds:

Boys

- Baseball - A
- Basketball- A
- Golf - AA
- Soccer - A
- Wrestling - AA

Girls

- Basketball - A
- Field Hockey - A
- Golf - AA
- Soccer (Fall) - A
- Softball - A

Middle School Sports

Boys

- Basketball
- Soccer
- Wrestling

Girls

- Basketball
- Field Hockey
- Soccer

According to PIAA directory July 2016
