= Benton, Pennsylvania =

Borough in Pennsylvania, US

- Borough
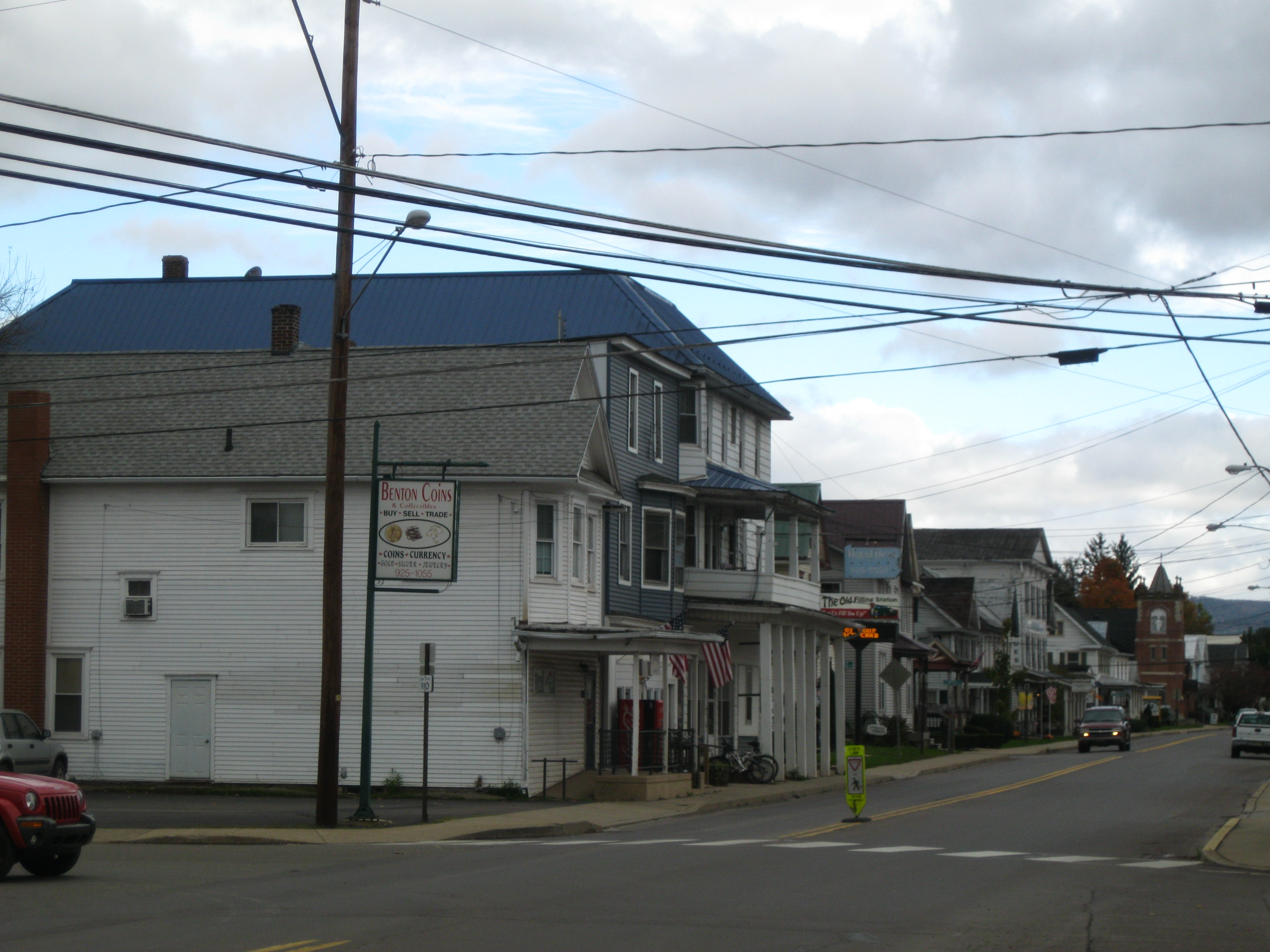
- View north on PA 487 in Benton in October 2012

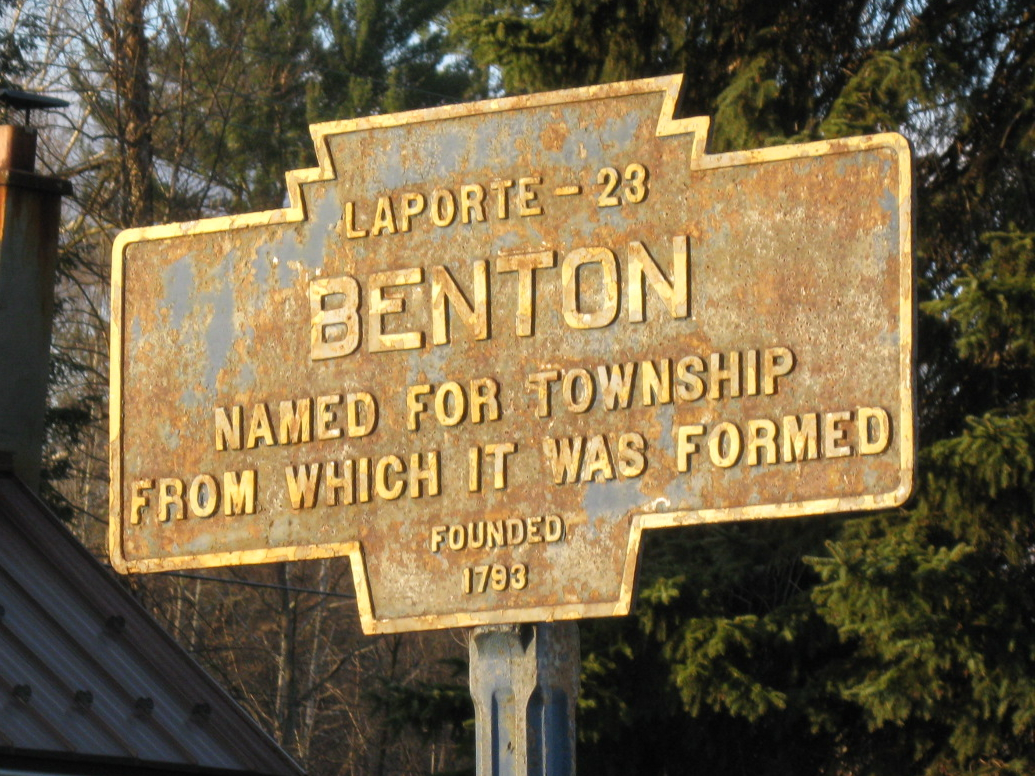
- Keystone Marker

- Location of Benton in Columbia County, Pennsylvania (left) and of Columbia County in Pennsylvania (right)

- Map showing Columbia County in Pennsylvania

- Location of Benton in Pennsylvania Benton (the United States)
- Coordinates: 41°11′46″N 76°23′00″W
- Country: United States
- State: Pennsylvania
- County: Columbia
- Settled: 1833
- Incorporated: 1894

Government
  - Type: Borough Council
  - Mayor: George Remphrey

Area
  - Total: 0.61 sq mi (1.59 km^{2})
  - Land: 0.60 sq mi (1.55 km^{2})
  - Water: 0.019 sq mi (0.05 km^{2})
- Elevation: 765 ft (233 m)

Population (2020)
  - Total: 823
  - Density: 1,378.7/sq mi (532.32/km^{2})
- Time zone: UTC-5 (Eastern (EST))
  - Summer (DST): UTC-4 (EDT)
- ZIP Code: 17814
- Area code: 570
- FIPS code: 42-05680
- GNIS feature ID: 1215122

Benton is a borough in Columbia County, Pennsylvania, United States. It is part of Northeastern Pennsylvania. The population was 824 at the 2020 census. It is part of the Bloomsburg-Berwick micropolitan area.

== Geography ==
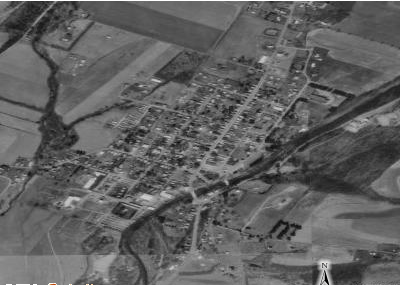
Aerial view of Benton

Benton is located in northern Columbia County at 41°11′46″N 76°23′0″W (41.196144, -76.383354). It is surrounded by Benton Township, a separate municipality. According to the United States Census Bureau, the borough has a total area of 0.61 square miles (1.59 km^{2}), of which 0.60 square miles (1.55 km^{2}) is land and 0.02 square miles (0.05 km^{2}), or 2.96%, is water. Fishing Creek, a south-flowing tributary of the Susquehanna River, runs through the eastern part of Benton.

== History ==
The Benton area was first settled by two families in 1792. A schoolhouse was opened in 1799. Starting around 1860, tanning and lumber industries began to grow north of the borough. By 1868, Benton had about fifty houses. In the year of 1910, Benton was destroyed by a fire. Two teenagers lit firecrackers in a hay barn, which caught fire and caused over sixty buildings to burn, as the town did not yet have a water system. As a result, the Benton Dam was built in 1915. However, this was not the end of Benton's disasters. Another fire struck just one year later destroying more houses. Again in 1962, a fire ripped through the town, destroying the distillery and its warehouse containing over 17,000 bottles of whiskey. In 2011, Benton was also devastated by a flood. And on April 15, 2019, an EF2 tornado touched down in Benton, damaging nine trailers and up to 50 homes and businesses. Despite its various adversities and disasters, Benton continues to thrive.

== Transportation ==
State highways. Two highways concurrently serve as Benton's Main Street:

- Pennsylvania Route 239 leads east 14 miles (23 km) to US 11 at Shickshinny on the Susquehanna River and northwest 13 miles (21 km) to PA 42 at North Mountain.
- Pennsylvania Route 487 leads north 13 miles (21 km) to Ricketts Glen State Park and south 17 miles (27 km) to Bloomsburg, the Columbia County seat.

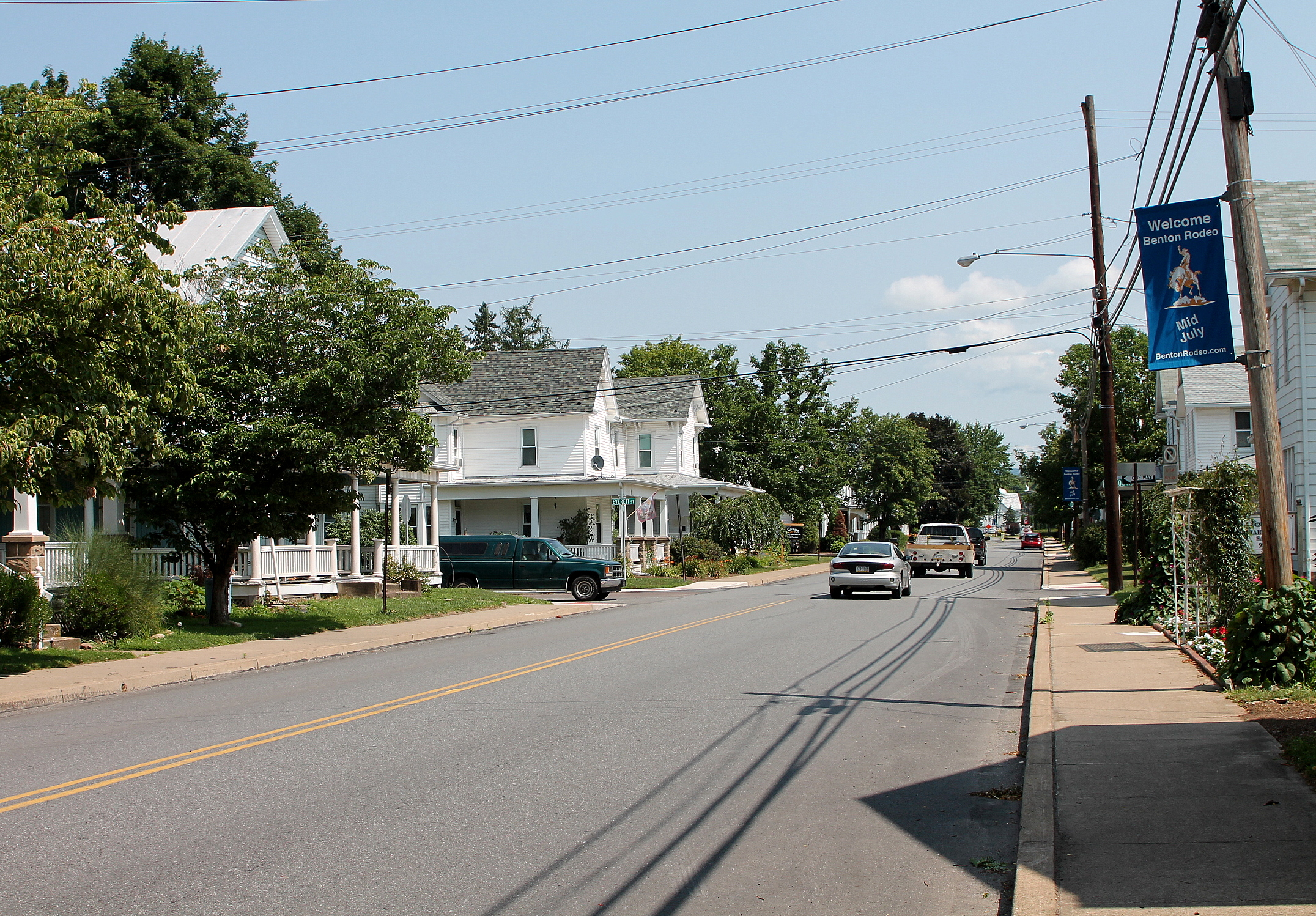
Main Street (Pennsylvania Routes 239/487) in Benton, looking north

Interstate highway: Benton is 14 miles north of Interstate 80.

Air: Although Williamsport Regional Airport (IATA: IPT) is the closest airport with scheduled airline service, travelers often seek out the lower fares at Trenton–Mercer Airport (IATA: TTN) or Philadelphia International Airport (IATA: PHL).

Rail: From 1888 to 1972, Benton was served by the Bloomsburg and Sullivan Railroad, which was later the Reading Railroad's Bloomsburg branch.

== Demographics ==
Historical population
Census	Pop.	Note	%±
1880	191		—
1900	635		—
1910	719		13.2%
1920	696		−3.2%
1930	733		5.3%
1940	786		7.2%
1950	890		13.2%
1960	981		10.2%
1970	1,027		4.7%
1980	981		−4.5%
1990	958		−2.3%
2000	955		−0.3%
2010	824		−13.7%
2020	823		−0.1%
2021 (est.)	824	▲	0.1%

As of the census of 2000, there were 955 people, 394 households, and 265 families residing in the borough. The population density was 1,503.6 inhabitants per square mile (580.5/km^{2}). There were 436 housing units at an average density of 686.5 per square mile (265.1/km^{2}). The racial makeup of the borough was 99.69% White, 0.10% African American, and 0.21% from two or more races. Hispanic or Latino of any race were 0.10% of the population.

There were 394 households, out of which 33.2% had children under the age of 18 living with them, 48.5% were married couples living together, 12.9% had a female householder with no husband present, and 32.7% were non-families. 28.4% of all households were made up of individuals, and 10.4% had someone living alone who was 65 years of age or older. The average household size was 2.42 and the average family size was 2.95.

In the borough the population was spread out, with 25.9% under the age of 18, 10.3% from 18 to 24, 26.3% from 25 to 44, 22.3% from 45 to 64, and 15.3% who were 65 years of age or older. The median age was 36 years. For every 100 females, there were 91.4 males. For every 100 females age 18 and over, there were 84.9 males.

The median income for a household in the borough was $27,986, and the median income for a family was $32,125. Males had a median income of $28,015 versus $20,625 for females. The per capita income for the borough was $12,831. About 15.2% of families and 19.2% of the population were below the poverty line, including 29.0% of those under age 18 and 8.8% of those age 65 or over.

== Education ==
Benton is part of the Benton Area School District,. which contains two schools: L.R. Appleman Elementary School (K-6), and Benton Middle-Senior High School (7-12). There are 24 colleges within 50 miles of Benton Borough . The nearest college with over 2000 students is the Bloomsburg University of Pennsylvania at a distance of 13.4 miles. The top rated college near Benton is Bucknell University.
