= Stillwater, Pennsylvania =

Borough in Pennsylvania, US

- Borough
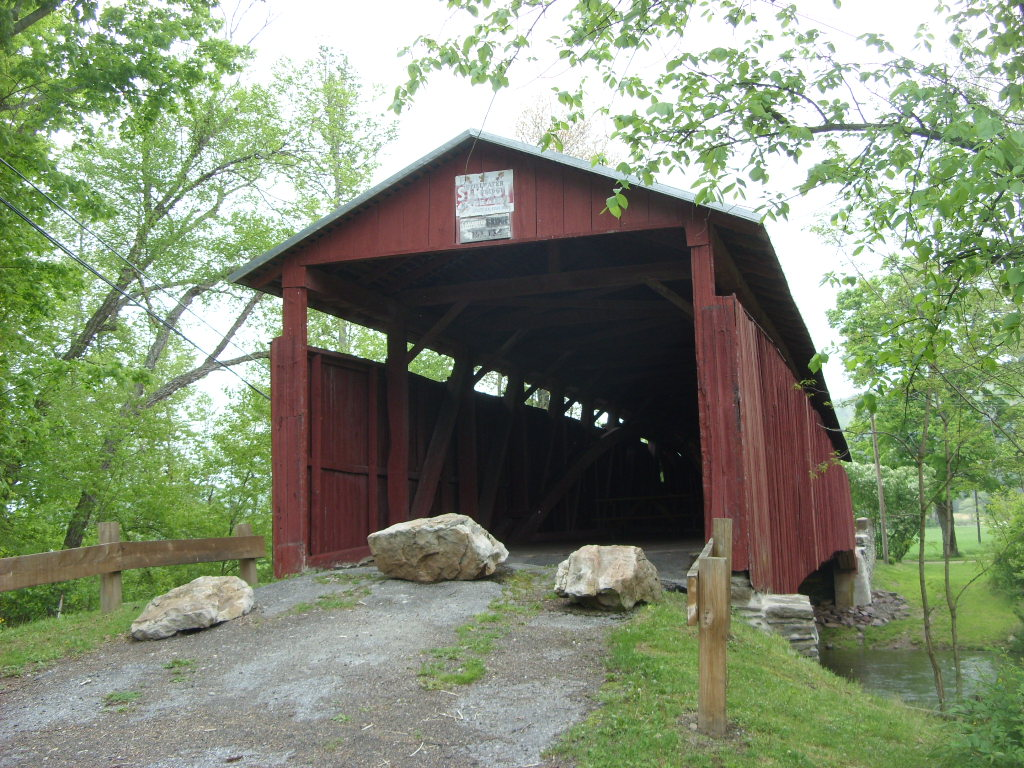
- Stillwater Covered Bridge No. 134 crosses Fishing Creek in Stillwater

- Location of Stillwater in Columbia County, Pennsylvania.

- Location in Pennsylvania Stillwater (the United States)
- Coordinates: 41°08′56″N 76°21′58″W
- Country: United States
- State: Pennsylvania
- County: Columbia
- Settled: 1832
- Incorporated (borough): 1899

Area
  - Total: 3.15 sq mi (8.17 km^{2})
  - Land: 3.11 sq mi (8.06 km^{2})
  - Water: 0.042 sq mi (0.11 km^{2})
- Elevation: 710 ft (220 m)

Population (2020)
  - Total: 200 ▼
  - Estimate (2021): 200
  - Density: 65.8/sq mi (25.42/km^{2})
- Time zone: UTC−5 (Eastern (EST))
  - Summer (DST): UTC−4 (EDT)
- ZIP Code: 17878
- Area code: 570
- FIPS code: 42-74184

Stillwater is a borough in Columbia County, Pennsylvania, United States. It is part of Northeastern Pennsylvania. The population was 200 at the 2020 census. It is part of the Bloomsburg-Berwick micropolitan area.

== History ==
The first store in Stillwater was founded in 1847 by Daniel and James McHenry. Stillwater was officially separated from Fishing Creek Township in 1899. There were few industries in the borough in the past, and those that did exist had mainly to do with lumber. The Stillwater Covered Bridge No. 134 was listed on the National Register of Historic Places in 1979.

== Geography ==
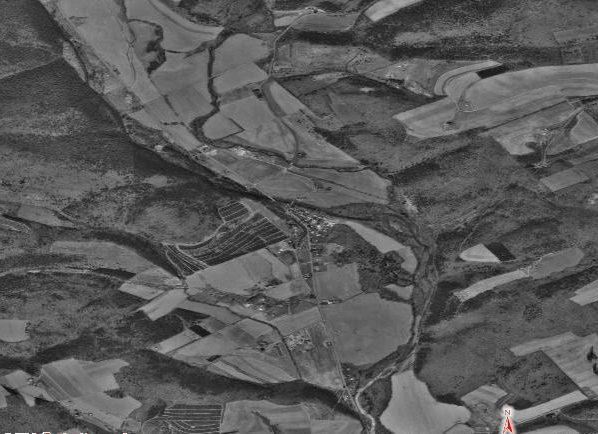
Aerial view of Stillwater

Stillwater is located in northeastern Columbia County at 41°9′1″N 76°22′0″W (41.150244, -76.366751). According to the United States Census Bureau, the borough has a total area of 3.2 square miles (8.2 km^{2}), of which 3.1 square miles (8.1 km^{2}) is land and 0.04 square miles (0.1 km^{2}), or 1.32%, is water. Stillwater is 13 miles (21 km) northeast of Bloomsburg, the county seat, via Pennsylvania Route 487, which continues north 3.5 miles (5.6 km) to Benton and beyond. Fishing Creek, a tributary of the Susquehanna River, runs southward through Stillwater. Stillwater is flat in the middle, with rolling hills in the east and west.

== Demographics ==
Historical population
Census	Pop.	Note	%±
1900	177		—
1910	179		1.1%
1920	166		−7.3%
1930	171		3.0%
1940	200		17.0%
1950	189		−5.5%
1960	193		2.1%
1970	208		7.8%
1980	201		−3.4%
1990	223		10.9%
2000	194		−13.0%
2010	209		7.7%
2020	199		−4.8%
2021 (est.)	200	▲	0.5%

As of the census of 2010, there were 209 people, 85 households, and 56 families residing in the borough. The population density was 63.1 inhabitants per square mile (24.4/km^{2}). There were 96 housing units at an average density of 31.2 units per square mile (12.0 units/km^{2}). The racial makeup of the borough was 100.00% White.

There were 85 households, out of which 23.5% had children under the age of 18 living with them, 60.0% were married couples living together, 3.5% had a female householder with no husband present, and 34.1% were non-families. Of all households, 27.1% were made up of individuals, and 14.1% had someone living alone who was 65 years of age or older. The average household size was 2.28 and the average family size was 2.82.

In the borough the population was spread out, with 17.5% under the age of 18, 8.2% from 18 to 24, 27.3% from 25 to 44, 29.4% from 45 to 64, and 17.5% who were 65 years of age or older. The median age was 43 years. For every 100 females there were 108.6 males. For every 100 females age 18 and over, there were 102.5 males.

The median income for a household in the borough was $41,250, and the median income for a family was $48,750. Males had a median income of $34,583 versus $25,893 for females. The per capita income for the borough was $19,879. None of the families and 3.3% of the population were living below the poverty line, including no under eighteens and 4.8% of those over 64.

== Education ==
The school district is Benton Area School District. The district's schools are L.R. Appleman Elementary School and Benton Middle-Senior High School.

== In popular culture ==
The main character of the CBS show NCIS, Leroy Jethro Gibbs, comes from Stillwater. The sixth-season episode "Heartland" takes place in Stillwater as Gibbs is forced to return to his hometown to solve a case, and also confront his estranged father. The real Stillwater was not filmed; as production of NCIS takes place in southern California, the filmed location was the town of Piru. Stillwater is also briefly featured in the seventh season finale, the season eight premiere, and extensively in the eleventh-season finale.
