= National Register of Historic Places listings in Montour County, Pennsylvania =

Location of Montour County in Pennsylvania

This is a list of the National Register of Historic Places listings in Montour County, Pennsylvania.

This is intended to be a complete list of the properties and districts on the National Register of Historic Places in Montour County, Pennsylvania, United States. The locations of National Register properties and districts for which the latitude and longitude coordinates are included below, may be seen in a map.

There are 7 properties and districts listed on the National Register in the county.

This National Park Service list is complete through NPS recent listings posted March 14, 2025.

== Current listings ==
	Name on the Register	Image	Date listed	Location	City or town	Description
1	Thomas Beaver Free Library and Danville YMCA	Thomas Beaver Free Library and Danville YMCA	January 15, 1987 (#86003578)	East Market and Ferry Streets; 40°57′36″N 76°36′23″W	Danville	
2	Gottlieb Brown Covered Bridge	Gottlieb Brown Covered Bridge	August 8, 1979 (#79002311)	East of Potts Grove on Township 594; 41°00′06″N 76°46′26″W	Liberty Township	Extends into East Chillisquaque Township in Northumberland County
3	Danville Historic District	Danville Historic District	August 18, 1994 (#94000828)	Roughly bounded by Bloom Street, Cedar Street, the Susquehanna River, and Chestnut Street; 40°57′42″N 76°37′02″W	Danville	
4	Danville West Market Street Historic District	Danville West Market Street Historic District	May 29, 1985 (#85001174)	Bounded by Courthouse Alley, Front Street, Haney's Alley and Mahoning Street; 40°57′46″N 76°37′29″W	Danville	
5	Keefer Covered Bridge No. 7	Keefer Covered Bridge No. 7	November 29, 1979 (#79003174)	Pennsylvania Route 346, southwest of Washingtonville; 41°01′59″N 76°41′31″W	Liberty Township	
6	Gen. William Montgomery House	Gen. William Montgomery House	August 9, 1979 (#79002305)	1 and 3 Bloom Street; 40°57′52″N 76°37′00″W	Danville	
7	Mooresburg School	Mooresburg School	December 30, 1987 (#87002208)	Pennsylvania Routes 45/642; 40°59′06″N 76°41′49″W	Liberty Township	

== See also ==
- List of National Historic Landmarks in Pennsylvania
- National Register of Historic Places listings in Pennsylvania
- List of Pennsylvania state historical markers in Montour County
