= Danville Historic District =

Danville Historic District and variations may refer to:

- Danville Main Street Historic District, Danville, Indiana, listed on the NRHP in Indiana
- Danville Commercial District, Danville, Kentucky, listed on the NRHP in Kentucky
- Danville Historic District (Danville, Pennsylvania), listed on the NRHP in Pennsylvania
- Danville West Market Street Historic District, Danville, Pennsylvania, listed on the NRHP in Pennsylvania
- Danville Historic District (Danville, Virginia), listed on the NRHP in Virginia
- Downtown Danville Historic District, Danville, Virginia, listed on the NRHP in Virginia
- North Danville Historic District, Danville, Virginia, listed on the NRHP in Virginia

== See also ==
- Dansville Downtown Historic District, Dansville, New York, listed on the NRHP in New York
