= Liberty Township, Montour County, Pennsylvania =

Township in Pennsylvania, United States

Coordinates: 41°01′00″N 76°42′59″W

Liberty Township, Mountour County, Pennsylvania
- Township
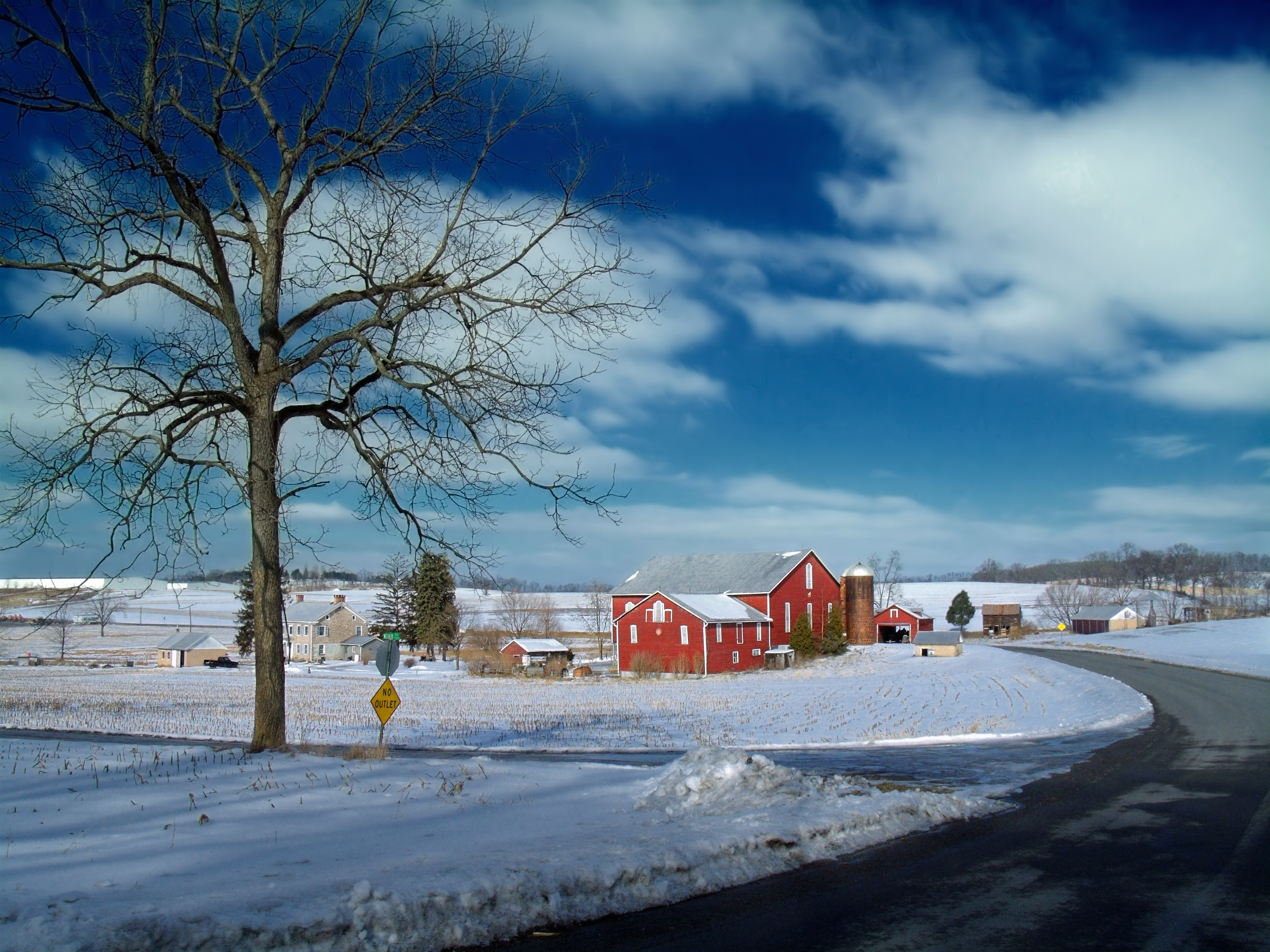
- A farm in the township

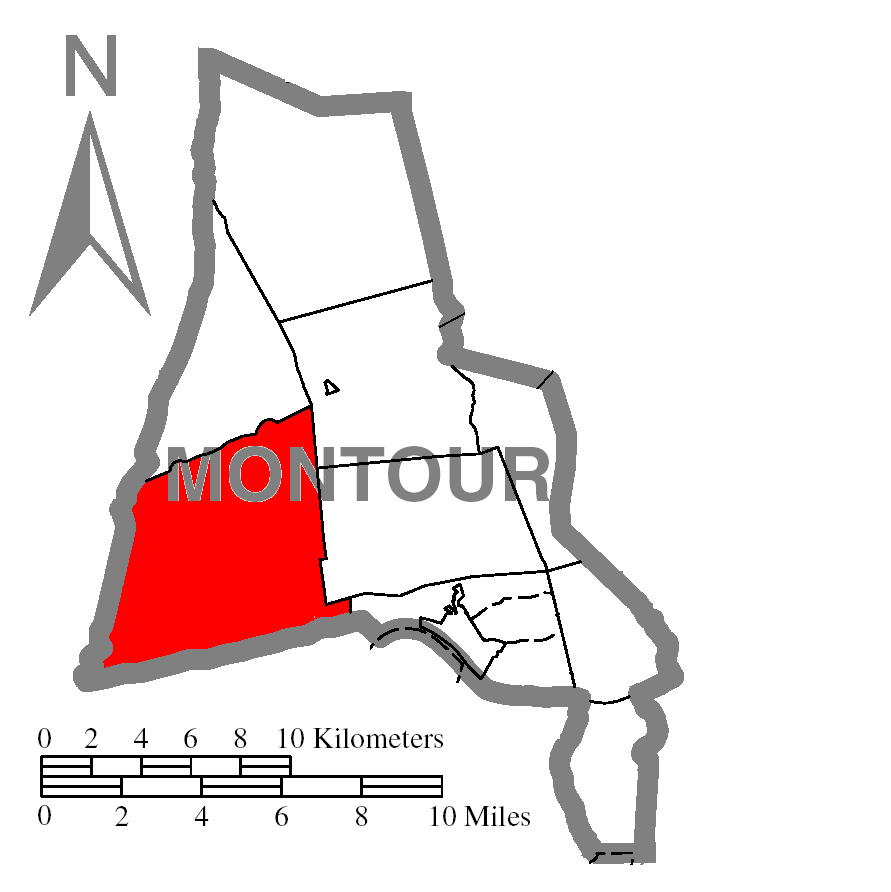
- Map of Montour County, Pennsylvania Highlighting Liberty Township

- Map of Montour County, Pennsylvania
- Country: United States
- State: Pennsylvania
- County: Montour
- Settled: 1771
- Incorporated: 1816

Area
  - Total: 27.45 sq mi (71.09 km^{2})
  - Land: 27.31 sq mi (70.73 km^{2})
  - Water: 0.14 sq mi (0.35 km^{2})

Population (2020)
  - Total: 1,785 ▲
  - Estimate (2021): 1,800
  - Density: 58.9/sq mi (22.73/km^{2})
- FIPS code: 42-093-43112
- Website: http://libertytwsp.com/

Liberty Township is a township in Montour County, Pennsylvania.

== History ==
The Gottlieb Brown Covered Bridge, Keefer Covered Bridge No. 7, and Mooresburg School are listed on the National Register of Historic Places.

== Geography ==
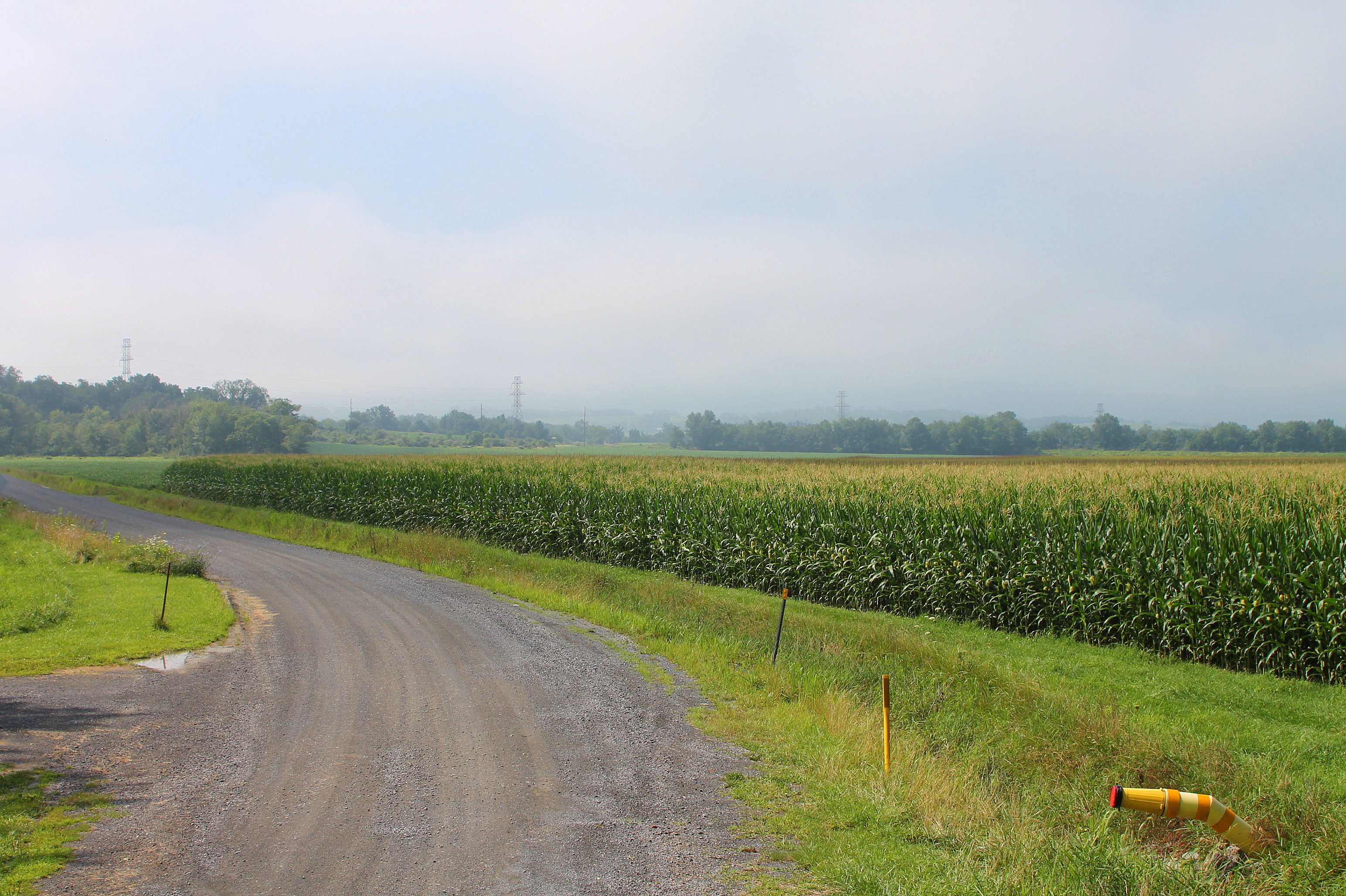
Scenery of Liberty Township, Montour County, Pennsylvania near the Gottlieb Brown Covered Bridge

According to the U.S. Census Bureau, the township has a total area of 27.5 square miles (71.1 km^{2}), all of it land.

== Demographics ==
Historical population
Census	Pop.	Note	%±
2000	1,476		—
2010	1,584		7.3%
2020	1,785		12.7%
2021 (est.)	1,800		0.8%
U.S. Decennial Census

As of the census of 2000, there were 1,476 people, 556 households, and 429 families residing in the township.

The population density was 53.8 inhabitants per square mile (20.8/km^{2}). There were 593 housing units at an average density of 21.6/sq mi (8.3/km^{2}).

The racial makeup of the township was 98.98% White, 0.27% African American, 0.14% Native American, 0.27% Asian, 0.14% from other races, and 0.20% from two or more races. Hispanic or Latino of any race were 0.20% of the population.

There were 556 households, out of which 34.4% had children under the age of eighteen living with them; 68.2% were married couples living together, 6.7% had a female householder with no husband present, and 22.7% were non-families. 18.7% of all households were made up of individuals, and 7.9% had someone living alone who was sixty-five years of age or older.

The average household size was 2.65 and the average family size was 3.02.

In the township the population was spread out, with 25.0% under the age of eighteen, 5.6% from eighteen to twenty-four, 30.4% from twenty-five to forty-four, 27.8% from forty-five to sixty-four, and 11.2% who were sixty-five years of age or older. The median age was forty years.

For every one hundred females, there were 99.7 males. For every one hundred females who were aged eighteen and older, there were 95.9 males.

The median income for a household in the township was $43,500, and the median income for a family was $49,250. Males had a median income of $31,711 compared with that of $23,920 for females.

The per capita income for the township was $19,986.

Roughly 2.1% of families and 3.6% of the population were living below the poverty line, including 1.7% of those who were under the age of eighteen and 4.9% of those who were aged sixty-five or older.

== Notable person ==
- Alexander Billmeyer, member of the U.S. House of Representatives.
