= Dansville Library =

- U.S. National Register of Historic Places
- U.S. Historic district – Contributing property
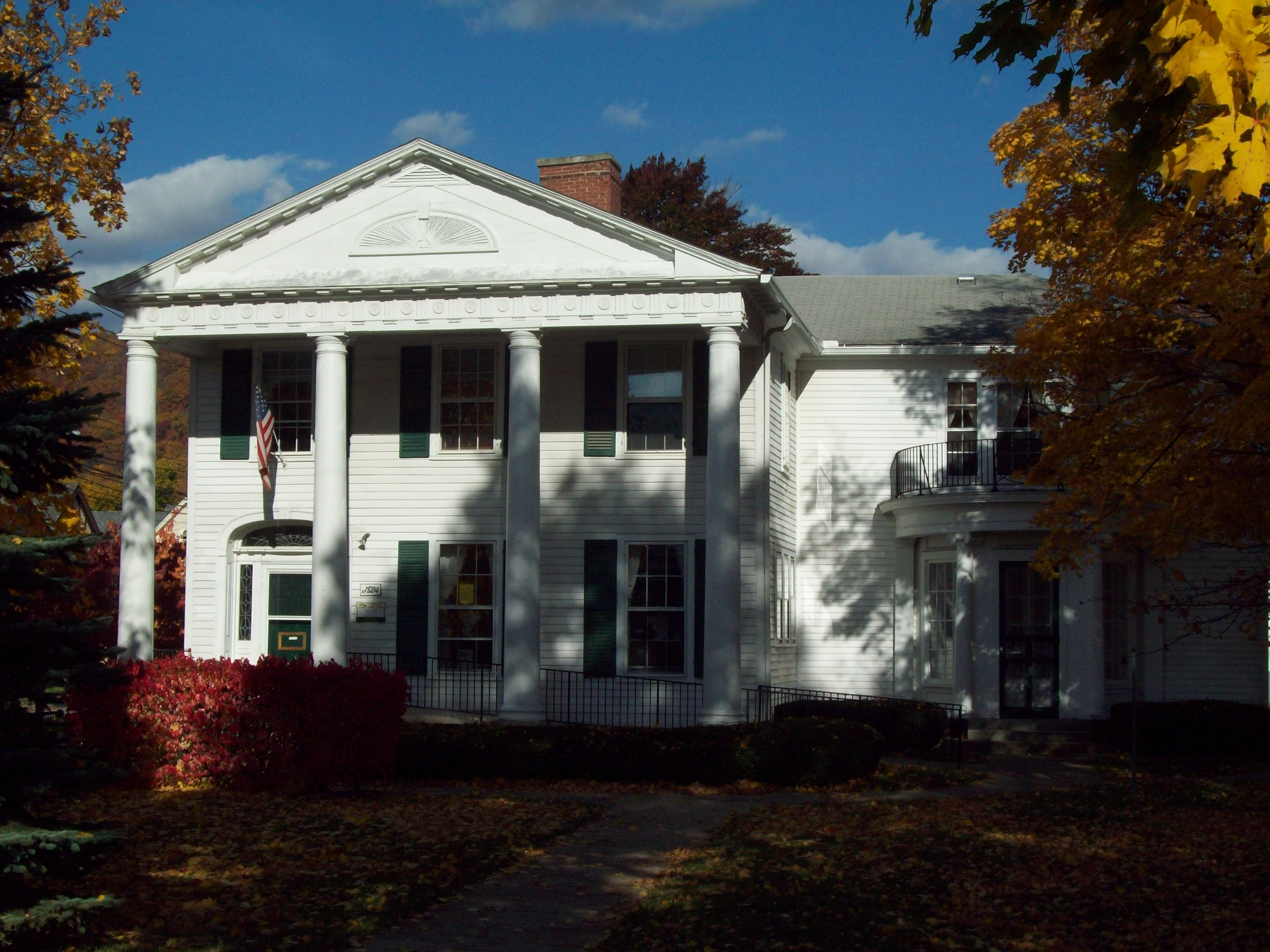
- Dansville Library, October 2009

- Location within New York Location within the United States
- Location: 200 Main St., Dansville, New York
- Coordinates: 42°33′44″N 77°41′49″W
- Area: less than one acre
- Built: 1823
- Architect: Bragdon, Claude
- Architectural style: Neoclassical
- Part of: Dansville Downtown Historic District (ID07000485)
- NRHP reference No.: 77000947
- Added to NRHP: September 14, 1977

Dansville Library is a historic library located at Dansville in Livingston County, New York. It is a large two story Neoclassical style frame structure. It is dramatically enhanced by a pedimented, giant portico covering its full width. The portico features four Doric columns, an elaborate frieze with triglyphs and rosettes, a modillion cornice, and a semi-elliptical fan decoration in the cornice. The earliest section was built in 1823 as a private home for Joshua Shepard (1780–1829). The Shepard family donated the house for use as a library in 1923.

In 2011 a renovation of the building was undertaken in order to bring the facilities of the library up to modern expectations of technological ability and handicap access. A new wing was added to the southeast end of the building, dubbed the Saunders wing after the beneficence of local business mogul E. Philip Saunders and his wife Carol. The interior of the original Shepard building was fully remodeled while the exterior received needed repair and upkeep.

It was listed on the National Register of Historic Places in 1977 and it is a contributing property in the Dansville Downtown Historic District.
