= United States Post Office (Dansville, New York) =

- U.S. Post Office-Dansville
- U.S. National Register of Historic Places
- U.S. Historic district – Contributing property
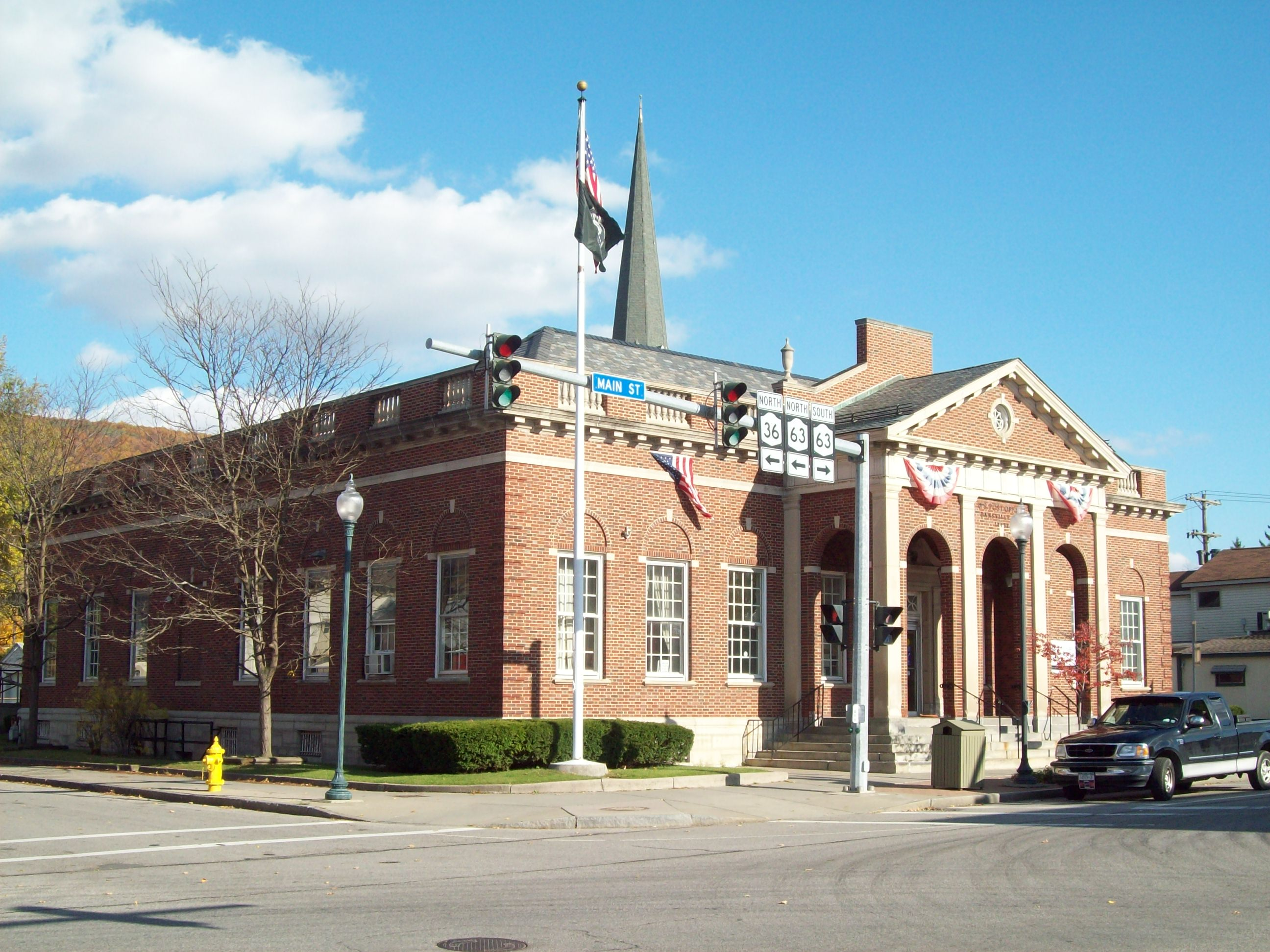
- U.S. Post Office, Dansville, New York, October 2009

- Location within New York Location within the United States
- Interactive map showing the location for U.S. Post Office-Dansville
- Location: 100 Main St., Dansville, New York
- Coordinates: 42°33′35″N 77°41′40″W
- Area: less than one acre
- Built: 1932
- Architect: Office of the Supervising Architect under James A. Wetmore; Charles A. Carpenter
- Architectural style: Colonial Revival
- Part of: Dansville Downtown Historic District (ID07000485)
- MPS: US Post Offices in New York State, 1858-1943, TR
- NRHP reference No.: 88002476
- Added to NRHP: November 17, 1988

The U.S. Post Office in Dansville, New York, United States, is located on Main Street (NY 63). It was designed and built in 1932–1933, and is one of a number of post offices in New York State designed by the Office of the Supervising Architect under James A. Wetmore. The building is in the Colonial Revival style and features an unusual stepped parapet above the portico, blind arches above the windows, and elaborate decoration.

It was listed on the National Register of Historic Places in 1988. It is a contributing property in the Dansville Downtown Historic District.
