= List of Pennsylvania state historical markers in Montour County =

Location of Montour County in Pennsylvania

This is a list of the Pennsylvania state historical markers in Montour County.

This is intended to be a complete list of the official state historical markers placed in Montour County, Pennsylvania by the Pennsylvania Historical and Museum Commission (PHMC). The locations of the historical markers, as well as the latitude and longitude coordinates as provided by the PHMC's database, are included below when available. There are five historical markers located in Montour County.

== Historical markers ==
| Marker title | Image | Date dedicated | Location | Marker type | Topics |
| Christopher Sholes | | March 23, 1948 | U.S. 11 in Danville at Mahoning Creek; 40.9648°N 76.61887°W | Roadside | Business & Industry, Invention, Professions & Vocations |
| First Iron Rails | | May 12, 1947 | U.S. 11 in Danville at Mahoning Creek (Missing); 40.96468°N 76.61848°W | Roadside | Business & Industry, Invention, Railroads, Transportation |
| Fort Bosley | | May 12, 1947 | Pa. 54 at Washingtonville | Roadside | American Revolution, Forts, Military, Mills, Native American |
| Montgomery House | | May 6, 1952 | 1 Bloom St., Danville | City | Early Settlement, Government & Politics, Government & Politics 18th Century, Houses & Homesteads |
| Montour County | | November 10, 1982 | County Courthouse, 29 Mill St., Danville; 40.9603°N 76.619°W | City | Government & Politics, Government & Politics 19th Century, Invention, Iron, Native American, Women |

== See also ==
- List of Pennsylvania state historical markers
- National Register of Historic Places listings in Montour County, Pennsylvania
