= Keefer Covered Bridge No. 7 =

- U.S. National Register of Historic Places
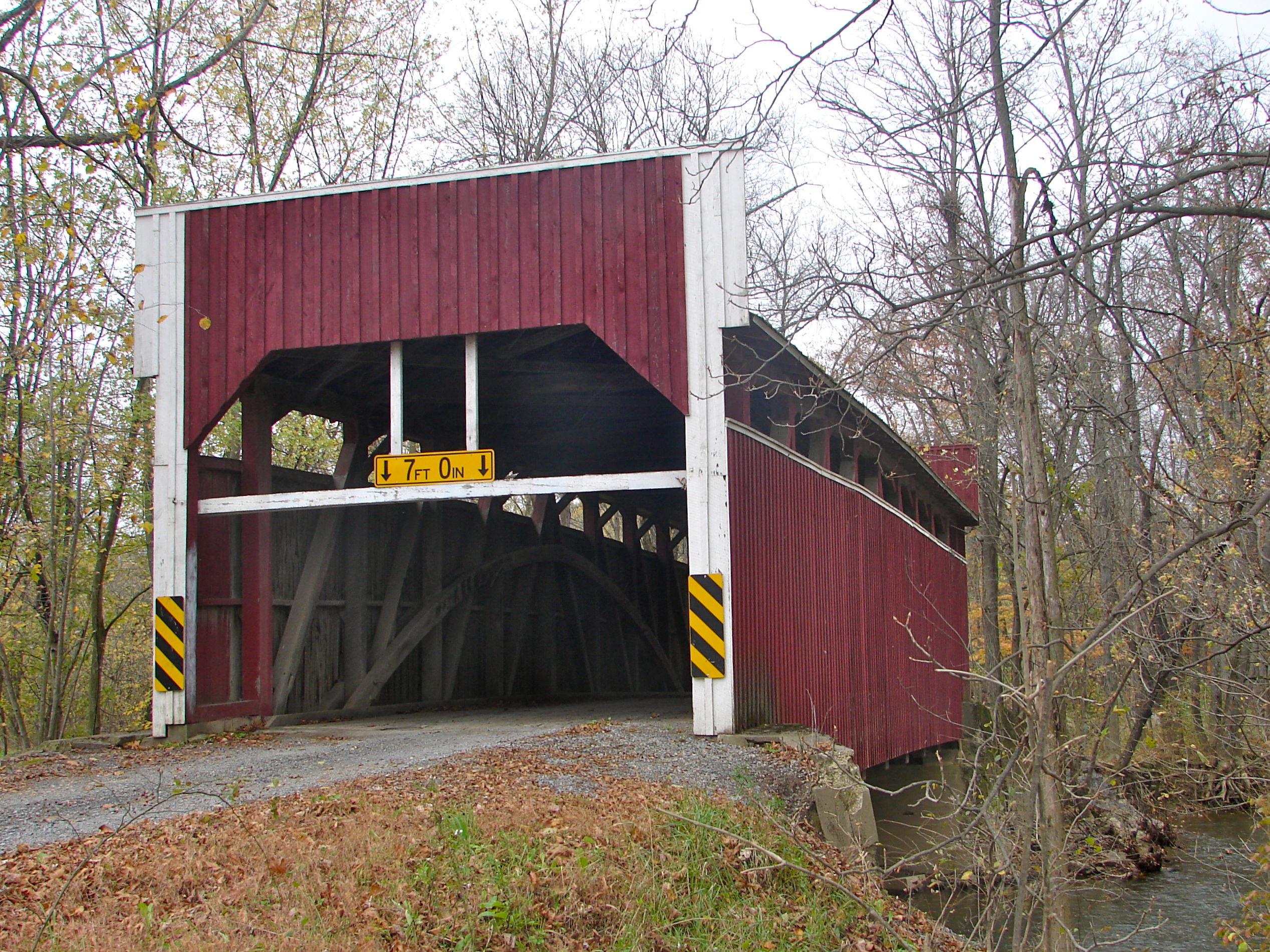
- Keefer Covered Bridge No. 7, October 2011

- Location within Pennsylvania Location within the United States
- Location: Pennsylvania Route 346, southwest of Washingtonville, Liberty Township, Pennsylvania
- Coordinates: 41°1′59″N 76°41′31″W
- Area: 0.1 acres (0.040 ha)
- Built: 1853
- Built by: William Butler
- Architectural style: Burr arch
- MPS: Covered Bridges of Columbia and Montour Counties TR
- NRHP reference No.: 79003174
- Added to NRHP: November 29, 1979

The Keefer Covered Bridge No. 7 is a historic wooden covered bridge located at Liberty Township near Washingtonville in Montour County, Pennsylvania. It is a 78 foot long, Burr Truss bridge built in 1853. It has a square opening; rare for covered bridges in Pennsylvania. It crosses Chillisquaque Creek.

It was listed on the National Register of Historic Places in 1979.
