= Dansville Downtown Historic District =

Historic district in New York, United States

- U.S. National Register of Historic Places
- U.S. Historic district
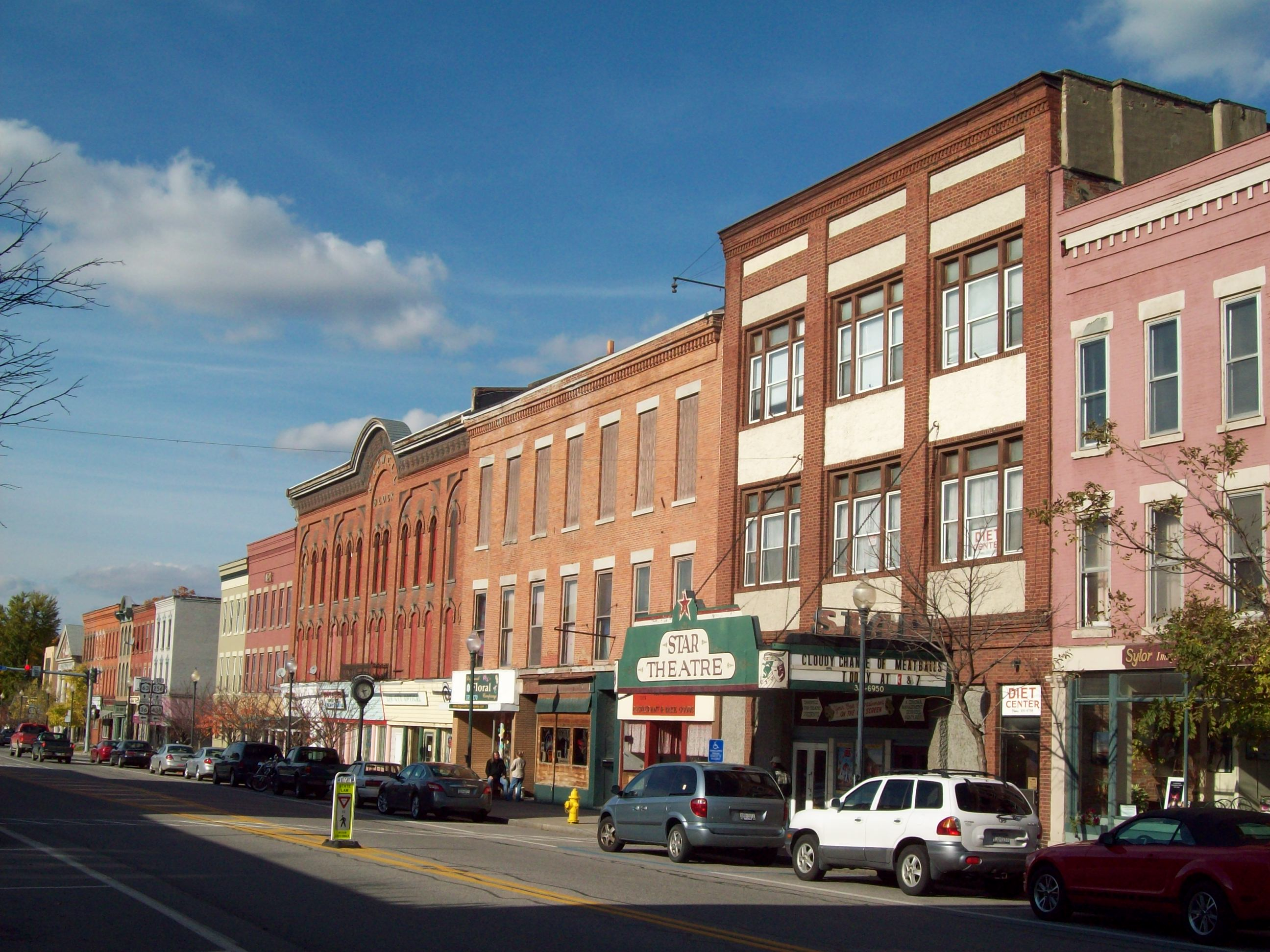
- Dansville Downtown Historic District, October 2009

- Location within New York
- Location: Main St., Ossian St., Dansville, New York
- Area: 12 acres (4.9 ha)
- Architectural style: Greek Revival, Classical Revival
- NRHP reference No.: 07000485
- Added to NRHP: June 01, 2007

Dansville Downtown Historic District is a national historic district located at Dansville in Livingston County, New York. The district consists of the highly intact three block commercial core of Dansville. It includes 50 contributing buildings, mainly brick and commercial in character. They were constructed between about 1835 and about 1900, and are two or three stories in height. Within the district are the separately listed US Post Office-Dansville and Shepard Memorial Library.

It was listed on the National Register of Historic Places in 2007.
