= Thomas Beaver Free Library and Danville YMCA =

- U.S. National Register of Historic Places
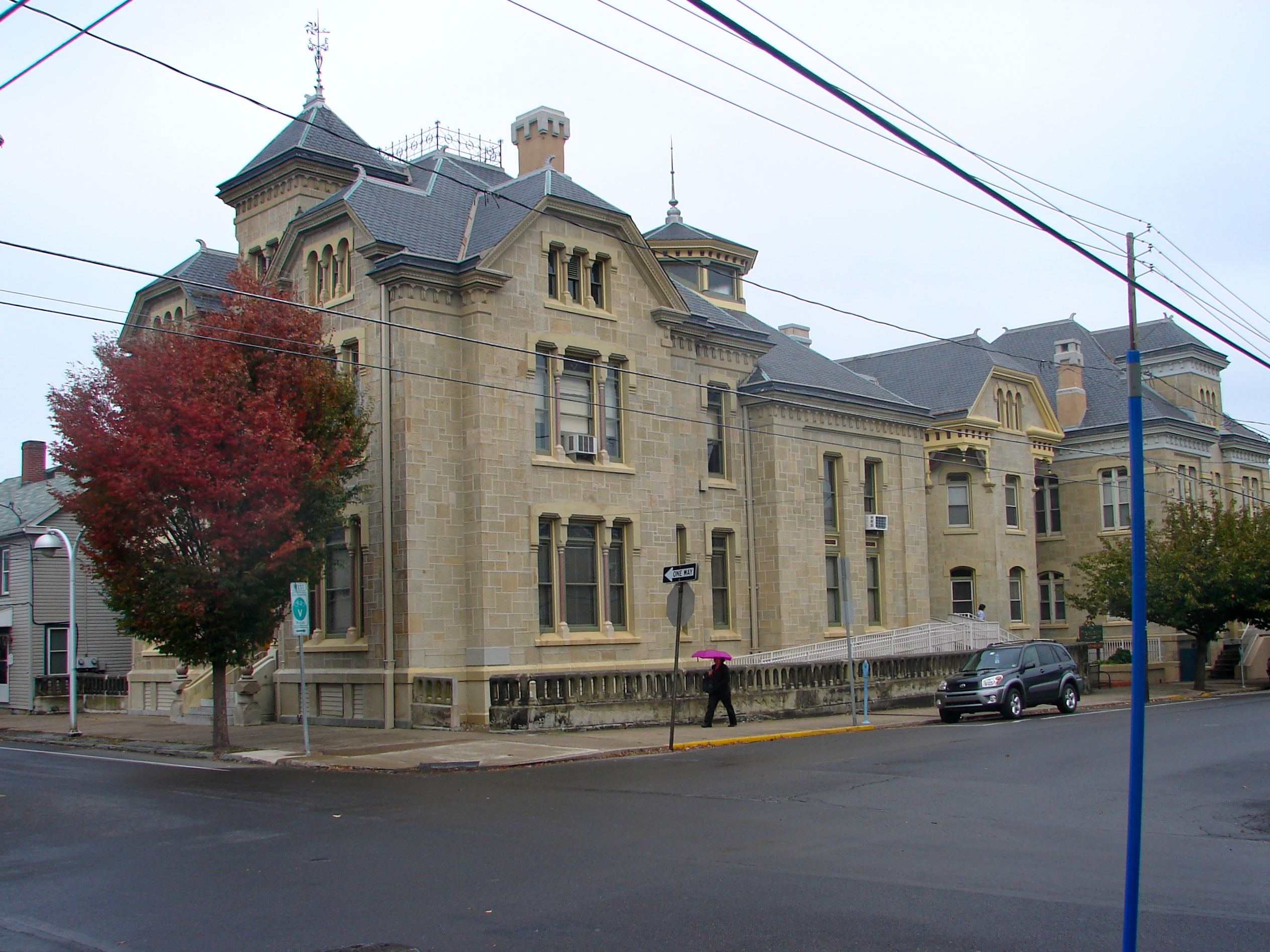
- Beaver Free Library, October 2011

- Location within Pennsylvania Location within the United States
- Location: E. Market and Ferry Sts., Danville, Pennsylvania
- Coordinates: 40°57′36″N 76°36′23″W
- Area: 0.3 acres (0.12 ha)
- Built: 1886
- Built by: Voris, Archibald
- Architect: Wetzel, Charles
- Architectural style: Second Empire, Queen Anne
- Website: https://tbflibrary.org/
- NRHP reference No.: 86003578
- Added to NRHP: January 15, 1987

Thomas Beaver Free Library and Danville YMCA is a historic library and former YMCA located at Danville, Montour County, Pennsylvania. The two attached buildings were built starting in 1886 and ending in 1888. They are 2 1/2-story, sandstone buildings with slate roofs in a combined Queen Anne / Second Empire style. The buildings feature an octagonal cupola, corbelled stone chimneys, a hipped roof tower, and terra cotta ornament.

It was added to the National Register of Historic Places in 1987.

Thomas Beaver (1814-1891) was a successful businessman who was a prominent Danville resident. He donated the library building in 1888. The opening was celebrated with fireworks and a parade.

As of 2020, The Thomas Beaver Free Library serves a population of over 20,000 people. The Library is governed by a Board of Trustees that consists of 15 members. Their responsibilities include the operation and management of the library, directing finances, planning, evaluations, and policy-making. The staff of the Library includes a full time Director and 11 part-time employees who work the daily operations and provide services.

The Thomas Beaver Free Library, as of 2019, received approximately 20% of its operating funds from State Aid and the rest of their budget from local fundraising, grants, memorial gifts, donations, and savings reserves.

== Services ==
The Thomas Beaver Free Library services include staff assistance for locating and borrowing books both in the physical library and online, computer and internet access, photocopying, adult programs, and children's programs. The library also offers the Libby (service) to borrow e-books and other digital materials. The library has a link to the Power Library for both kids and teens to use. Another service offered is Mango Languages for anyone who would like to learn a second language. The website has a link to access Danville news and historical articles.

== Gallery ==
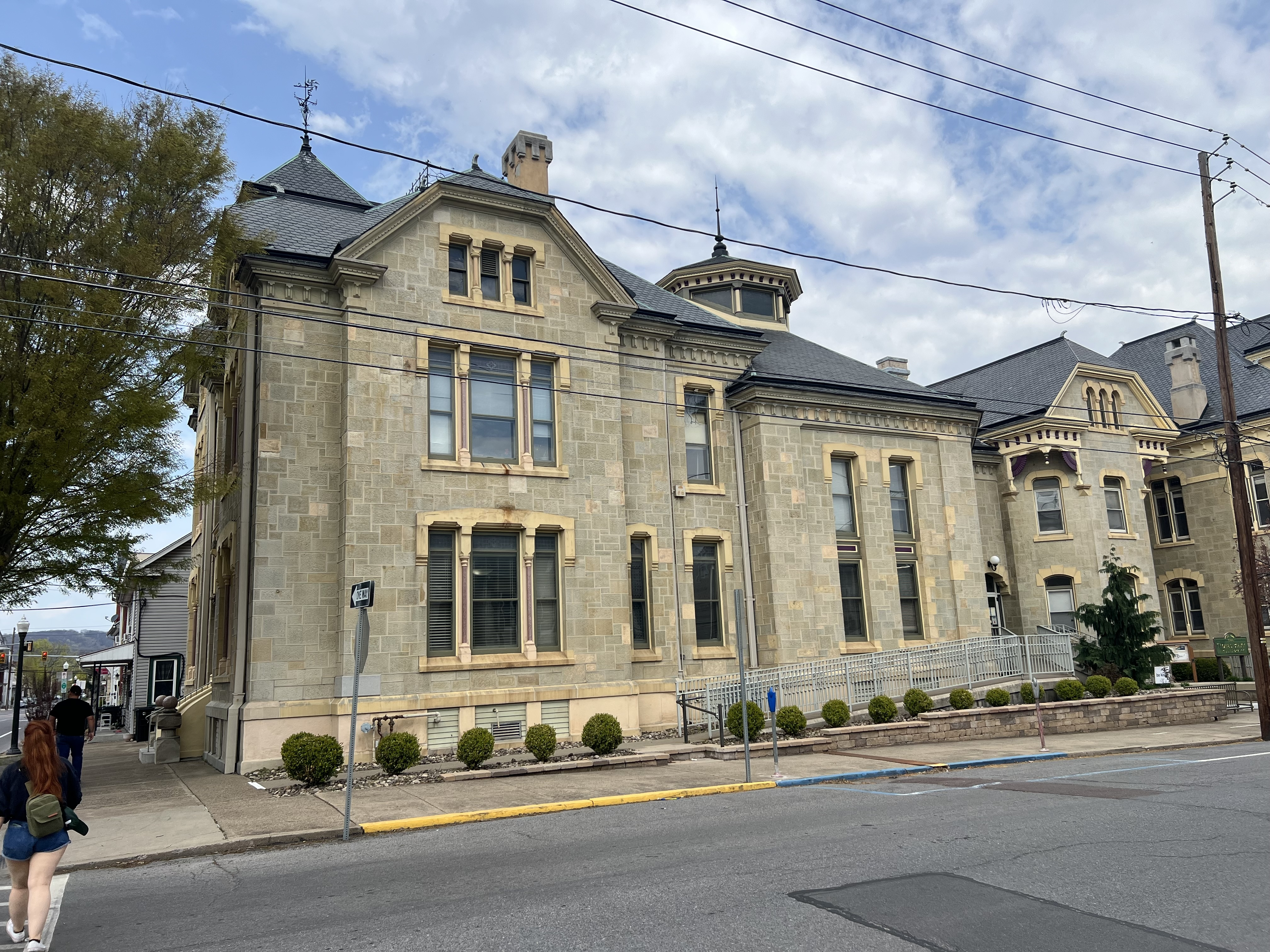
Exterior of Thomas Beaver Free Library

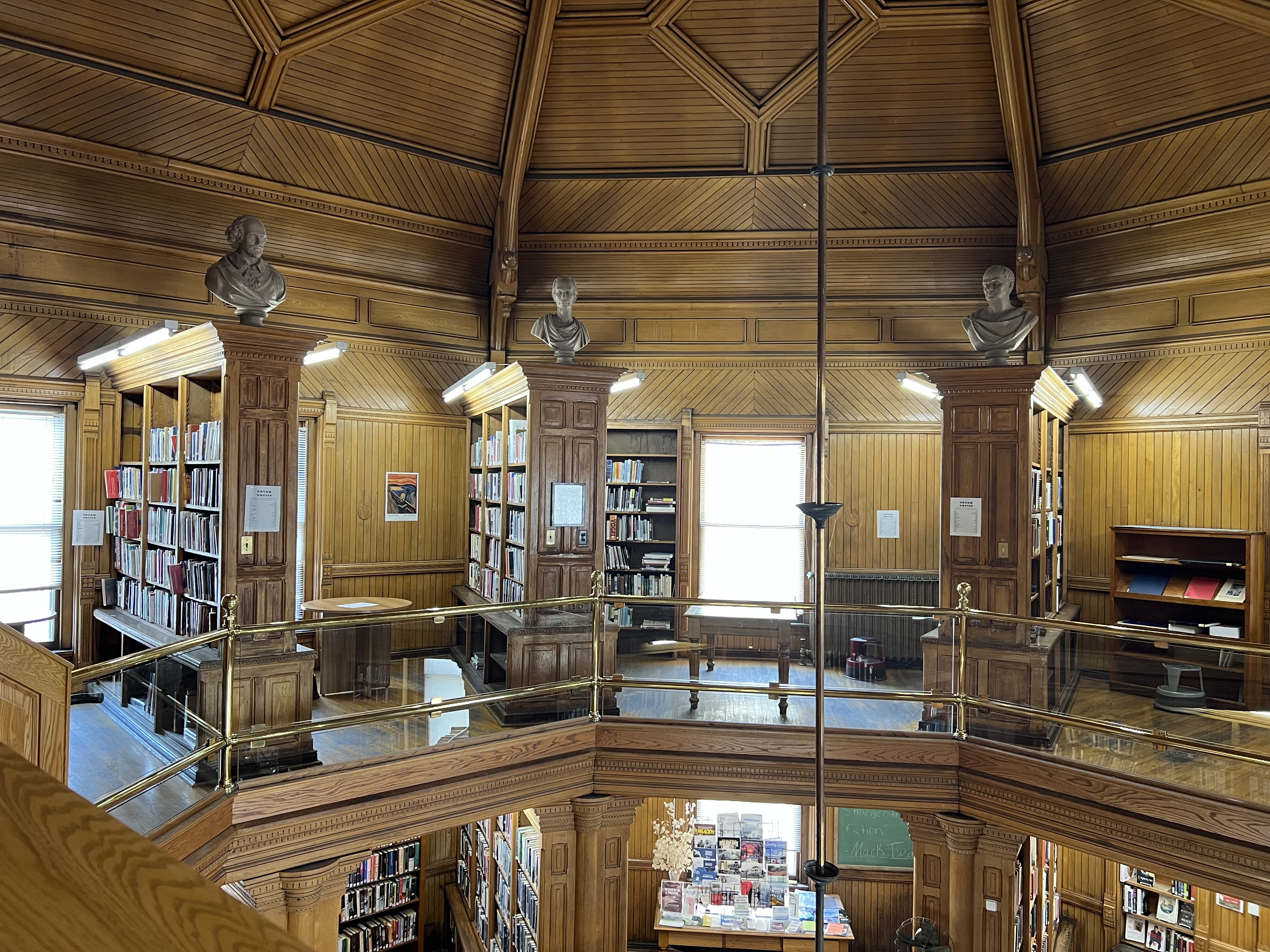
Second floor of the Thomas Beaver Free Library

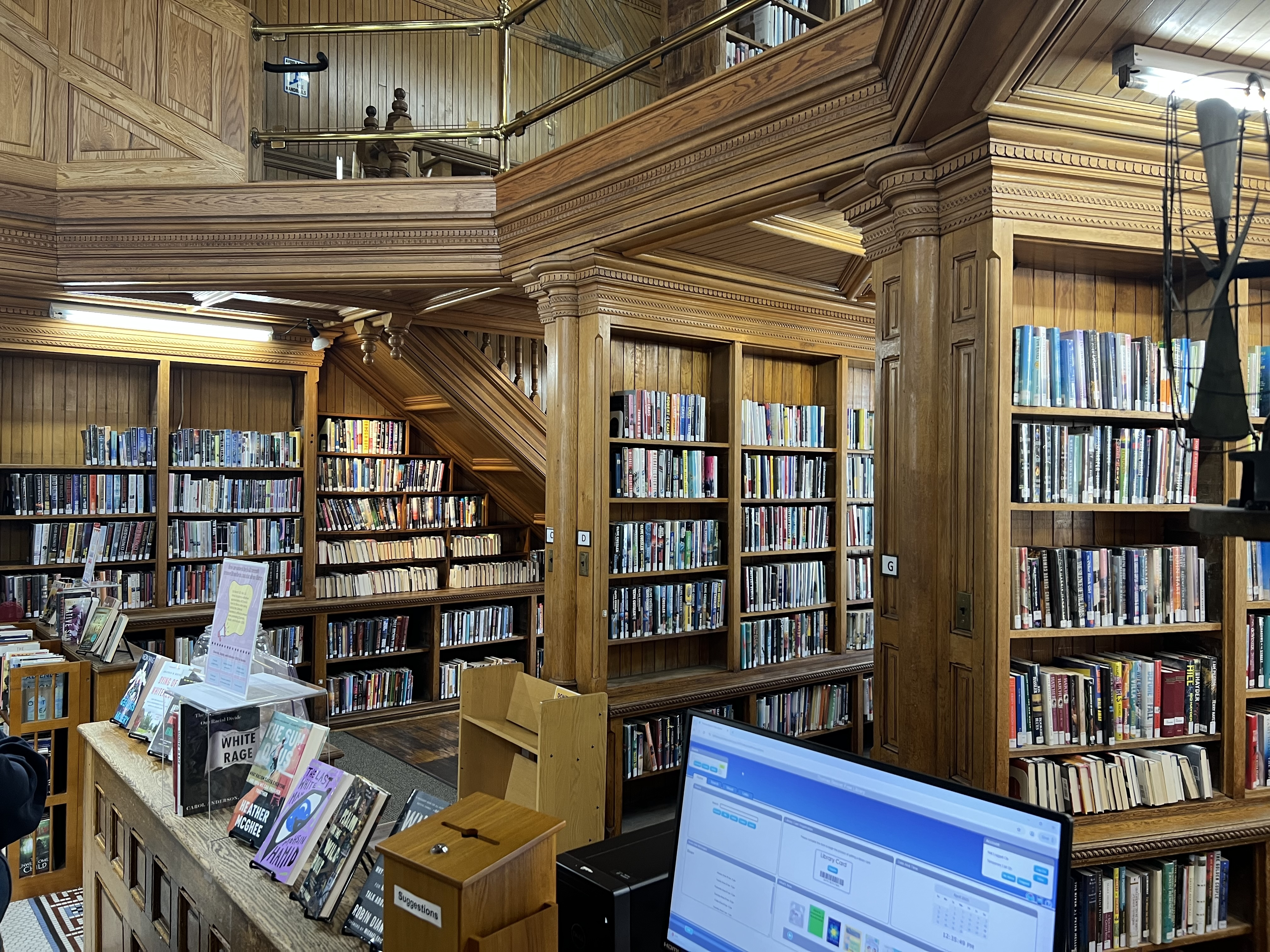
First floor of the Thomas Beaver Free Library

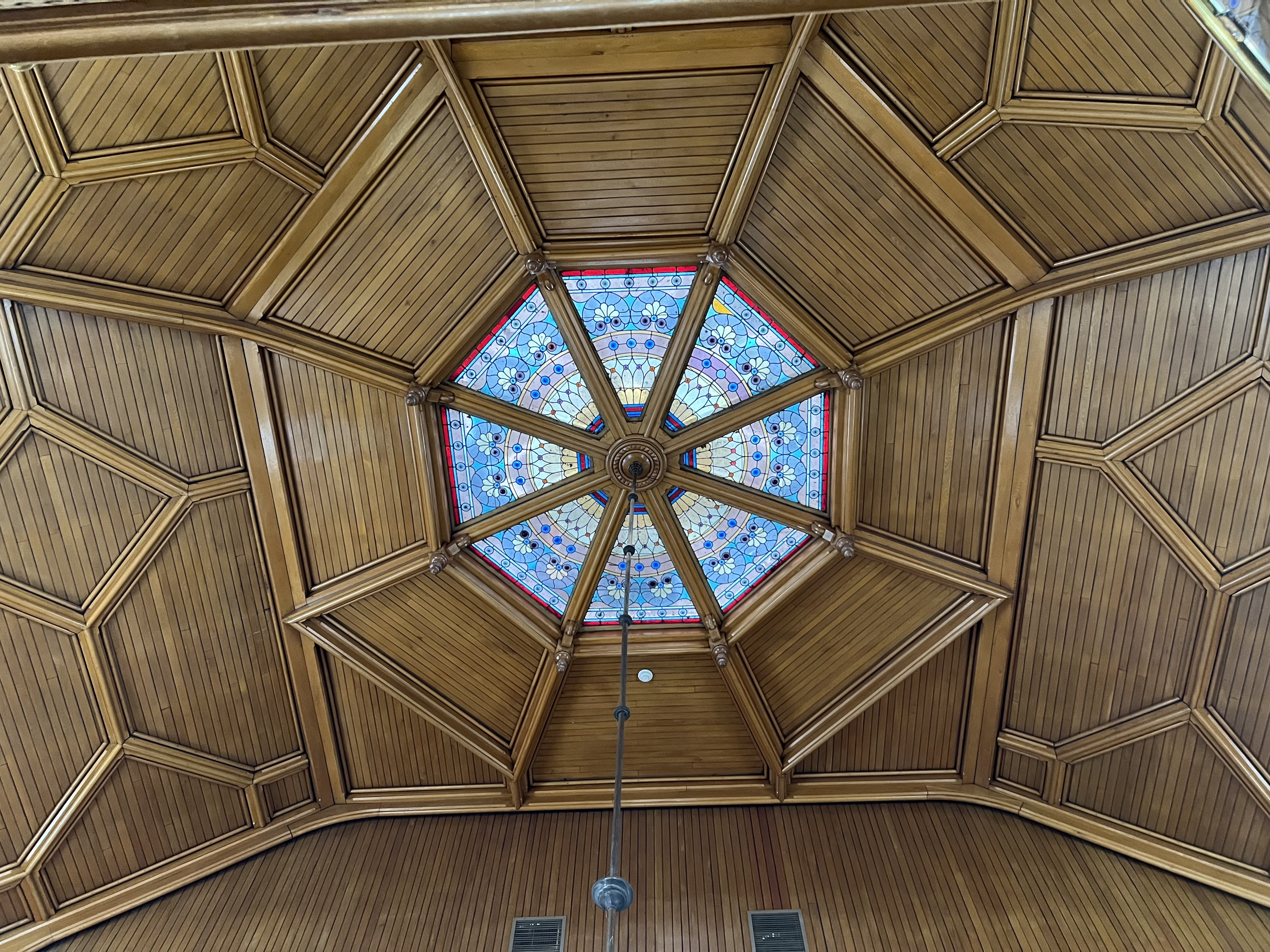
Ceiling of the Thomas Beaver Free Library

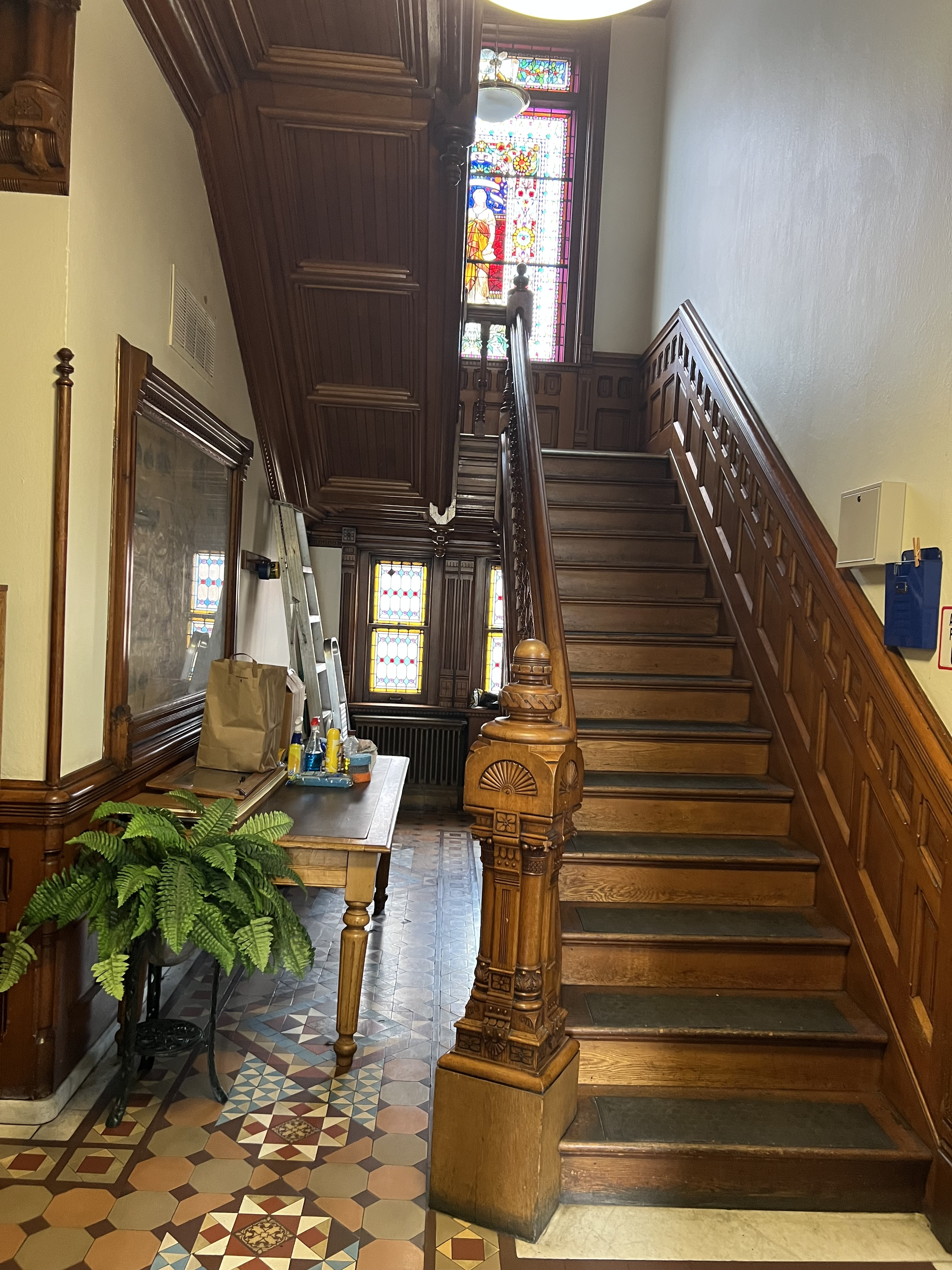
Staicase in the Thomas Beaver Free Library

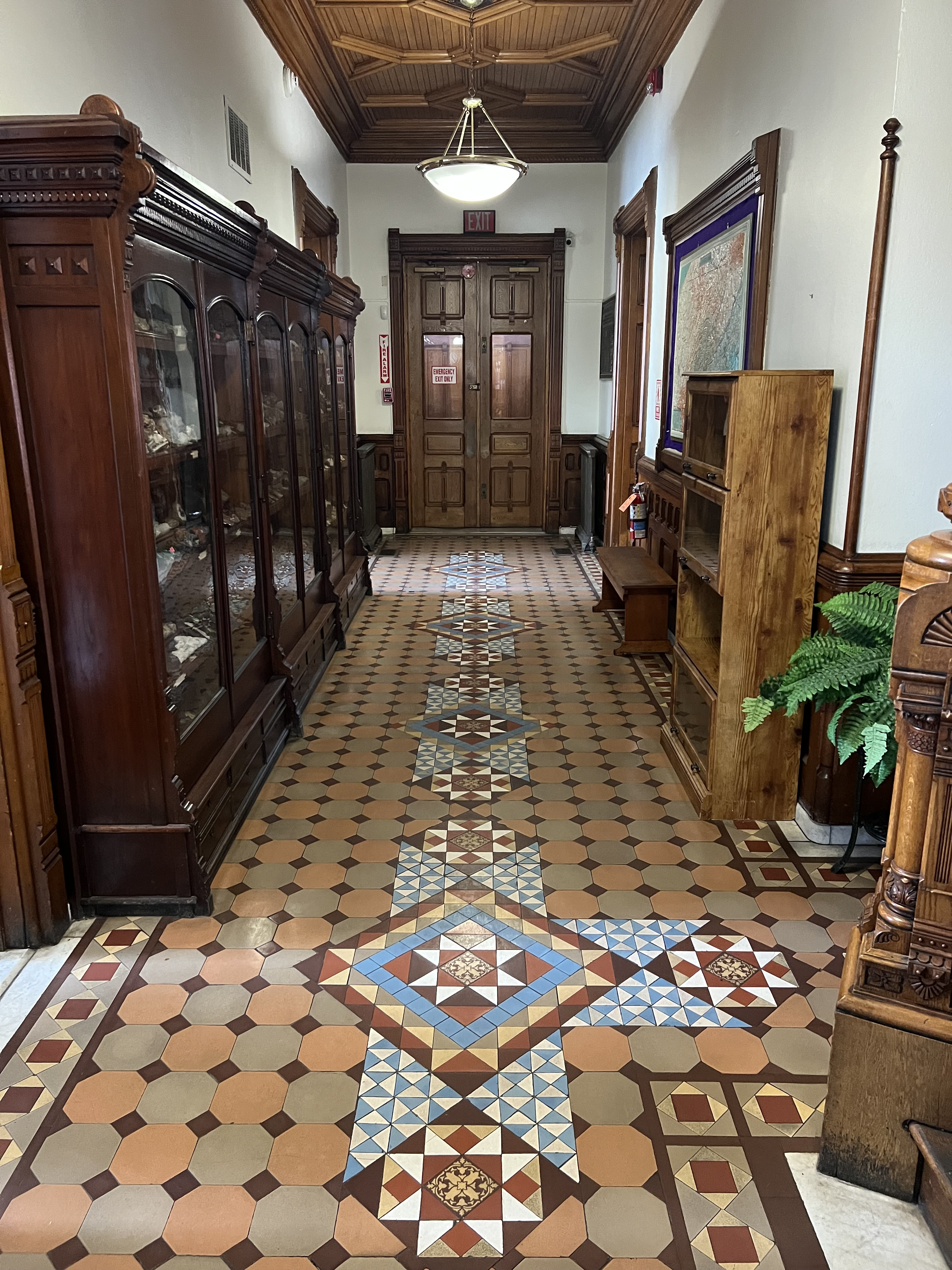
Back hallway of the Thomas Beaver Free Library

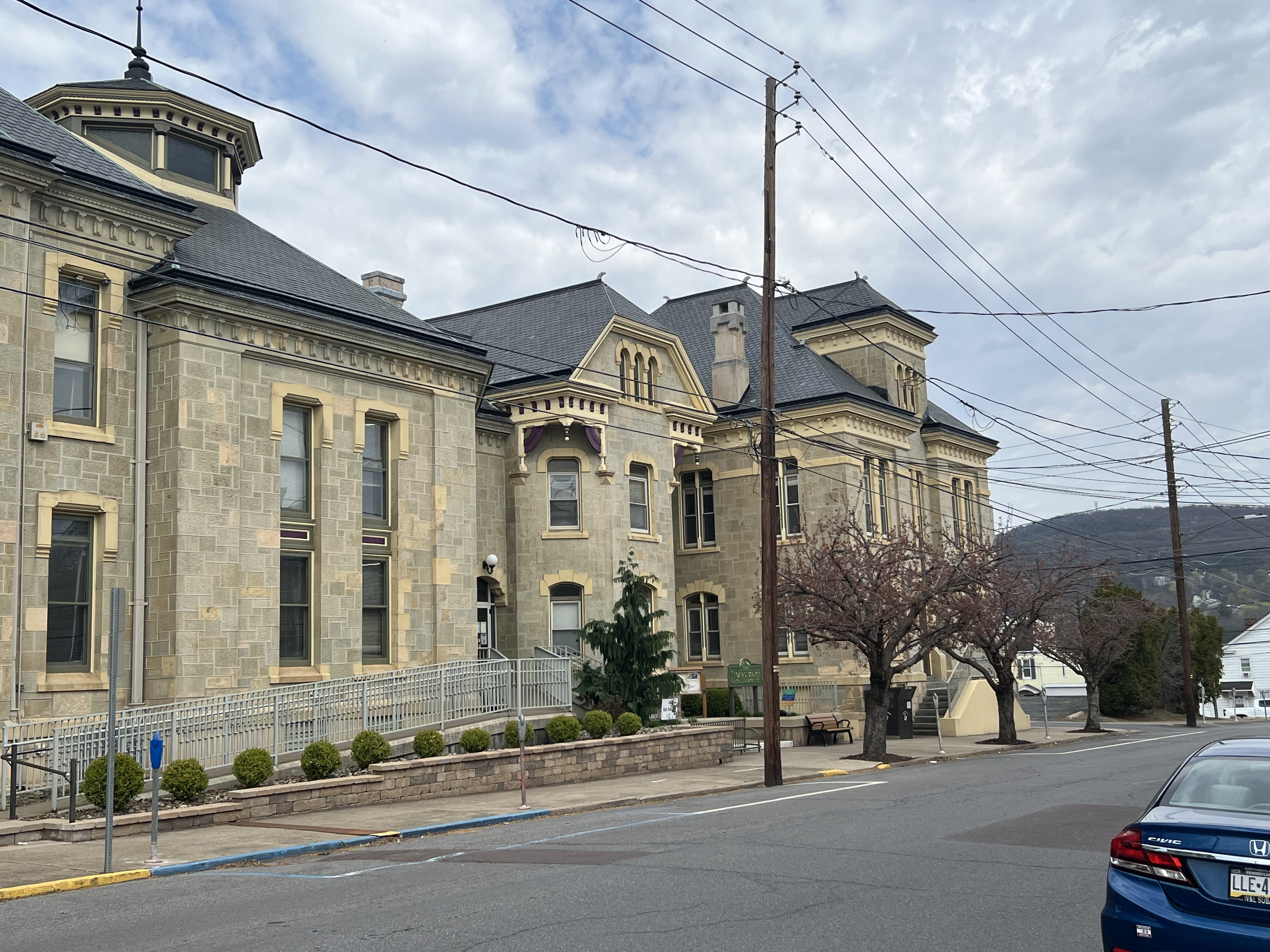
Second exterior of the Thomas Beaver Free Library

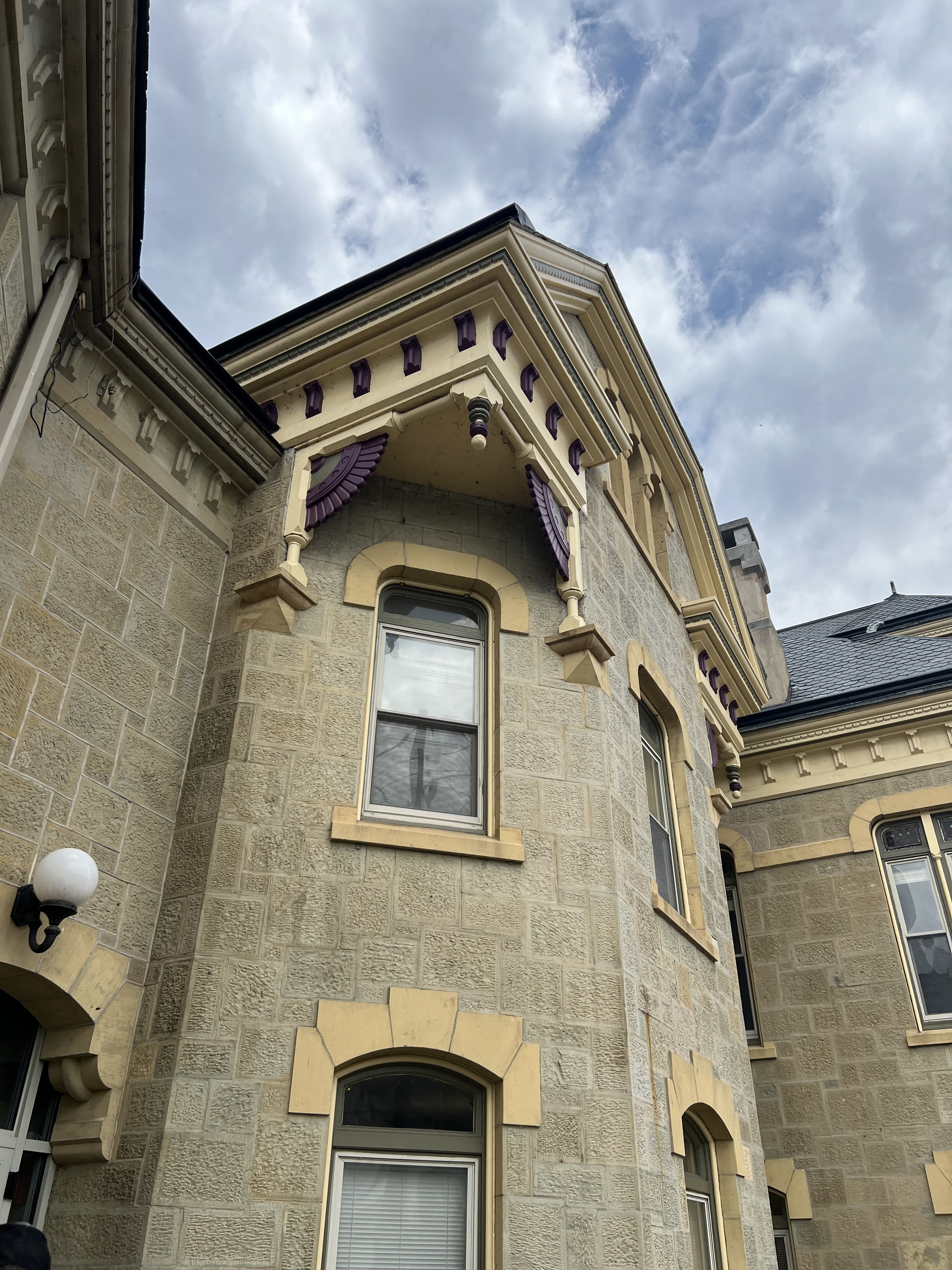
Third exterior of the Thomas Beaver Free Library

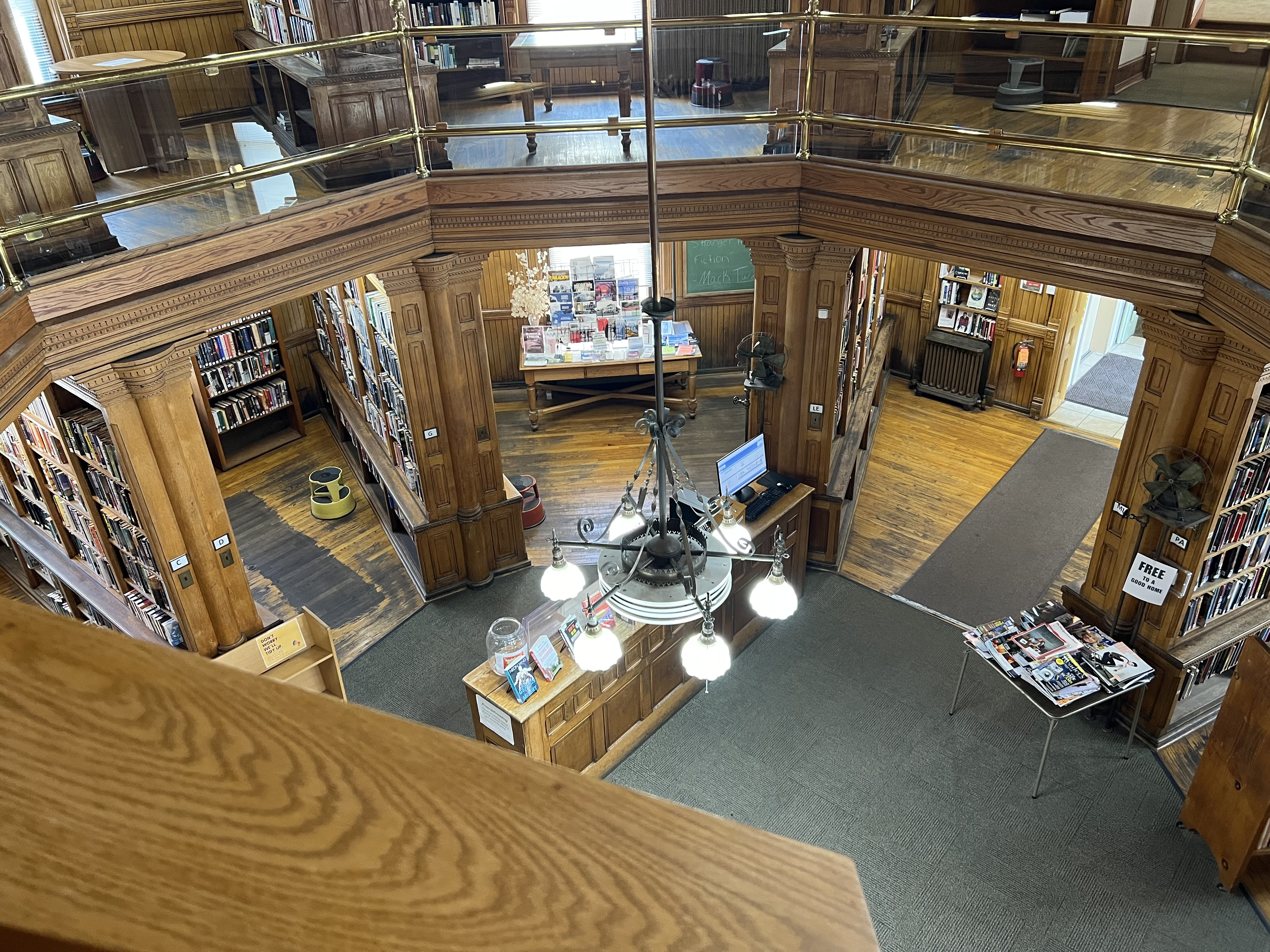
Second floor looking down to the first floor of the Thomas Beaver Free Library

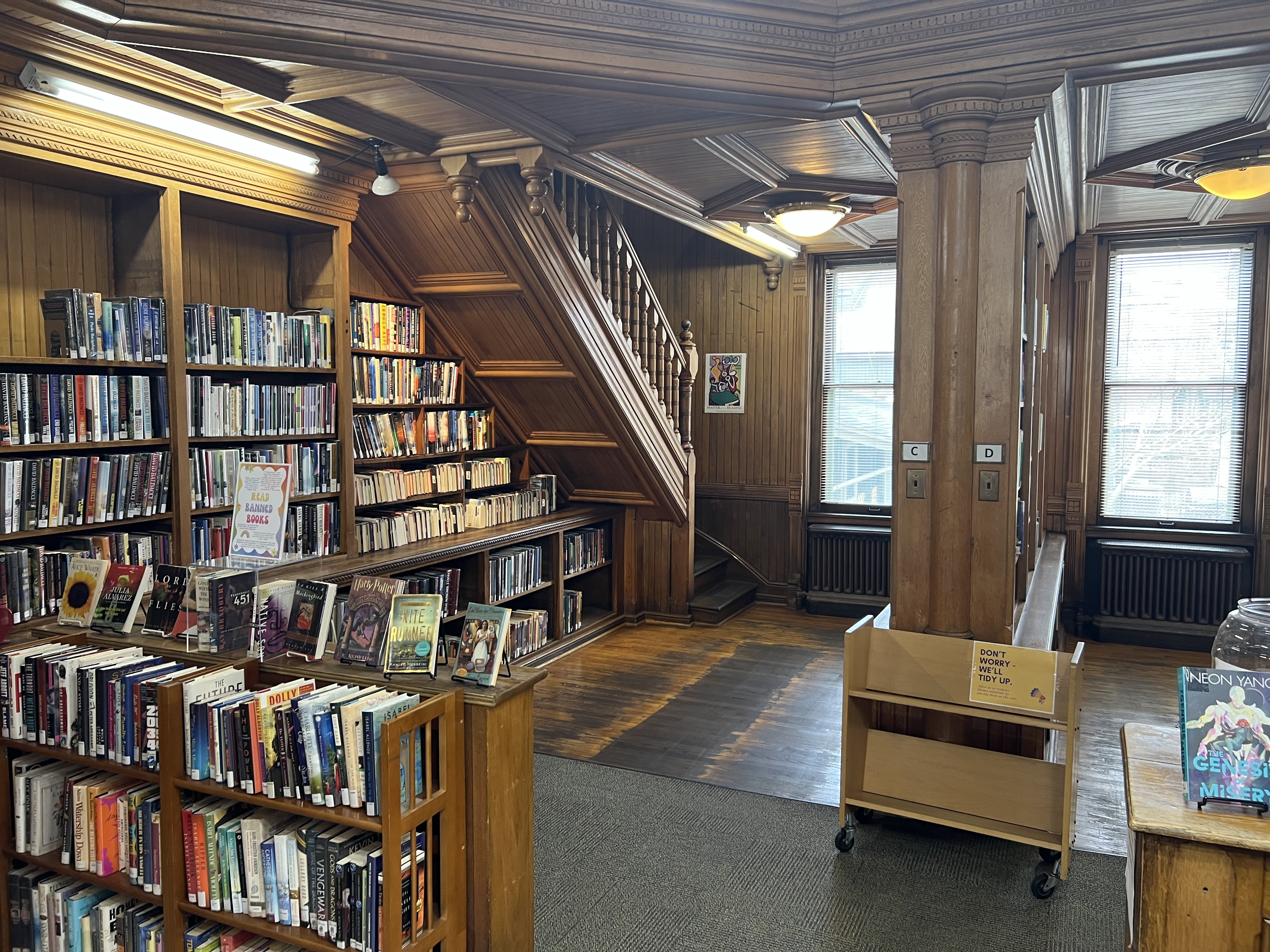
Alternate first floor of the Thomas Beaver Free Library

== See also ==
- List of YMCA buildings and structures
- National Register of Historic Places listings in Montour County, Pennsylvania
