= Danville Historic District (Danville, Pennsylvania) =

Historic district in Pennsylvania, United States

- U.S. National Register of Historic Places
- U.S. Historic district
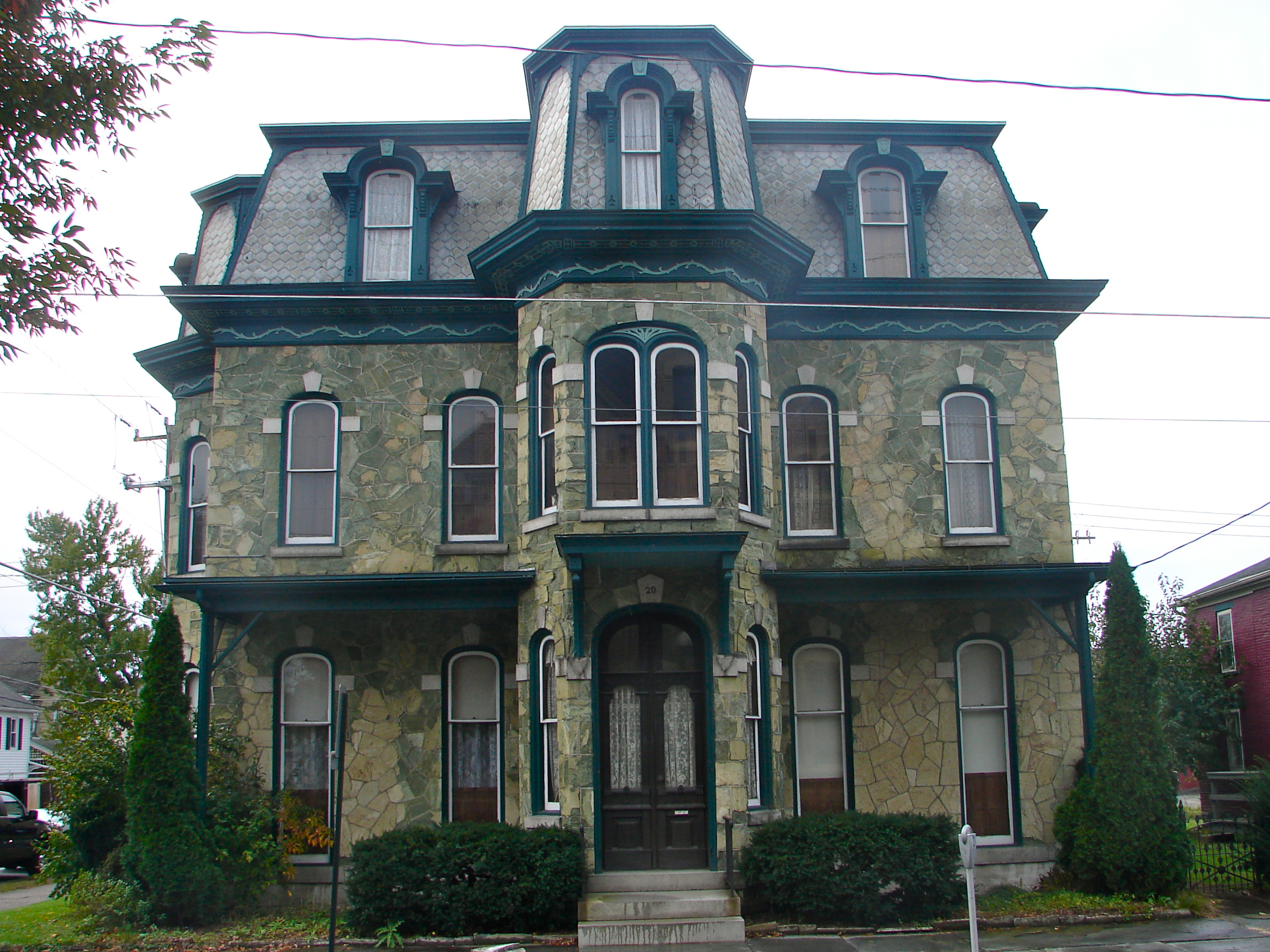
- Home in the Danville Historic District, October 2011

- Location within Pennsylvania Location within the United States
- Location: Roughly bounded by Bloom St., Cedar St., the Susquehanna R. and Chestnut St., Danville, Pennsylvania
- Coordinates: 40°57′42″N 76°37′02″W
- Area: 77.2 acres (31.2 ha)
- Built: 1792
- Architect: Wetzell, Charles, et al.
- Architectural style: Italianate, Federal, Queen Anne
- NRHP reference No.: 94000828
- Added to NRHP: August 18, 1994

Danville Historic District is a national historic district located in Danville, Montour County, Pennsylvania. It encompasses 291 contributing buildings, 3 contributing sites, and 1 contributing object in the central business district and surrounding residential areas of Danville. The buildings mostly date from the 1840s to the early 20th century. The district incorporates the previously listed and predominantly residential Danville West Market Street Historic District. Residential buildings are mostly of brick and frame construction, with some log and stone dwellings, and in a variety of architectural styles including Italianate, Federal, Queen Anne and Second Empire. It includes the separately listed General William Montgomery House and Thomas Beaver Free Library and Danville YMCA. Other notable non-residential buildings include the Montour County Courthouse (1871), Mahoning Presbyterian Church (1853), Pine Street Lutheran Church (c. 1860), Eli Trego Building, Heim Suspender Factory (1835), First Ward School (c. 1870), Bnai Zion Temple (c. 1865), and Jemima Donaldson's Cross Keys Tavern (c. 1812).

It was added to the National Register of Historic Places in 1994.

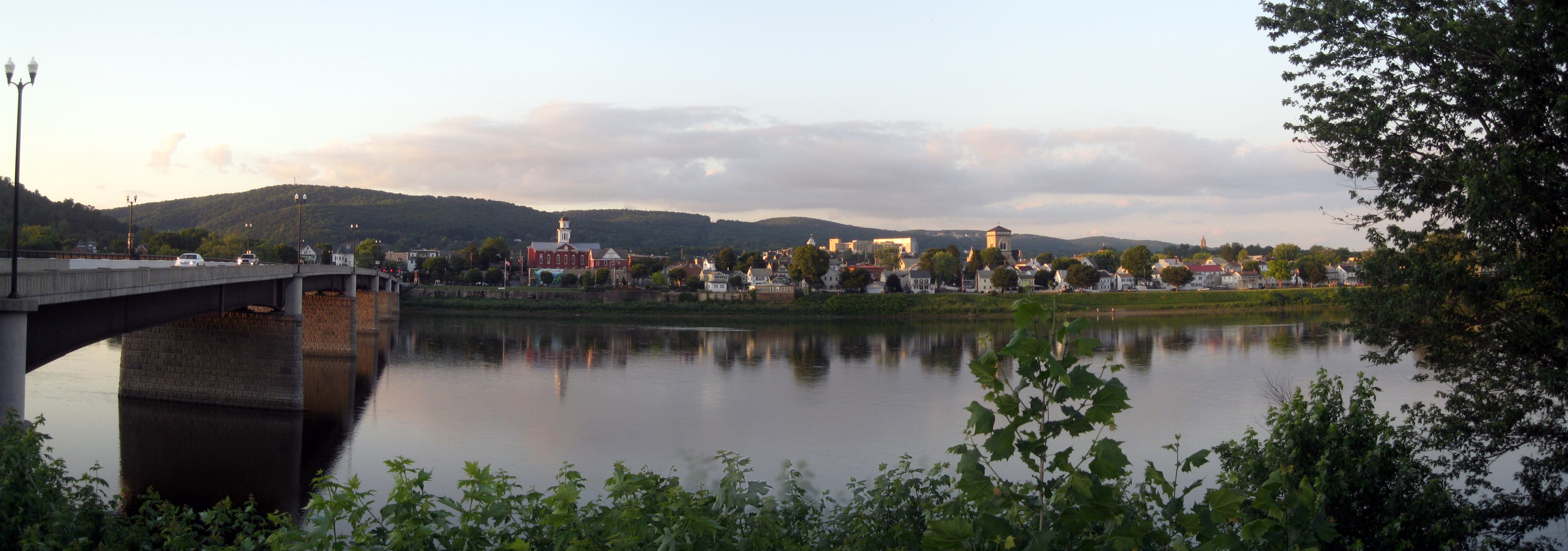
View from across the Susquehanna River
