= Mooresburg School =

- U.S. National Register of Historic Places
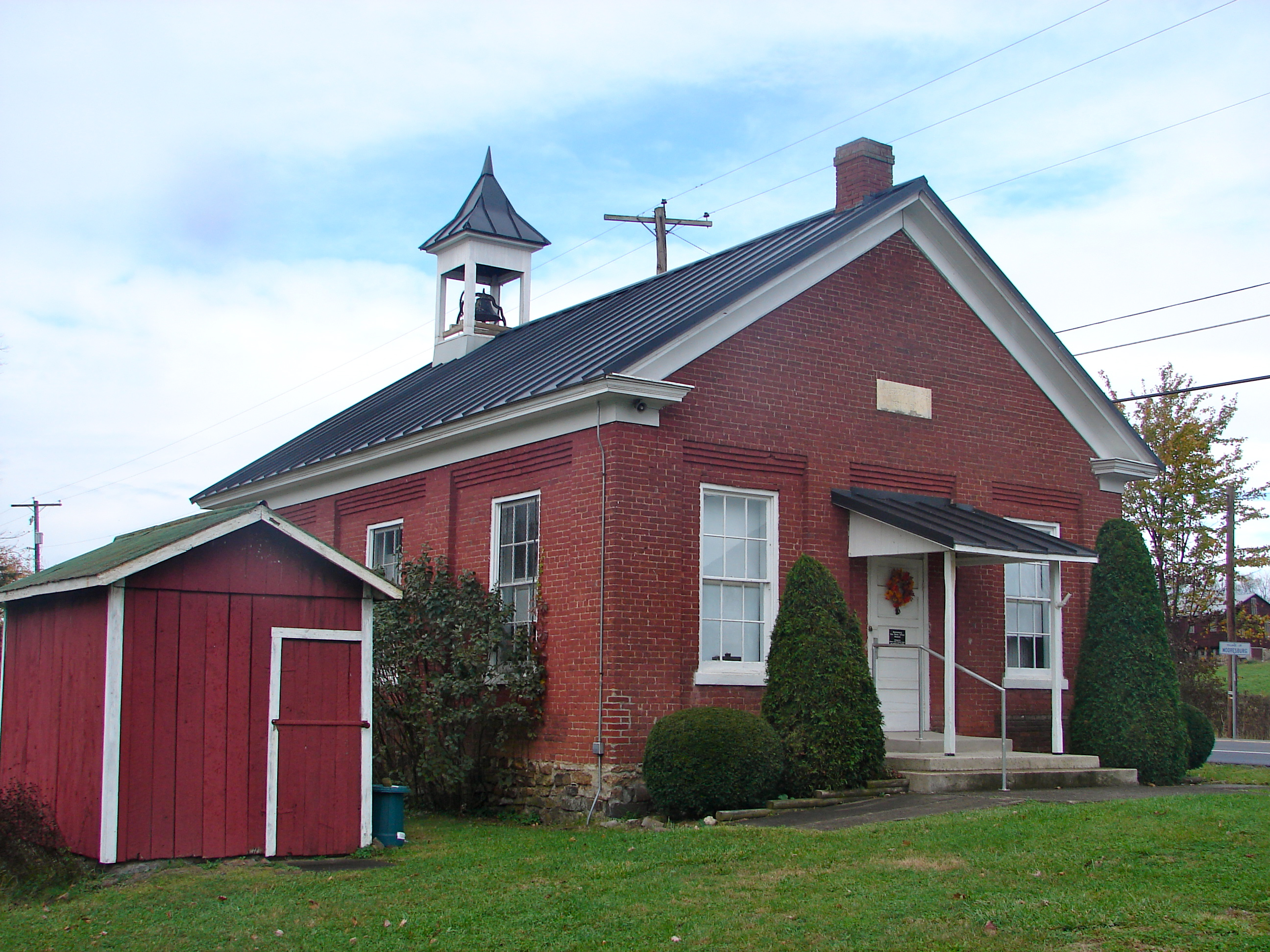

- Location within Pennsylvania Location within the United States
- Location: PA 642/45, Mooresburg, Pennsylvania
- Coordinates: 40°59′07″N 76°41′48″W
- Area: 1.1 acres (0.45 ha)
- Built: 1875
- NRHP reference No.: 87002208
- Added to NRHP: December 30, 1987

The Mooresburg School is a one-story building that is located in Mooresburg, Pennsylvania, USA. It was built in 1875 by Liberty Township.

It was listed on the National Register of Historic Places in 1987.

== History and architectural features ==
The Mooresburg One Room School was built in 1875 by Liberty Township near the small village of Mooresburg, and rebuilt by the township in 1891, according to its datestone.

It is a brick, vernacular building measuring thirty-five feet by twenty-eight feet that sits on a fieldstone foundation. Located on the south side of Pennsylvania Route 642 and Pennsylvania Route 45 one half mile east of Mooresburg,

The school continued to educate local children in grades one through eight until 1964 when the building was acquired by the Montour County Historical Society. It is now a museum.

== Gallery ==
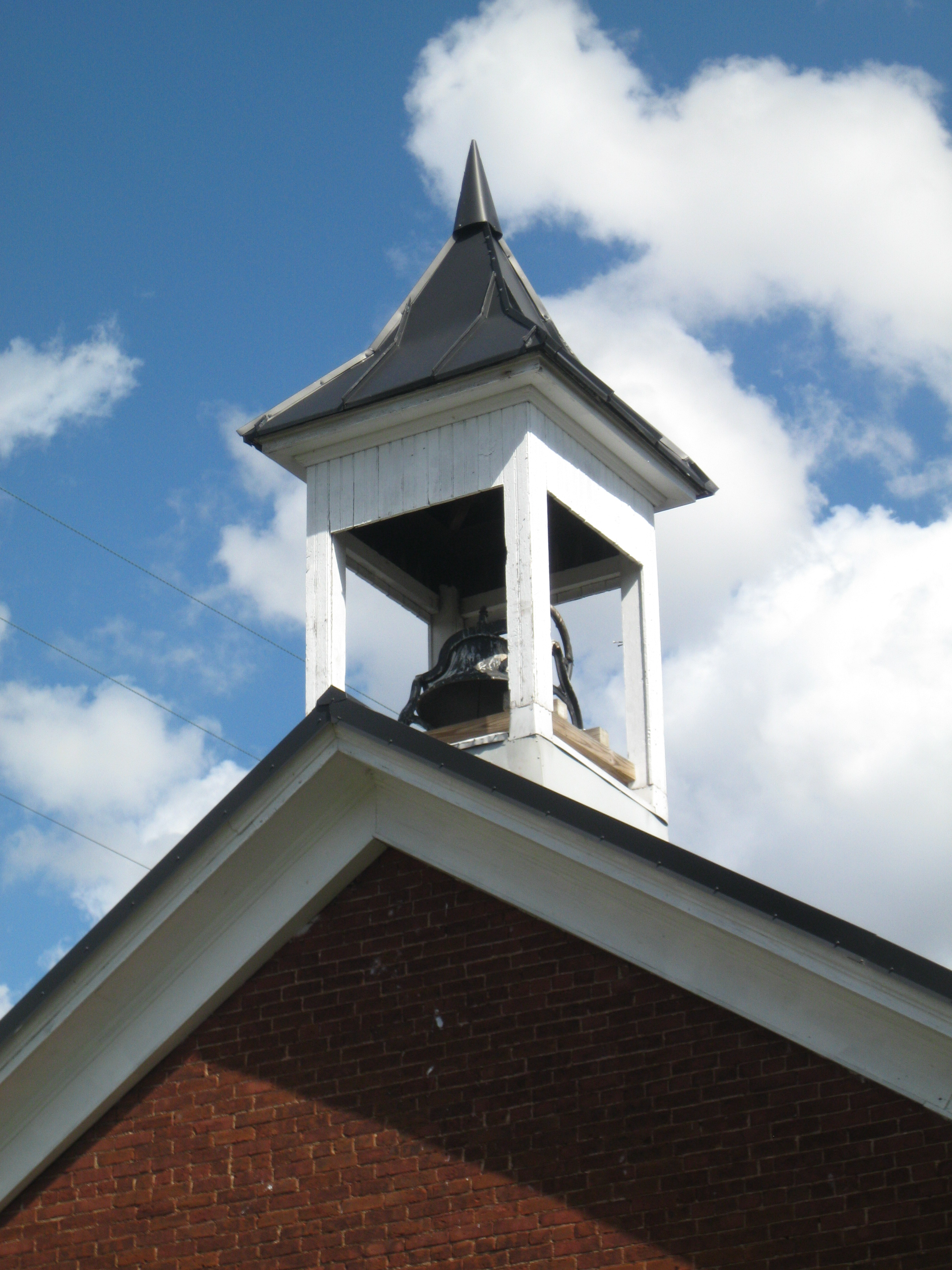
Cupola

== See also ==
- Education in the United States
- National Register of Historic Places
