= Danville West Market Street Historic District =

Historic district in Pennsylvania, United States

- U.S. National Register of Historic Places
- U.S. Historic district
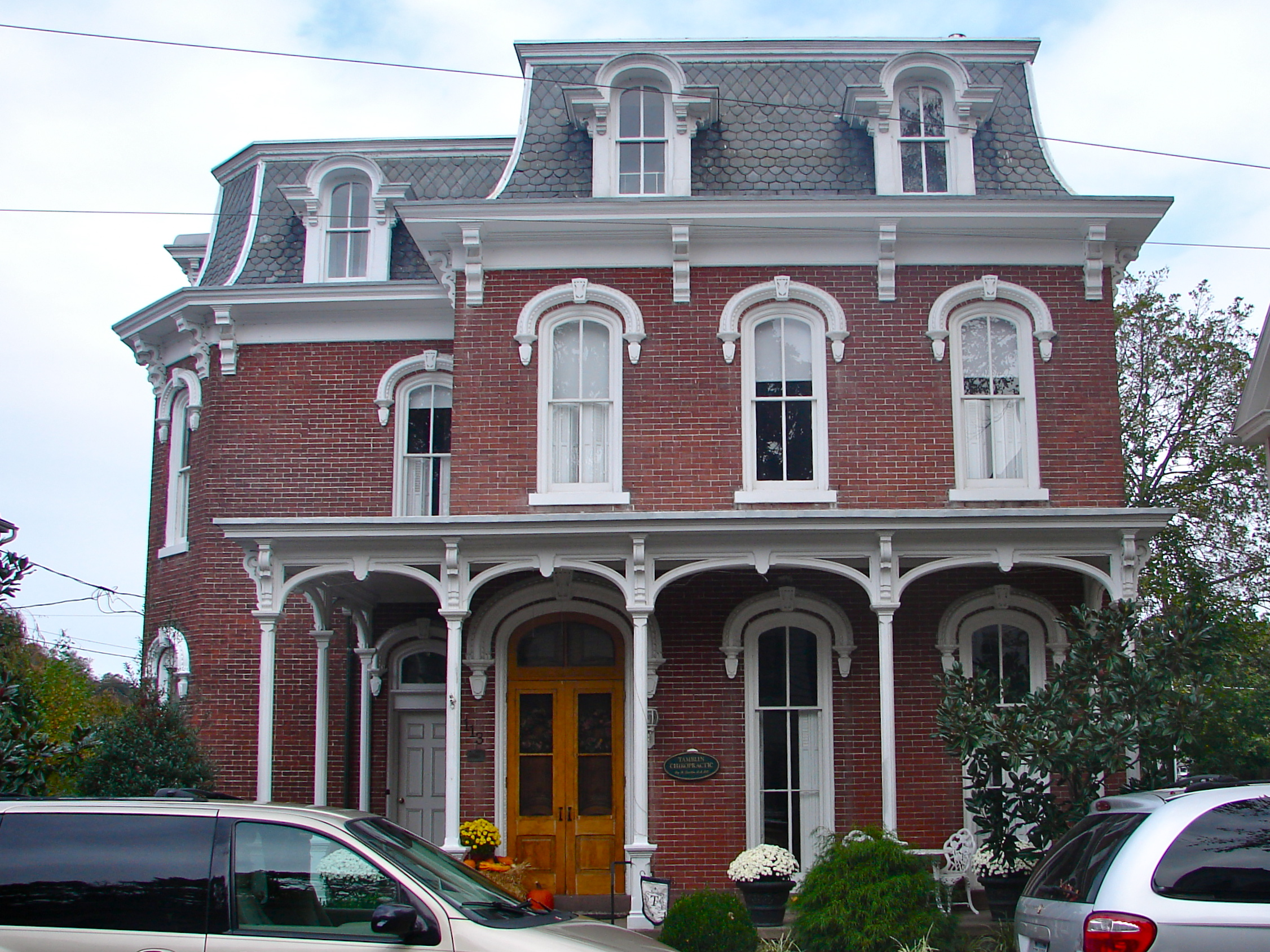
- House in the Danville West Market Street Historic District, October 2011

- Location within Pennsylvania Location within the United States
- Location: Bounded by Courthouse Alley E., Front St S., Haney's Alley W. and Mahoning St. N., Danville, Pennsylvania
- Coordinates: 40°57′46″N 76°37′29″W
- Area: 11.2 acres (4.5 ha)
- Built: 1800
- Architectural style: Late 19th And 20th Century Revivals, Early Republic, Late Victorian
- NRHP reference No.: 85001174
- Added to NRHP: May 29, 1985

Danville West Market Street Historic District is a national historic district located in Danville, Montour County, Pennsylvania. It encompasses 42 contributing buildings in a residential area of Danville. The buildings date from about 1800 to 1925. The houses are mostly of brick and frame construction, with some log and stone dwellings, and in a variety of architectural styles including Italianate, Federal, Queen Anne and Second Empire.

It was added to the National Register of Historic Places in 1985. In 1994, it was incorporated into the Danville Historic District.
