= Hanover Township, Luzerne County, Pennsylvania =

Township in Pennsylvania, US

Coordinates: 41°12′00″N 75°52′28″W

- Township
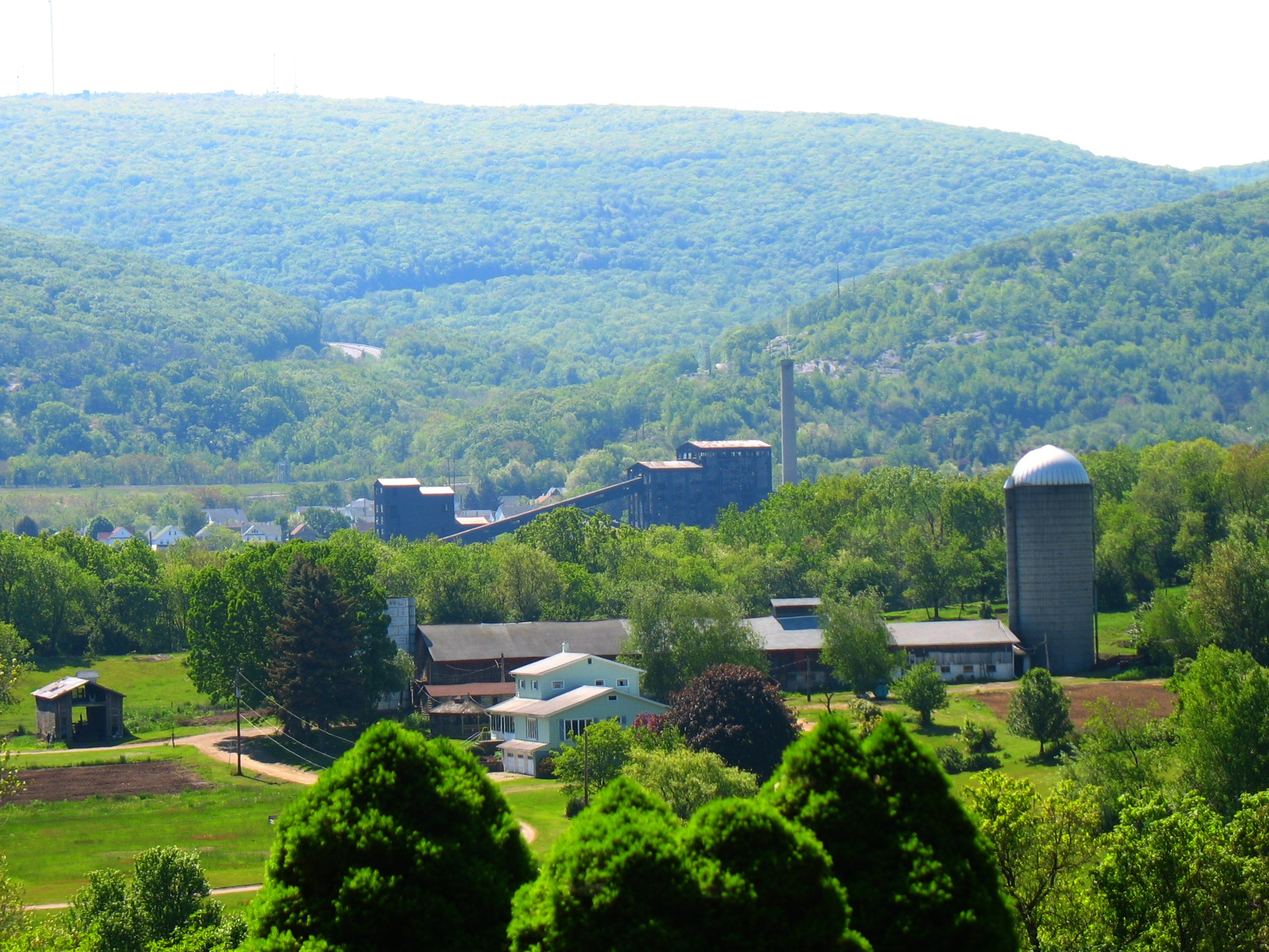
- Huber Breaker in Ashley Borough, as viewed from a farm in Hanover Township
- Motto: "A progressive growing community"
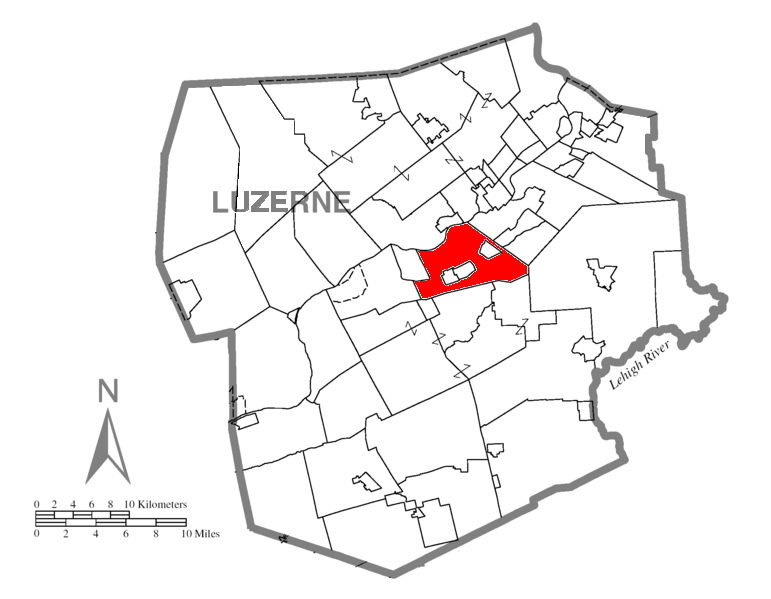
- Map of Luzerne County highlighting Hanover Township

- Map of Pennsylvania highlighting Luzerne County
- Country: United States
- State: Pennsylvania
- County: Luzerne
- Settled: 1772
- Incorporated: 1790

Area
  - Total: 19.22 sq mi (49.77 km^{2})
  - Land: 18.86 sq mi (48.86 km^{2})
  - Water: 0.35 sq mi (0.90 km^{2})

Population (2020)
  - Total: 11,424 ▲
  - Estimate (2021): 11,418
  - Density: 575.6/sq mi (222.25/km^{2})
- Time zone: UTC-5 (Eastern (EST))
  - Summer (DST): UTC-4 (EDT)
- ZIP codes: 18634, mostly 18706
- Area codes: 570 & 272
- FIPS code: 42-079-32416
- Website: hanovertownship.org

Hanover Township is a township in Luzerne County, Pennsylvania. As of the 2020 census, the population was 11,424, making it the most populous township in the county.

== History ==
A 19th century map of Hanover Township

Hanover Township was one of the original townships laid out by the Susquehanna Company of Connecticut. Captain Lazarus Stewart and dozens of his followers moved from Lancaster County into the Wyoming Valley in 1770; they fought for Connecticut in the Yankee-Pennamite Wars. For their service to Connecticut, Captain Stewart and his followers were granted a tract of land which became Hanover Township. The community was named after Lazarus Stewart's hometown of Hanover in Dauphin County, Pennsylvania. In the early 1770s, Captain Lazarus Stewart built the first house in the Breslau section of the township (between Solomon Creek and the Susquehanna River).

Native American raids were very common in the Wyoming Valley in the 18th century. On July 3, 1778, Loyalist and Iroquois forces routed the Patriot militia at the Battle of Wyoming in present-day Exeter. Over two dozen Hanover Township residents were killed in the fight.

The original township occupied all the land from Wilkes-Barre to Newport Township, and all the land between the Susquehanna River and the Lehigh River. In the 19th century, the original township downsized when sections of it broke away to form new municipalities, including townships, boroughs, and cities.

In the following decades, coal mining became the major industry in and around Hanover Township. Coal breakers were constructed throughout the region. One, in particular, was built in modern-day Ashley; it was known as the Huber Breaker.

Following the collapse of the mining industry in Wyoming Valley, the breaker was demolished in 2014. Ashley Planes, a historic freight cable railroad in Hanover and Fairview Townships, was listed on the National Register of Historic Places in 1980.

== Geography ==
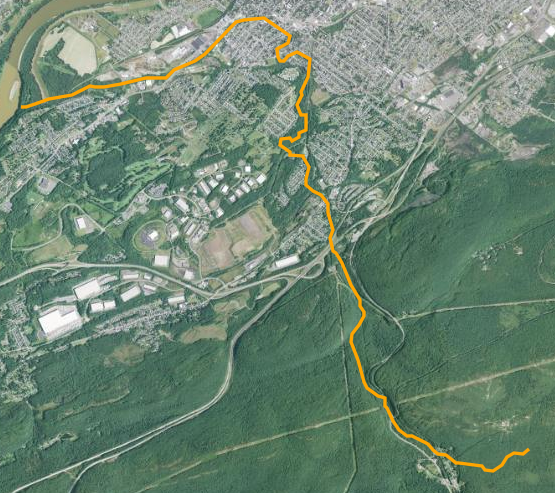
A satellite map of Solomon Creek flowing through Hanover Township.

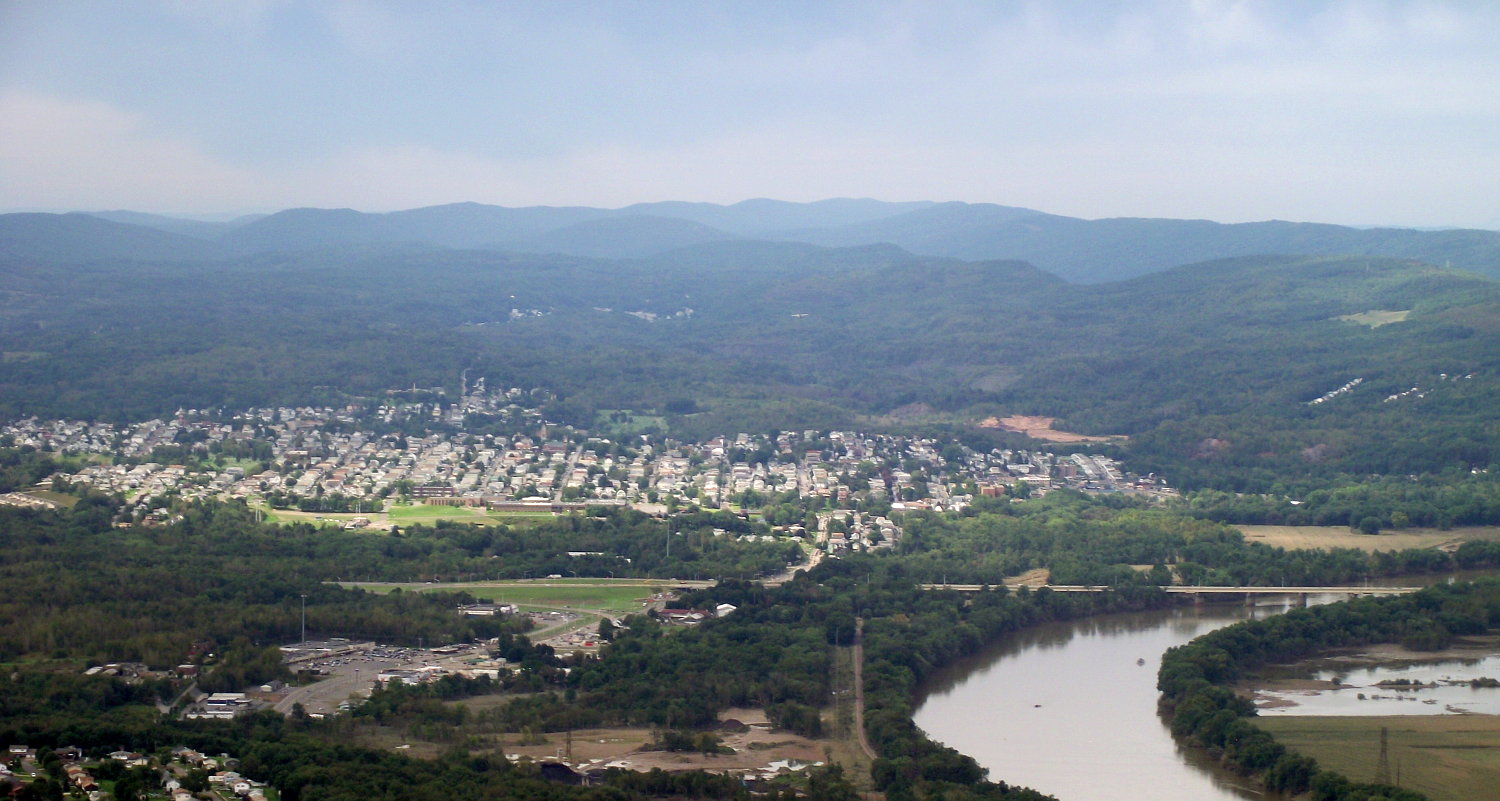
Hanover Township (in foreground) borders Nanticoke City (middle); the South Cross Valley Expressway (PA 29) crosses over the Susquehanna River and links Hanover Township to Plymouth Township (on right).

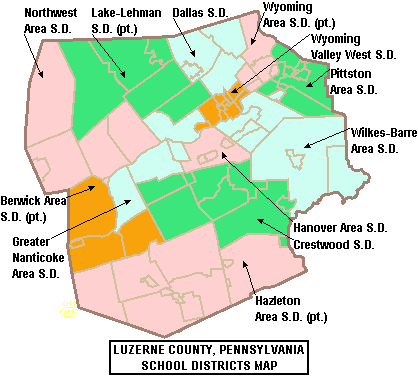
Hanover Area School District in Luzerne County

According to the United States Census Bureau, the township has a total area of 19.2 square miles (49.8 km^{2}), of which 18.9 square miles (48.9 km^{2}) is land and 0.35 square miles (0.9 km^{2}), or 1.82%, is water. The Susquehanna River drains the municipality and separates it from Larksville Borough, Plymouth Borough, and Plymouth Township. The north side of the township — near the river — is mainly low-lying (500 to 650 ft or 150 to 200 m above sea level); most of the township's homes and businesses reside in the northern and central portions of the township. The southern portion of the municipality is mountainous, rising to 2,148 feet (655 m) at the summit of Haystack Mountain on the southeast border. The township lies directly between the cities of Wilkes-Barre and Nanticoke.

The main thoroughfares in Hanover Township are the South Cross Valley Expressway (PA 29), the four-lane Sans Souci Parkway (locally pronounced "San Suey"), and the two-lane South Main Street. The former connects I-81 in the southeast with U.S. 11 in West Nanticoke which connects Wilkes-Barre and Nanticoke.

I-81 and PA 309 provide access to Hazleton, Wilkes-Barre Township, and Scranton. In the northern portion of the community, the Carey Ave Bridge, also known as the 1st Battalion, 109th Field Artillery Pennsylvania Army National Guard Bridge. crosses the Susquehanna River, linking Hanover Township to Plymouth and Larksville.

Hanover's 12 villages are Askam, Breslau, Buttonwood, Dundee, Hanover Green, Iona, Korn Krest, Lee Park, Lower Askam, Lyndwood, Newtown, and Preston. The township is part of Hanover Area School District, which is located in central Luzerne County.

=== Neighboring municipalities ===
- Wilkes-Barre (northeast)
- Larksville (north)
- Plymouth (north)
- Plymouth Township (northwest)
- Nanticoke (west)
- Newport Township (southwest)
- Nuangola (southwest)
- Rice Township (south)
- Fairview Township (southeast)
- Bear Creek Township (southeast)
- Laurel Run (east)
- Wilkes-Barre Township (east)

Three boroughs, Ashley, Sugar Notch, and Warrior Run, are surrounded by Hanover Township.

=== Climate ===
The township has a humid continental climate (Dfa/Dfb) and the hardiness zone is 6a except in Dundee, where it is 6b. Average monthly temperatures in Askam range from 26.3 °F in January to 71.8 °F in July.

== Government ==
Hanover Township is governed by a board of seven commissioners. The following is a list of current board members:

- George L. Andrejko, vice-chairman
- Albert J. Bagusky
- George W. Bowers
- Russell P. Davis, chairman
- William L. Howatt
- Ronald Krushnowski
- Jeffrey P. Lewis

== Demographics ==
Historical population
Census	Pop.	Note	%±
1970	12,102		—
1980	12,601		4.1%
1990	12,050		−4.4%
2000	11,488		−4.7%
2010	11,076		−3.6%
2020	11,424		3.1%
2021 (est.)	11,418		−0.1%

As of the census of 2000, there were 11,488 people, 4,951 households, and 3,153 families residing in the township. The population density was 610.5 inhabitants per square mile (235.7/km^{2}). There were 5,338 housing units at an average density of 283.7 per square mile (109.5/km^{2}). The racial makeup of the township was 98.08% White, 0.96% African American, 0.02% Native American, 0.17% Asian, 0.12% from other races, and 0.64% from two or more races. Hispanic or Latino of any race were 0.60% of the population.

There were 4,951 households, out of which 27.2% had children under the age of 18 living with them, 44.6% were married couples living together, 14.6% had a female householder with no husband present, and 36.3% were non-families. 32.4% of all households were made up of individuals, and 17.4% had someone living alone who was 65 years of age or older. The average household size was 2.29, and the average family size was 2.90.

In the township the population was spread out, with 22.0% under the age of 18, 7.9% from 18 to 24, 26.5% from 25 to 44, 23.0% from 45 to 64, and 20.7% who were 65 years of age or older. The median age was 40 years. For every 100 females, there were 86.2 males. For every 100 females age 18 and over, there were 82.1 males.

The median income for a household in the township was $30,043, and the median income for a family was $37,883. Males had a median income of $29,679, versus $21,691 for females. The per capita income for the township was $16,181. About 12.2% of families and 15.3% of the population were below the poverty line, including 23.0% of those under age 18 and 13.9% of those age 65 or over.

== Transportation ==
Hanover Township is served by the Luzerne County Transportation Authority. The bus routes include:

- Route 13 (Wilkes-Barre, Ashley, and Sugar Notch)
- Routes 14 and 15 (Wilkes-Barre and Nanticoke)
- Route 22 (Wilkes-Barre and Plymouth)

== Gallery ==
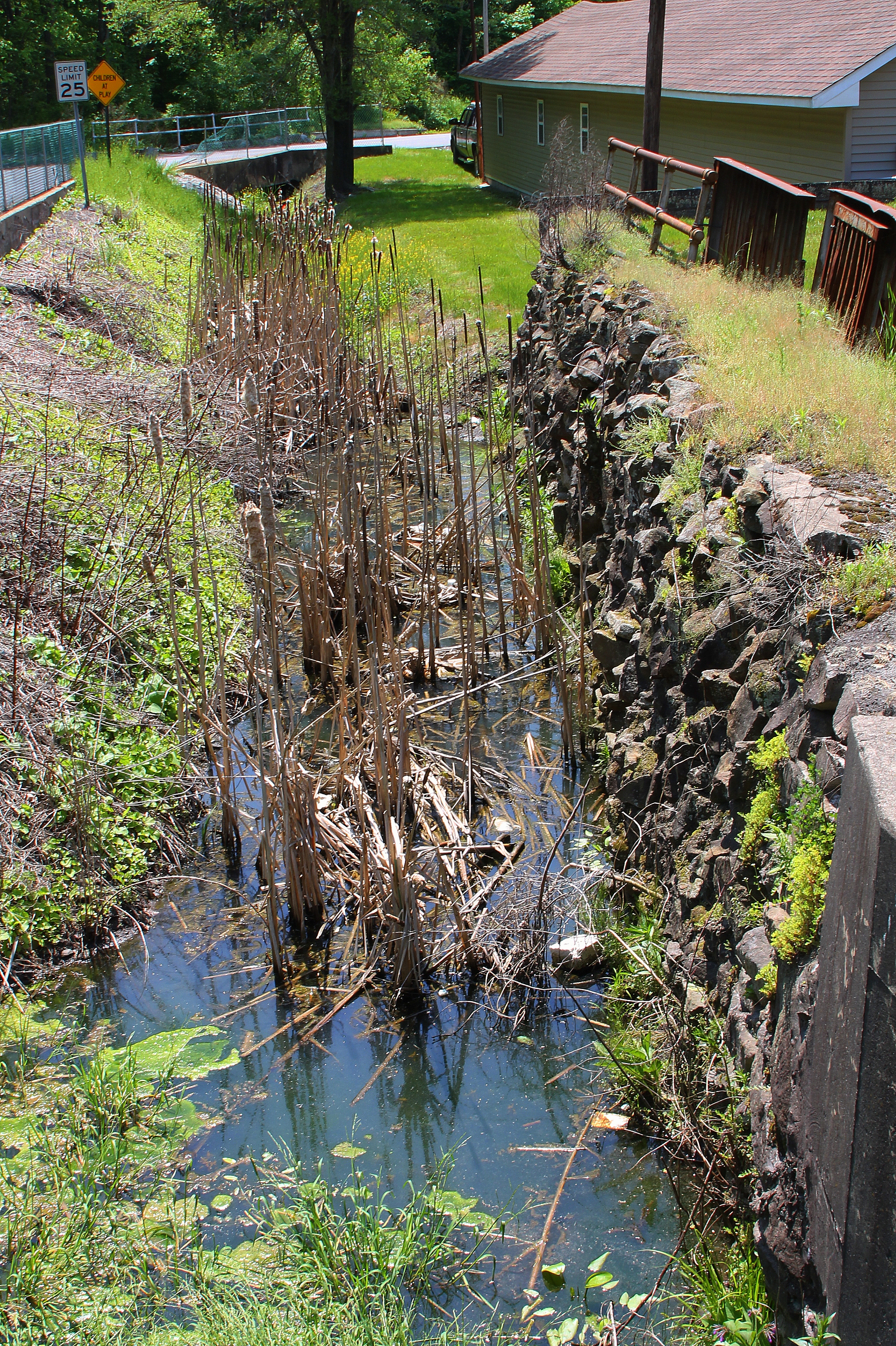
Warrior Creek, Hanover Township

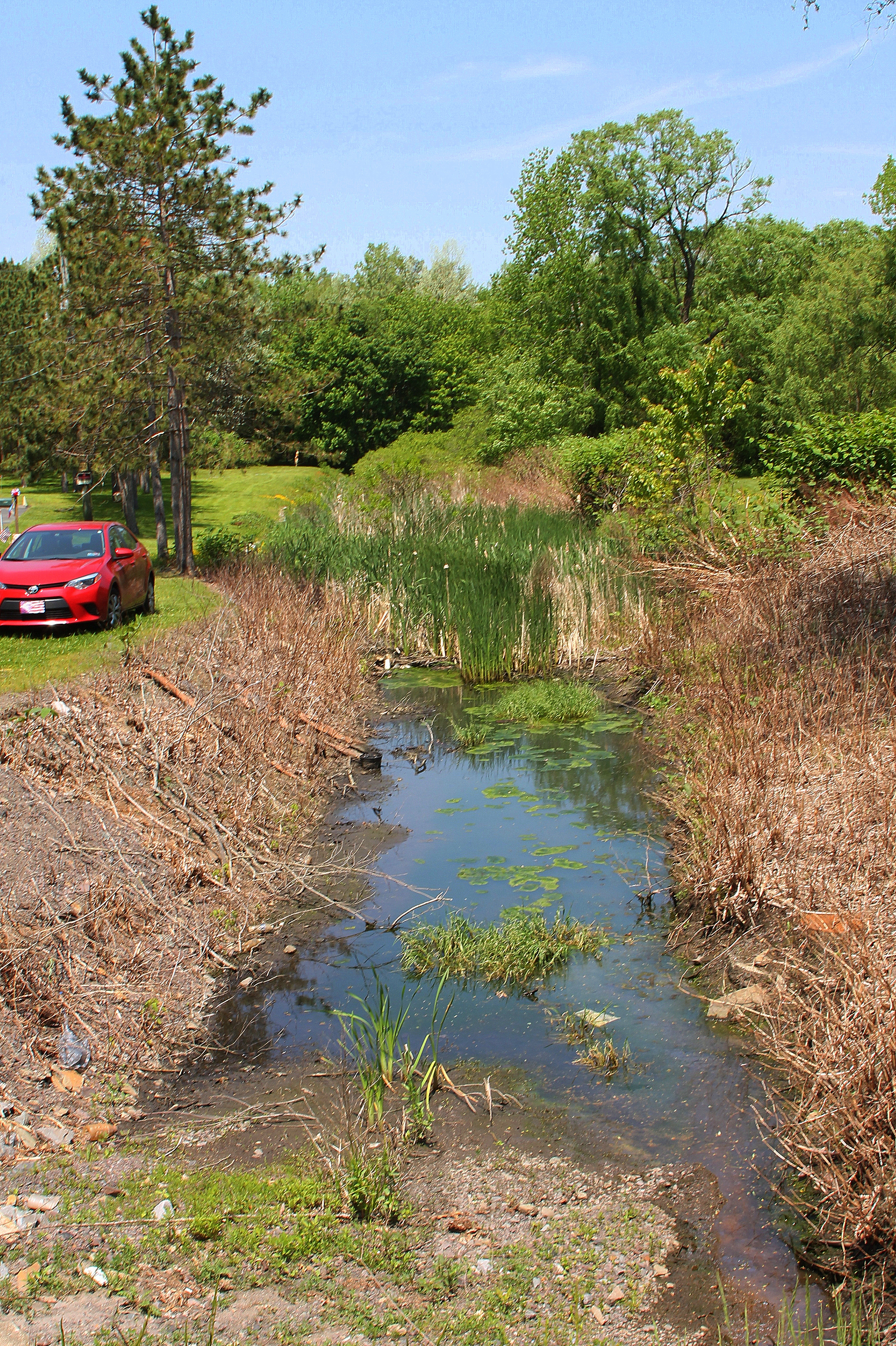
Warrior Creek, Hanover Township

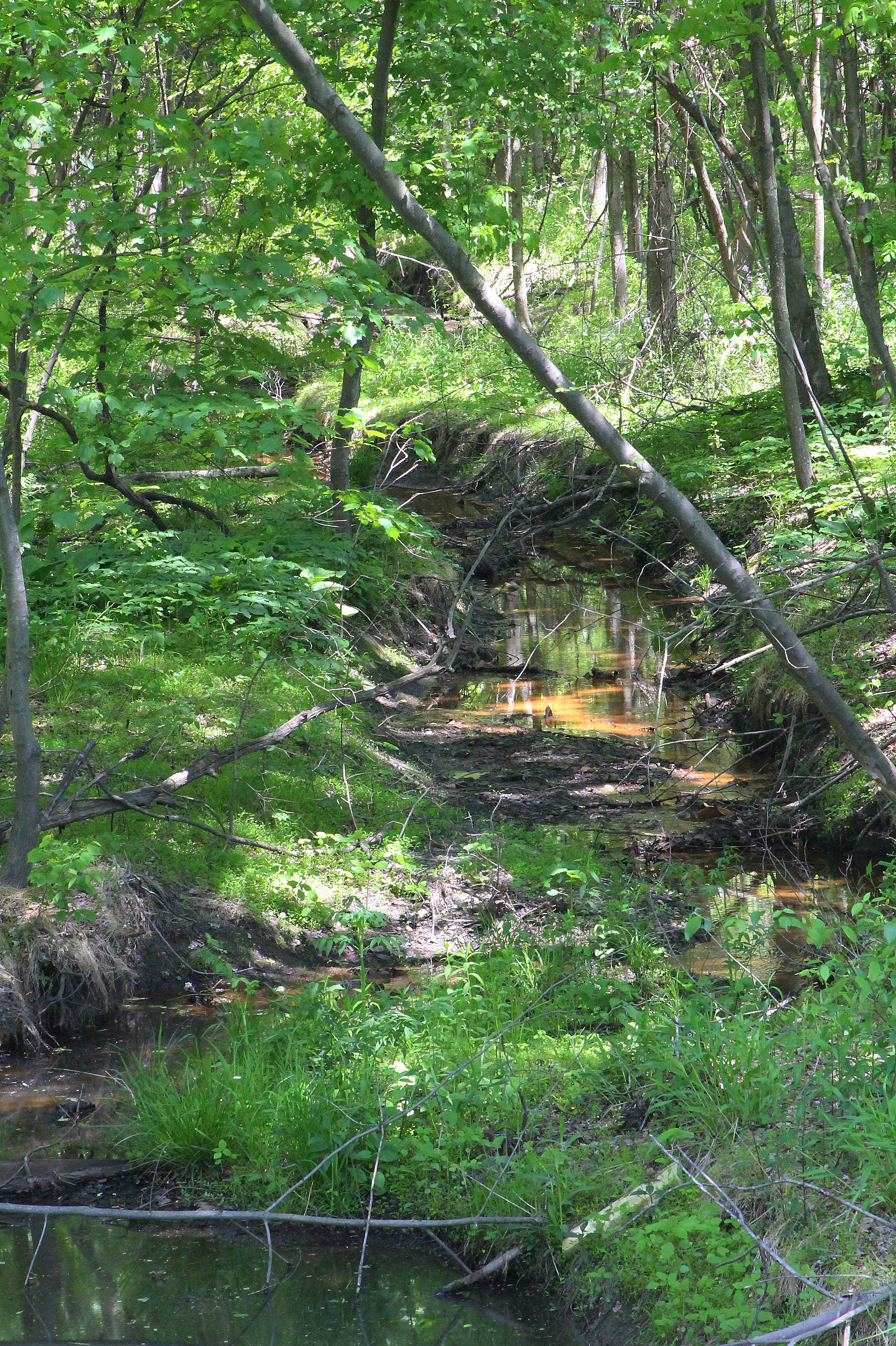
Nanticoke Creek, Hanover Township
