= 1890 Wilkes-Barre tornado =

Historical natural disaster

Meteorological history
- Formed: West of Nanticoke (approximately 5 pm on August 19, 1890)
- Dissipated: East of Wilkes-Barre (approximately a little after 5:30 pm on August 19, 1890)
- Duration: approx. 29 minutes

F3 tornado
- on the Fujita scale

Overall effects
- Fatalities: 16
- Injuries: 50
- Damage: Damaged or destroyed 260 buildings; it cost at least $240,000 (1890 USD)
- Areas affected: Wilkes-Barre, Luzerne County, Pennsylvania

The 1890 Wilkes-Barre tornado was a deadly tornado that occurred on Tuesday, August 19, 1890, in Wilkes-Barre, Luzerne County, Pennsylvania. It tore through the city as an estimated F3. The tornado killed 16 people, injured 50, damaged or destroyed 260 buildings, and cost at least $240,000 (in 1890 money). It was one of the deadliest tornadoes in Pennsylvania history.

== Events of August 19, 1890 ==
=== Touchdown ===
It's believed that on the afternoon of August 19, 1890, the tornado touched down west of Nanticoke as an estimated F0. According to Professor Thomas Santee, "A brisk gust of wind passed through Nanticoke and the dust and light articles rose in a whirlwind, while a large maple tree was blown down at the east end of the Nanticoke Bridge." The tornado then traveled eastward into Hanover Township (along the bank of the Susquehanna River).

"Following the bank of the river which is in a direction nearly east, for a short distance the trees are marked by the characteristic twisting off of branches and further on the field was strewn with light debris consisting of bark of trees and small bits of wood which had been carried by the storm."

"Then for about a mile there is no distinct trace of the storm but from Butzbach's Landing, the effects become clearer, abundant and characteristic, leading past the north side of the cemetery at Hanover Green."

=== Striking Wilkes-Barre ===
The storm then veered north and entered South Wilkes-Barre at about 5:20 pm. In 1890, nearly 38,000 people lived in the city. The tornado intensified to an F3 as it moved deeper into the municipality. It struck Main Street and swept northward to Wood Street. The tornado then widened and walloped Franklin Street. The tornado may have been 300 yards wide at that point. The storm continued to tear through the municipality (mostly in the industrial section). Eventually the tornado worked its way out of the city. By 5:31 pm, it ended in a heavily wooded area just east of Wilkes-Barre.

“Hundreds of houses were unroofed, partially blown over and completely demolished” stated one dispatch. Passenger trains and locomotives were blown over. Brick buildings either had their upper stories torn away or were completely leveled. The tornado killed 16 people, injured 50, damaged or destroyed 260 buildings, and cost at least $240,000 (in 1890 money).

== Other deadly tornadoes in and around Wilkes-Barre ==
- In August 1914, an estimated F3 tornado killed roughly six people and injured sixty others in Wilkes-Barre Township and the Heights Section of Wilkes-Barre City. The twister toppled church steeples and destroyed many homes. Four of the six fatalities were female employees of the Laurel Silk Mill near Empire Street. They were killed when the storm toppled the mill's brick walls.
- In January 1917, a tornado struck Georgetown in Wilkes-Barre Township. Roofs, chimneys, porches, and fences were swept away. An estimated three people were killed in the storm.

== See also ==
- List of North American tornadoes and tornado outbreaks
