= Korn Krest, Pennsylvania =

Village in Pennsylvania, U.S.

Coordinates: 41°13′05″N 75°56′38″W

Korn Krest is a village in Hanover Township, Luzerne County, Pennsylvania. It is located in the Wyoming Valley between Wilkes-Barre and Nanticoke on the south side of the Sans Souci Parkway, which is a main thoroughfare connecting the two cities and is locally pronounced "San Suey." Hanover Township Area Jr/Sr High School is located in Korn Krest on the former site of Sans Souci Park, an amusement park that closed in 1970 and was first named Hanover Park from 1893 to 1905. The village uses the Wilkes-Barre/Hanover Township zip code of 18706.
