= WSFX =

WSFX may refer to:

- WSFX-TV, a television station (channel 29, virtual 26) licensed to Wilmington, North Carolina, United States
- WSFX (FM), a radio station (89.1 FM) licensed to Nanticoke, Pennsylvania, United States
