= Breslau, Pennsylvania =

Unincorporated community in Pennsylvania, US

Coordinates: 41°14′00″N 75°56′05″W

Breslau is an unincorporated community in Hanover Township, Luzerne County, Pennsylvania, located along the south side of the Susquehanna River. It was given the German name of the Polish city of Wrocław. The village uses the Wilkes-Barre/Hanover Township zip code of 18706.
