= Cross Valley Expressway =

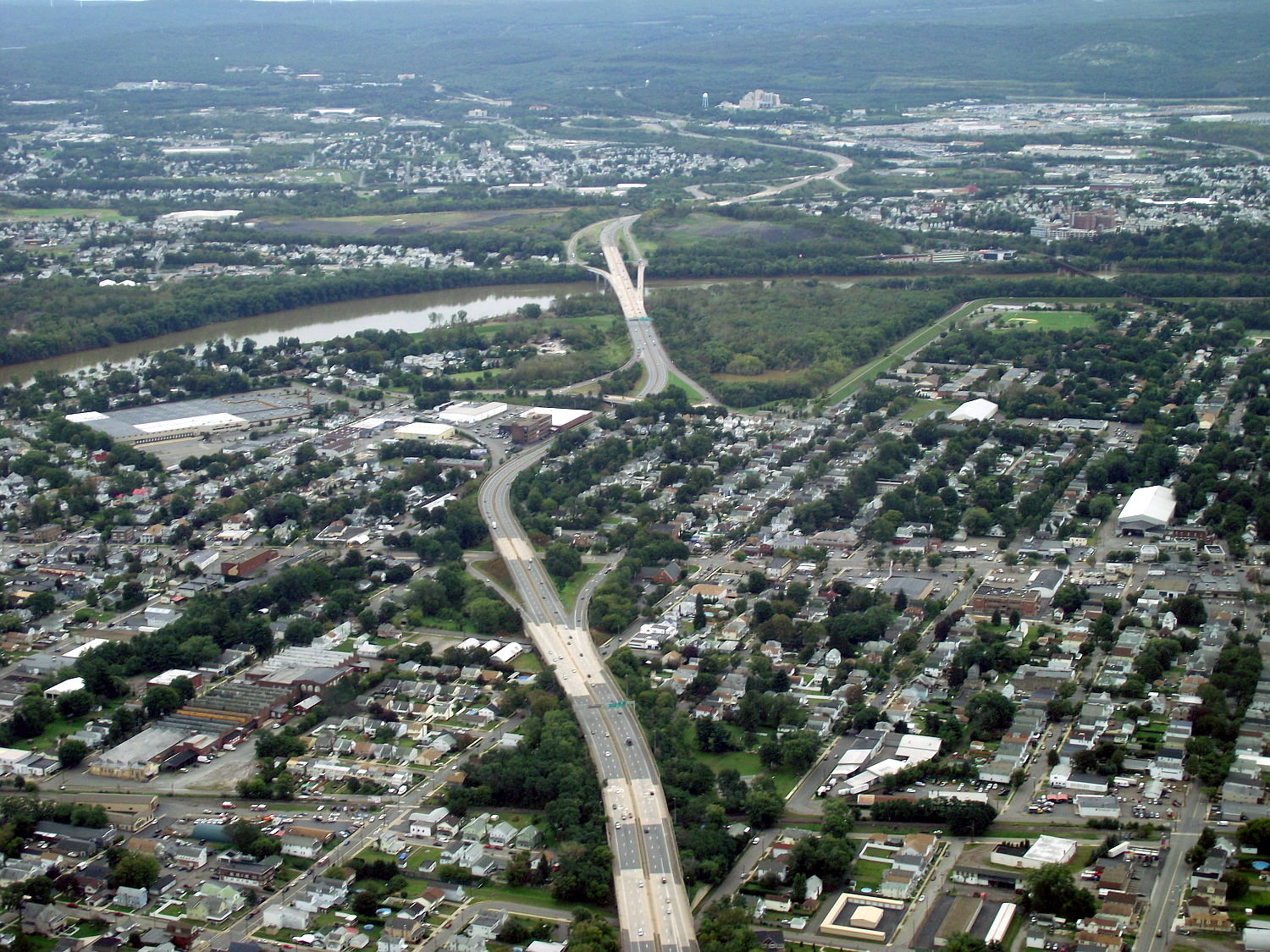
North Cross Valley Expressway at Kingston and Wilkes-Barre

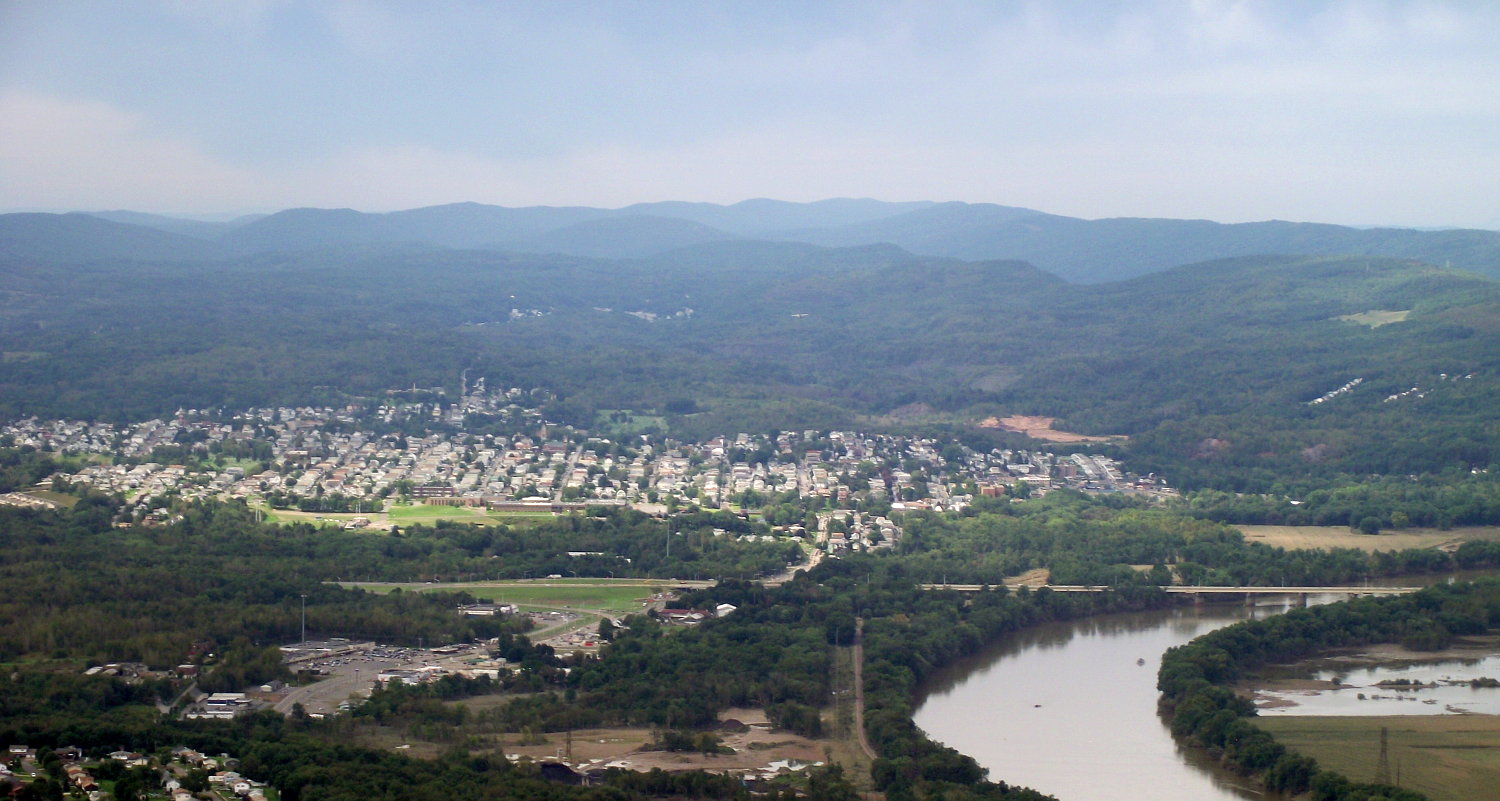
South Cross Valley Expressway crossing the Susquehanna River at Nanticoke

The Cross Valley Expressway is a pair of freeways in the Wilkes-Barre, Pennsylvania area that span the width of the Wyoming Valley. The pair, designated as North and South, are two distinctly separate freeways, yet share the same name due to their like function and their proximity to each other. Both freeways cross the Susquehanna River while traversing the Valley.

Therefore, Cross Valley Expressway may refer to:

- North Cross Valley Expressway, a freeway in Wilkes-Barre, Pennsylvania, that is part of Pennsylvania Route 309
- South Cross Valley Expressway, a freeway south of Wilkes-Barre, Pennsylvania, that is part of Pennsylvania Route 29
