= Warrior Run, Pennsylvania =

Borough in Pennsylvania, US

- Borough
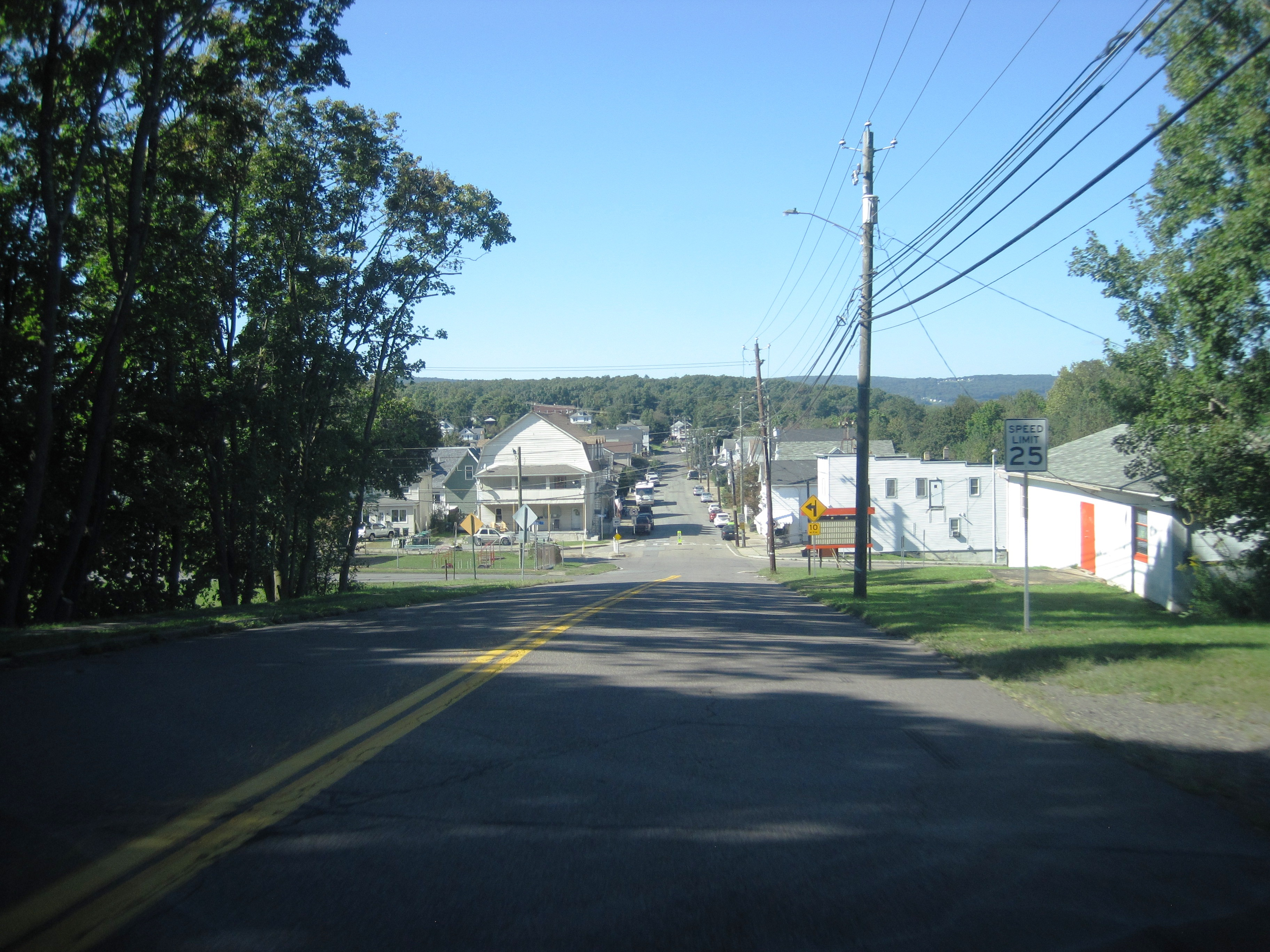
- Northbound Front Street in Warrior Run, Luzerne County

- Location of Warrior Run in Luzerne County, Pennsylvania.

- Location within Pennsylvania Location within the United States
- Coordinates: 41°11′15″N 75°57′09″W
- Country: United States
- State: Pennsylvania
- County: Luzerne
- Incorporated: 1895

Government
  - Type: Borough Council
  - Mayor: Tom Shypulefski

Area
  - Total: 0.66 sq mi (1.71 km^{2})
  - Land: 0.66 sq mi (1.71 km^{2})
  - Water: 0 sq mi (0.00 km^{2})
- Elevation: 665 ft (203 m)

Population (2020)
  - Total: 528 ▼
  - Estimate (2021): 529
  - Density: 880/sq mi (339.7/km^{2})
- Time zone: UTC-5 (Eastern (EST))
  - Summer (DST): UTC-4 (EDT)
- Zip code: 18706
- Area code: 570
- FIPS code: 42-81080
- Website: www.wrboro.org

Warrior Run is a borough in Luzerne County, Pennsylvania, United States. The population was 528 at the time of the 2020 census.

== History ==
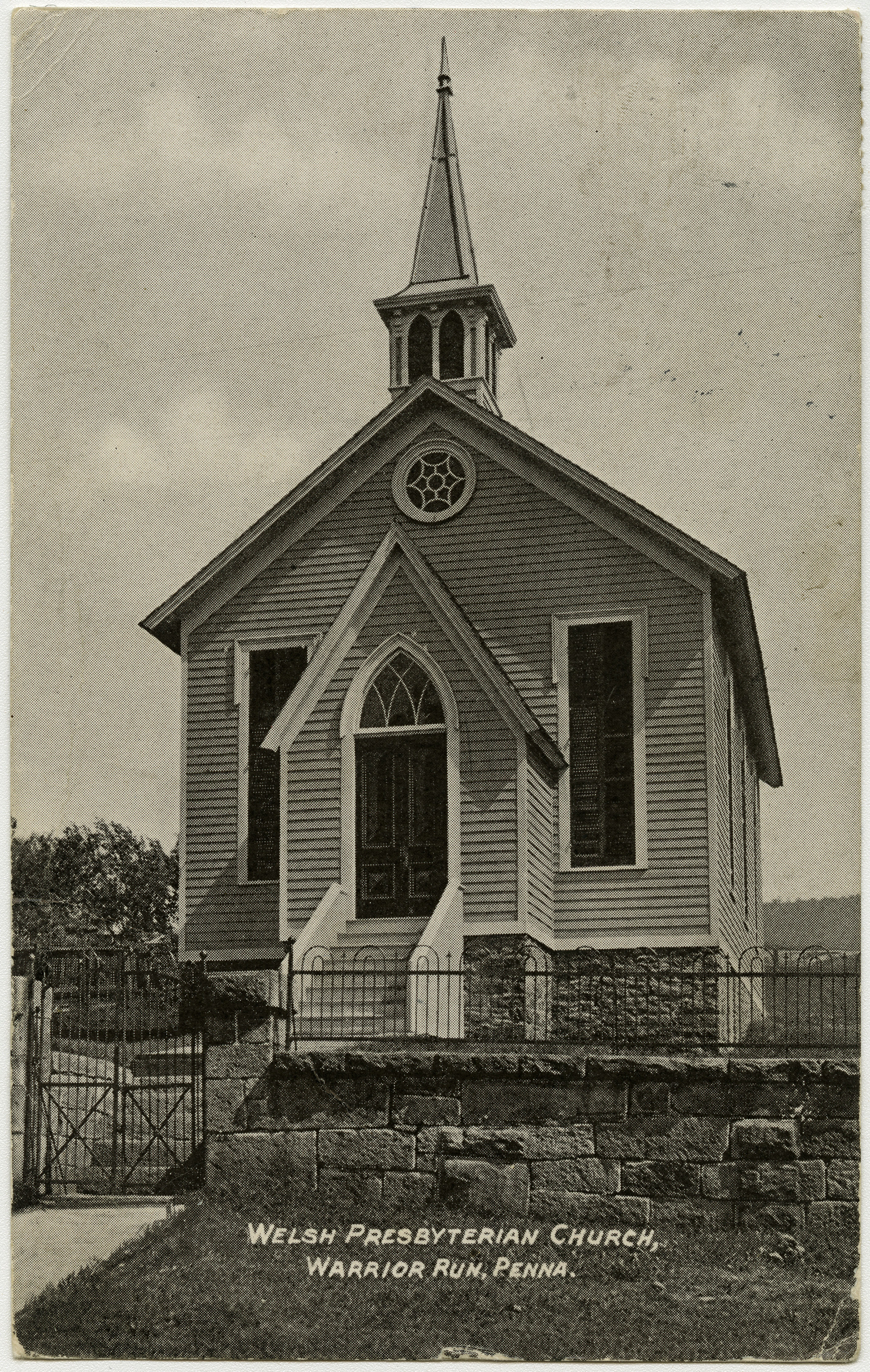
A Welsh Presbyterian Church in Warrior Run

=== Early history ===
The first settlers of Warrior Run were Connecticut natives Elisha and Anna Blackman and their young children, Henry and Ebenezer. In 1791, they cleared trees and built a log cabin. For many years after, their land was the only cleared area beyond the Middle Road.

=== Coal mining ===
Coal mining was the chief industry in the region. In 1864, the Warrior Run Mining Company was organized; it reopened the old Holland and Hillman mine. The company built a breaker at the foot of the mountain; it opened in 1867.

At about the same time, both the Lehigh Valley Railroad and the Nanticoke Branch of the Central Railroad of New Jersey completed their lines through the area, thus making it possible to conveniently mine, transport, and market the area's coal. The occupations of the majority of residents were directly associated to mining in some way.

Ultimately, in the 20th century, the coal industry in the region died out.

=== Borough ===
Warrior Run Mining Village arose on the land owned by the Warrior Run Mining Company. On January 25, 1895, the Borough of Warrior Run was incorporated. Charles Williams was elected the first burgess on February 19.

A lot on Hanover Street was selected for the borough's first town hall.

The borough celebrated its 100th anniversary in 1995.

== Geography ==
Warrior Run is located at 41°11′15″N 75°57′9″W (41.187463, -75.952584) — just southeast of Nanticoke.

According to the United States Census Bureau, the borough has a total area of 0.73 square miles (1.9 km^{2}), all of it land.

It is located on a historical battleground and on mostly fertile soil. The northern and western sections of the community consist mostly of homes and businesses; the southern and eastern areas of the borough are predominantly woodland.

== Demographics ==
Historical population
Census	Pop.	Note	%±
1900	965		—
1910	1,251		29.6%
1920	1,387		10.9%
1930	1,516		9.3%
1940	1,339		−11.7%
1950	1,056		−21.1%
1960	833		−21.1%
1970	816		−2.0%
1980	784		−3.9%
1990	656		−16.3%
2000	624		−4.9%
2010	584		−6.4%
2020	527		−9.8%
2021 (est.)	529	▲	0.4%

As of the census of 2000, there were 624 people, 257 households, and 178 families living in the borough.

The population density was 806.2 inhabitants per square mile (311.3/km^{2}). There were 285 housing units at an average density of 368.2 per square mile (142.2/km^{2}).

The racial makeup of the borough was 98.88% White, 0.32% African American, 0.16% Asian, and 0.64% from two or more races. Hispanic or Latino of any race were 0.80% of the population.

There were 257 households, out of which 26.5% had children under the age of eighteen living with them; 51.0% were married couples living together, 16.0% had a female householder with no husband present, and 30.7% were non-families. 25.7% of all households were made up of individuals, and 13.6% had someone living alone who was sixty-five years of age or older.

The average household size was 2.43 and the average family size was 2.94.

In the borough the population was spread out, with 22.6% under the age of eighteen, 6.1% from eighteen to twenty-four, 28.5% from twenty-five to forty-four, 24.7% from forty-five to sixty-four, and 18.1% who were sixty-five years of age or older. The median age was forty years.

For every one hundred females there were 86.3 males. For every one hundred females who were aged eighteen and older, there were 82.3 males.

The median income for a household in the borough was $29,583, and the median income for a family was $36,250. Males had a median income of $28,958 compared with that of $21,304 for females.

The per capita income for the borough was $15,693.

Roughly 10.0% of families and 9.1% of the population were living below the poverty line, including 12.2% of those who were under the age of eighteen and 9.8% of those who were aged sixty-five or over.

== Education ==
It is in the Hanover Area School District.
