= WVHO-LP =

- Nanticoke, Pennsylvania; United States
- Frequency: 94.5 MHz
- Branding: "Hope Radio"

Programming
- Format: Christian rock

Ownership
- Owner: St. John's Evangelical Lutheran Church

History
- Call sign meaning: "Hope"

Technical information
- Licensing authority: FCC
- Facility ID: 133888
- Class: L1
- ERP: 100 watts
- HAAT: −141.0 meters (−462.6 ft)
- Transmitter coordinates: 41°12′17.00″N 76°0′0.00″W

Links
- Public license information: LMS
- Website: WVHO-LP Online

WVHO-LP (94.5 FM, "Hope Radio") is a radio station broadcasting a Christian rock music format. Licensed to Nanticoke, Pennsylvania, United States, the station is currently owned by St. John's Evangelical Lutheran Church.
