= Thomas Chrostwaite =

American lawyer (1873–1958)

Thomas Francis Chrostwaite (1873–1958, USA) was a prominent figure in municipal governance and education in Pennsylvania. Born in Ashley Borough, Pennsylvania, Chrostwaite was an attorney who was known for his efforts to improve local government administration. In 1911, he founded the Pennsylvania State Association of Boroughs (PSAB).

Chrostwaite graduated from Harvard University in 1898. Following his time at Harvard, he returned to Pennsylvania, where he worked as a school administrator in Luzerne County, Pennsylvania.

== Career ==
In 1905, after graduating from Harvard, Chrostwaite was admitted to the Pennsylvania Bar and opened a law office in York County where he worked as municipal solicitor for Hanover Borough. Chrostwaite was interested in community organization, municipal law, and the history of local governments. He traveled around Pennsylvania and internationally to study local governmental systems and their responsiveness to citizens. His extensive experiences were instrumental in establishing the Pennsylvania State Association of Boroughs. Later, he served as school administrator in Luzerne County, Pennsylvania.

== Pennsylvania State Association of Boroughs ==
Chrostwaite retired as President of PSAB in 1957 at the age of 84. To memorialize his contributions, PSAB created the Chrostwaite Institute.
