= WSFX (FM) =

- Nanticoke, Pennsylvania; United States
- Frequency: 89.1 MHz
- Branding: The Cutting Edge

Programming
- Format: Alternative

Ownership
- Owner: Luzerne County Community College

History
- First air date: 1985

Technical information
- Licensing authority: FCC
- Facility ID: 39261
- Class: A
- ERP: 100 watts
- HAAT: −116.0 meters (−380.6 ft)
- Transmitter coordinates: 41°11′42″N 75°59′28″W
- Repeater: 105.5 W288BE (Wilkes-Barre)

Links
- Public license information: Public file; LMS
- Webcast: Listen live
- Website: depts.luzerne.edu/wsfx/

WSFX (89.1 FM, "The Cutting Edge") is a radio station broadcasting an alternative music format. Licensed to Nanticoke, Pennsylvania, United States, the station is owned by Luzerne County Community College.
