= Hanover Area School District =

School district in Pennsylvania

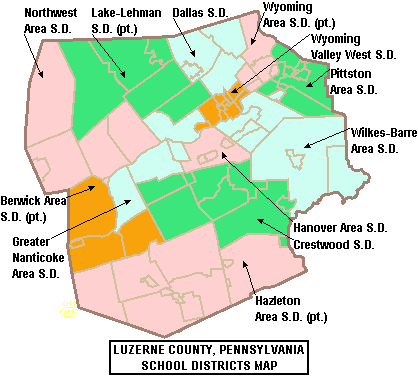
- Location of Hanover Area School District in Luzerne County, Pennsylvania

Address
- 1600 Sans Souci Parkway Hanover Township, Pennsylvania, 18706; United States

District information
- Type: Public

Students and staff
- Colors: Blue and White

Other information
- Website: http://www.hanoverarea.org/

The Hanover Area School District is a midsized, public school district located in Wyoming Valley, comprises Hanover Township and the boroughs of Warrior Run, Sugar Notch, and Ashley in Pennsylvania. Hanover Area School District encompasses approximately 30 square miles (78 km^{2}). According to 2000 federal census data, it serves a resident population of 19,048. In 2009, the district residents' Per Capita Income was reported as $16,412 while the Median Family Income was $37,692.

The district operates: a Junior/Senior High School (grades 7–12), Memorial Elementary (grades 5,6), Lee Park Elementary Center (grades 2,3,4), and Hanover Green Elementary Center (Kindergarten,1, 2).

== Extracurricular Activities ==
At Hanover Area School District there are two levels Junior Varsity for 7th and 8th graders and Varsity for 9th-12th grade. A student is only allowed to compete on a varsity level for four years of their academic career. Some fall sports include: Cheerleading, Boys and Girls Cross Country, Girls Tennis, Girls Field Hockey, Boys Soccer, Girls Volleyball and Boys Football. The Spring Sports provided include: Boys and Girls Swimming and Diving, Boys and Girls Track and Field, Girls Soccer, Boys Volleyball, Girls and Boys Basketball, Boys Wrestling, Girls Softball, Boys Baseball.

=== Academic competition ===
Students are encouraged to enter various local, state, and national competitions. Hanover Area students have demonstrated their accomplishments in the Pennsylvania Junior Academy of Science (PJAS), the Voice of Democracy Contest, National History Day, Mock Trial, Youth Salute, Future Business Leaders of America (FBLA), and most recently, the Marching Band captured the title of Atlantic Coast Champions for 1993, 1995 and 1996.

=== Clubs ===
There are various after-school clubs that meet during the week.

- Key Club
- Leo Club
- Junior (7th-9th) and Senior (10th-12th) Honor Society
- Drama Club
- Yearbook (9th-12th)
- Student Council (9th-12th) and Junior Student Council (7th-8th)
- Fusion and Concert Band
- Junior (7th-8th) and Senior Chorus (9th-12th)
- Art Club
- Mock Trial
- Business Club/FBLA (9th-12th)
- Power Lifting Club

The musically oriented groups put on several shows a year. Two of the most popular are the Christmas Concert (generally taking place in late December) and the Spring Concert (late April/early May). Fusion, additionally, performs at all of the football games as a more "rock and roll" alternative to the traditional marching band. Due to the sedentary nature of such instruments as drums and keyboards, they do not actually march, though they do also include clarinets, saxophones, and trumpets.

Drama Club puts on plays that are often popular with the student body because they are cheap and entertaining to watch. Additionally, many of the club's talented young actors and actresses take part in many of the theater-oriented senior projects.
