= Georgetown, Luzerne County, Pennsylvania =

Unincorporated community in Pennsylvania, US

Georgetown, Pennsylvania
- Census-designated place
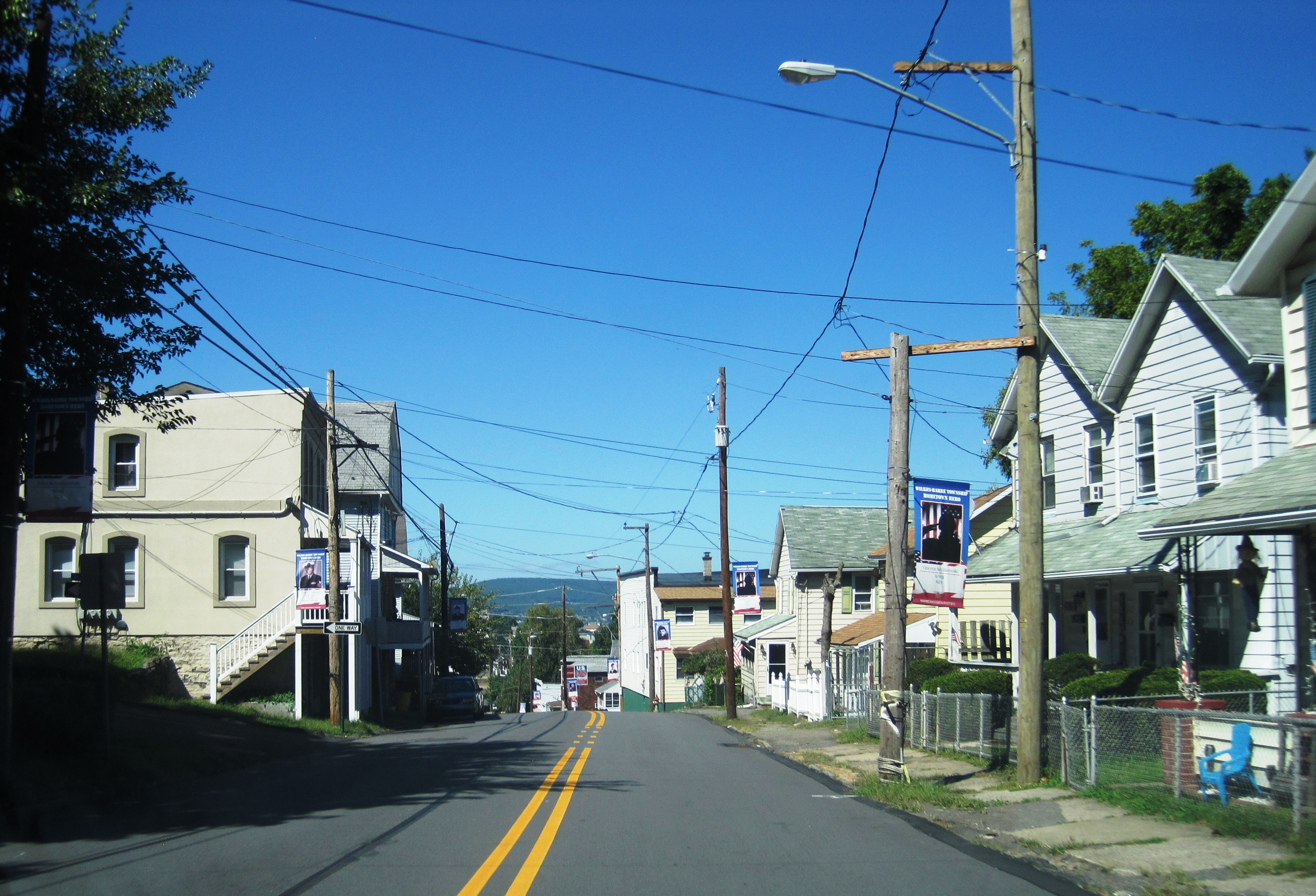
- Northbound Northampton Street

- Location in Pennsylvania Location in the United States
- Coordinates: 41°13′35″N 75°52′19″W
- Country: United States
- State: Pennsylvania
- County: Luzerne
- Township: Wilkes-Barre

Area
  - Total: 0.73 sq mi (1.9 km^{2})
  - Land: 0.73 sq mi (1.9 km^{2})
  - Water: 0 sq mi (0 km^{2})

Population (2010)
  - Total: 1,640
  - Density: 2,200/sq mi (860/km^{2})
- Time zone: UTC-5 (Eastern (EST))
  - Summer (DST): UTC-4 (EDT)
- ZIP code: 18702
- Area code: 570

Georgetown is a census-designated place (CDP) in Wilkes-Barre Township, Luzerne County, Pennsylvania, United States, adjacent to the city of Wilkes-Barre. The CDP population was 1,640 at the 2010 census.

== Geography ==
Georgetown is located at 41°13′35″N 75°52′19″W.

According to the United States Census Bureau, the CDP has a total area of 0.73 square miles (1.9 km^{2}), all land. Georgetown occupies most of the southwestern half of Wilkes-Barre Township and is bisected by I-81/PA 309. Exit 165 of I-81 is located at the southwestern edge of the CDP. The city of Wilkes-Barre is to the northwest.

== Education ==
It is in the Wilkes-Barre Area School District.
