= Luzerne County Community College =

Public college in Nanticoke, Pennsylvania, US

Coordinates: 41.193°N 75.993°W

- Type: Public community college
- Established: 1967 (59 years ago)
- Accreditation: MSCHE
- President: John Yudichak
- Students: 4,138
- Location: Nanticoke, Pennsylvania, U.S.
- Campus: Multi-campus
- Colors: Navy and teal
- Nickname: Trailblazers
- Mascots: Blaze, the Trailblazer Horse
- Website: www.luzerne.edu

Luzerne County Community College (LCCC) is a public community college in Nanticoke, Pennsylvania. LCCC offers over 100 academic, technical, and career programs. The institution uses an open admissions policy for most programs, and has over 35,000 graduates. In addition to the 167-acre main campus in Nanticoke, the school maintains 7 satellite learning centers located throughout Northeastern Pennsylvania. LCCC Dedicated Centers are located in Berwick, Wilkes-Barre, Scranton, Shamokin, Hazleton, Pittston, and Watsontown.

The college is accredited by the Middle States Commission on Higher Education. It offers 71 occupational programs (includes degree, certificate, and diploma programs), 25 liberal arts/transfer programs, 10 credit-free career training programs as well as numerous conferences, seminars, workshops, and business/industry customized training either on-campus or throughout the community.

During the fall 2024 semester approximately 6,000 students were enrolled in credit and noncredit courses. The student to faculty ratio is 18:1.

== Notable alumni ==
- Lou Barletta, politician
- Jimy Hettes, professional mixed martial artist
