= Huber Breaker =

Coal breaker and landmark in Pennsylvania, US

Coordinates: 41.210°N 75.906°W

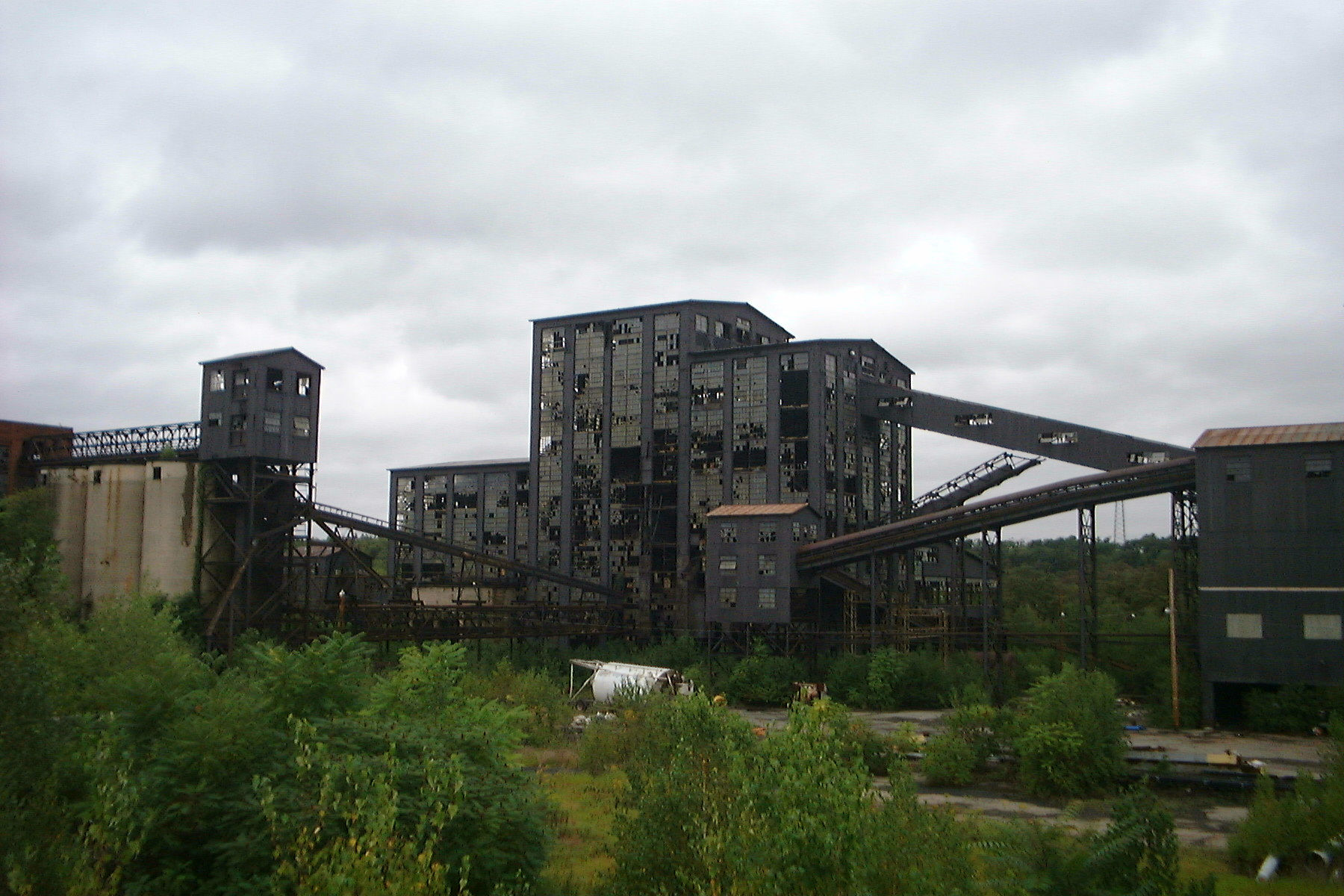
A disused Huber coal breaker in Ashley, Pennsylvania, September 2003

The Huber Breaker was a coal breaker and landmark located in the borough of Ashley, Luzerne County, Pennsylvania.

The breaker was built in 1939 to replace the Maxwell Breaker after sustaining damage during a strike in 1937. Run-of-mine coal arriving at the breaker was washed and cleaned to remove impurities, principally slate. It was crushed and screened to specific sizes desired by customers. Considered state of the art when constructed, the plant used Menzies cones to separate coal from waste. The breaker was operated by the Blue Coal Corporation, a subsidiary of the Glen Alden Coal Company. The former corporation's name is derived from its unique practice of spraying its processed coal with a blue iridescent chemical to be sold as "Blue Coal." It processed 7,000 tons of anthracite coal per day. Railcars were loaded underneath the breaker and shipped to markets. The long decline of the anthracite industry after World War II caused Blue Coal to declare bankruptcy and cease operations in 1976.

== Fate ==
The Huber Breaker Preservation Society lost its bid to purchase the breaker and 8 acres of land for $25,000 in a final attempt to save the landmark. A Philadelphia salvage dealer named Paselo Logistics LLC bid $1.28 million for the breaker and 26.58 acres of land in August 2013 and the U.S. Bankruptcy Court approved the sale. The demolition of the breaker started January 24, 2014. In September 2005, Scranton based Kanton Realty estimated the 900 tons of steel in the breaker had a scrap value of $85,000.

Demolition started on the breaker's outbuildings in the week of January 24, 2014. According to the new owner's attorney, Jonathan Comitz, the main breaker building would not be demolished until spring 2014. The Huber Breaker's main building was demolished on April 24, 2014. The last structure of the colliery, the powerhouse, was demolished in August 2014. The issue of whether asbestos was properly handled during demolition is still generating controversy among Ashley residents, Ashley Borough, and the Pennsylvania Department of Environmental Protection (DEP).

In April of 2016, Paselo Logistics LLC, owners of the Huber Breaker site, failed to follow a stipulation entered into alongside the DEP requiring Paselo Logistics to clean the site and remove contaminated soil, thus putting the site in violation of the PA Solid Waste Management Act. In December of that year, Paselo Logistics failed to comply with a court order to clean the site. The order states Paselo Logistics was to lawfully contain an unclassified liquid and safely dispose of other potentially hazardous waste; however, the company provided storage for only a portion of the total volume of the liquid and removed only a fraction of the waste. In a motion for additional sanctions against Paselo Logistics for their inaction, an attorney representing the DEP wrote the following:

While Paselo [Logistics] and its [owners] extracted a significant amount of metal from the site that they sold for profit, they have all but abandoned the site, leaving behind unresolved violations of Pennsylvania's environmental laws and this court's orders. ... Paselo has had over two years to take required corrective actions to address the open violations ... and has demonstrated it has no intention of complying.

The Pennsylvania Attorney General's Office, with assistance from the DEP, sent state agents to execute a search warrant of the Huber Breaker site on December 19, 2017.
