= Wilkes-Barre Township, Pennsylvania =

Township in Pennsylvania, US

Wilkes-Barre Township
- Home rule township
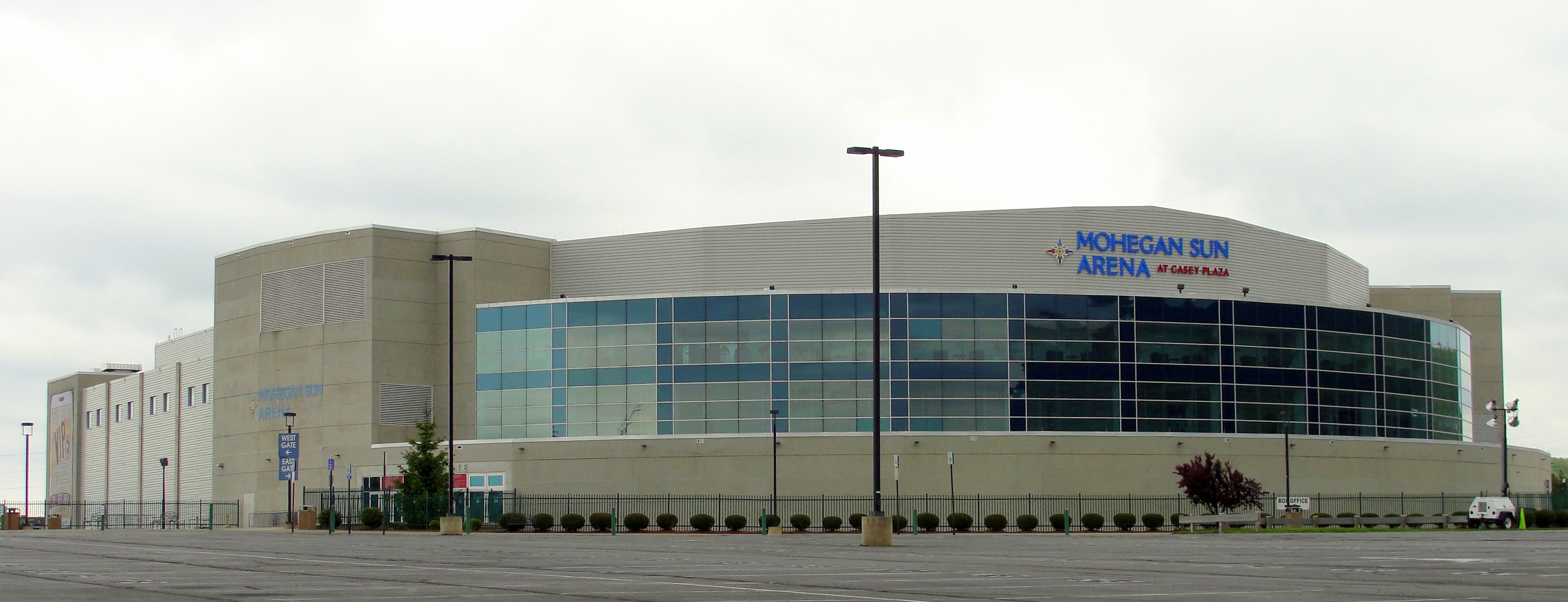
- Mohegan Sun Arena at Casey Plaza in Wilkes-Barre Township, home of the Wilkes-Barre/Scranton Penguins of the AHL

- Flag Seal

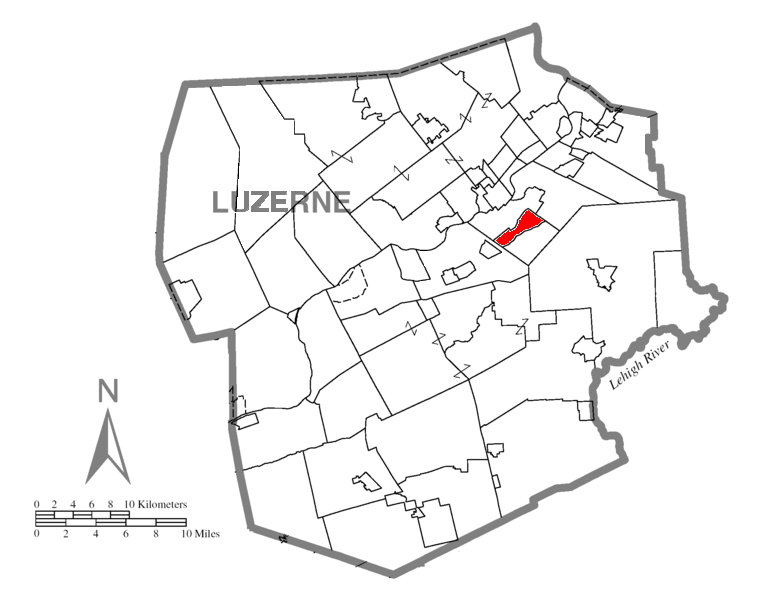
- Location of Wilkes-Barre Township in Luzerne County, Pennsylvania

- Location of Wilkes-Barre Township in Luzerne County, Pennsylvania Wilkes-Barre Township (the United States)
- Coordinates: 41°13′41″N 75°52′6″W
- Country: United States
- State: Pennsylvania
- County: Luzerne

Government
  - Type: Mayor and Council – Home Rule
  - Mayor: Carl Kuren

Area
  - Total: 2.86 sq mi (7.42 km^{2})
  - Land: 2.86 sq mi (7.42 km^{2})
  - Water: 0 sq mi (0.00 km^{2})

Population (2020)
  - Total: 3,219 ▲
  - Estimate (2021): 3,214
  - Density: 1,013.6/sq mi (391.36/km^{2})
- Time zone: UTC-5 (Eastern (EST))
  - Summer (DST): UTC-4 (EDT)
- FIPS code: 42-079-85160
- Website: twp.wilkesbarre.pa.us

Wilkes-Barre Township is a township with home rule status in Luzerne County, Pennsylvania, United States. It is adjacent to the city of Wilkes-Barre. The population of the township was 3,219 at the 2020 census.

== History ==
=== Founding ===
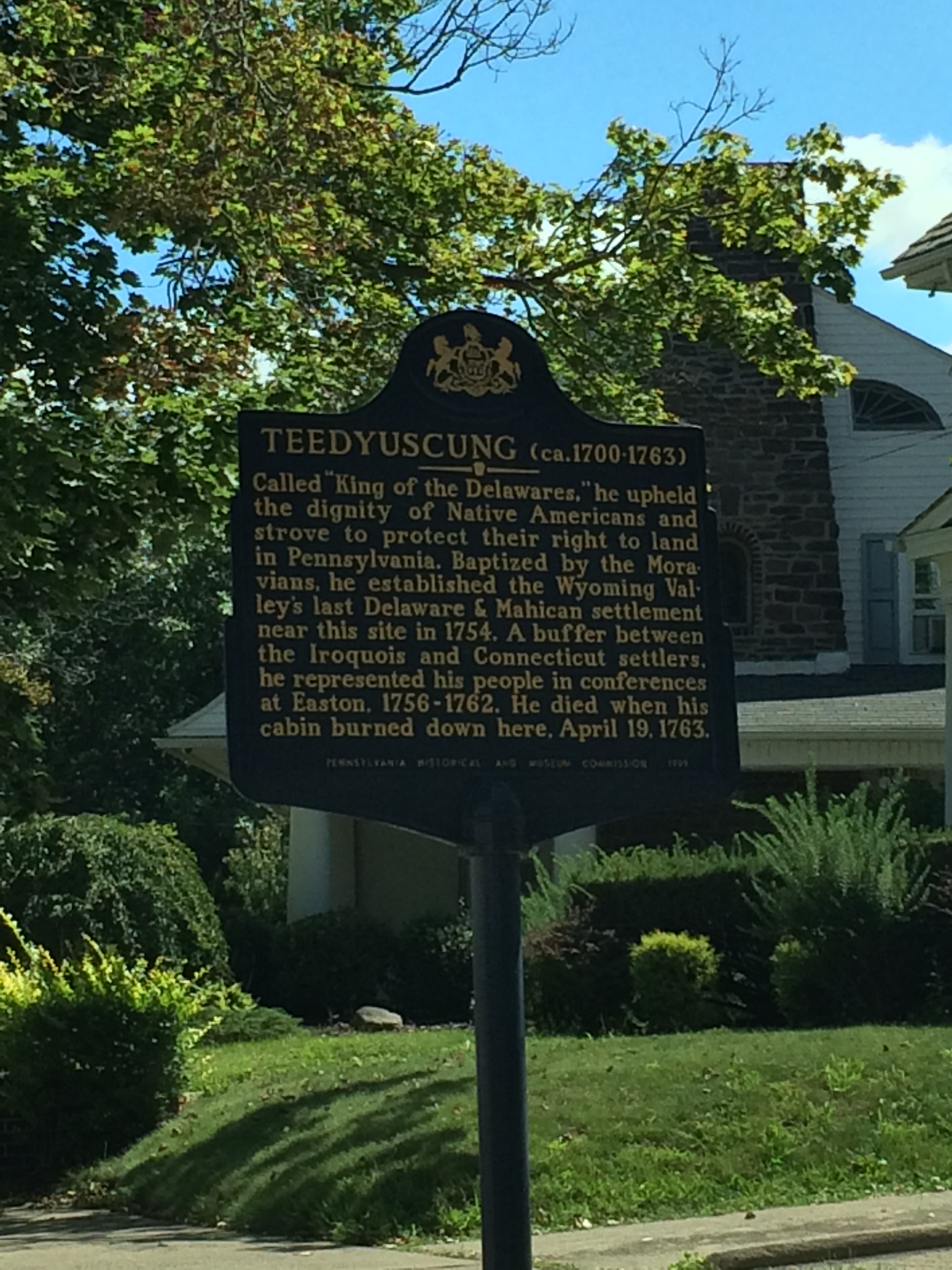
A plaque marking the approximate location of Teedyuscung’s death in 1763

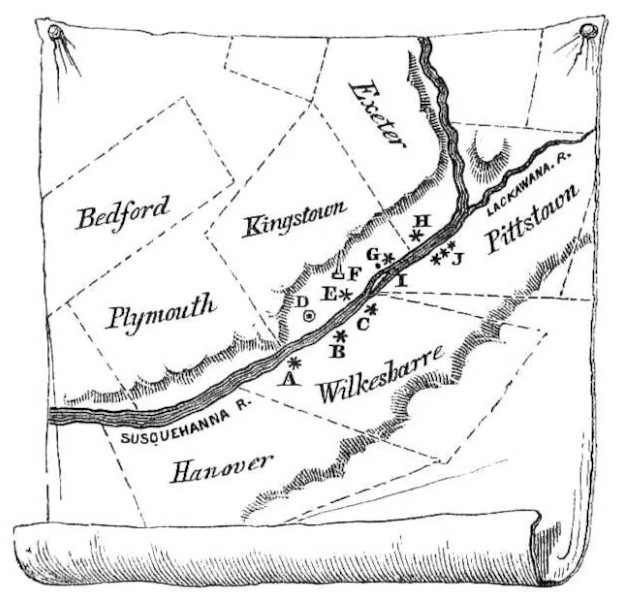
Wyoming Valley in 1778: Fort Durkee (A); Wilkes-Barre Township is visible on the right

In 1753, the Susquehanna Company was formed in Connecticut for settling the Wyoming Valley in present-day Pennsylvania. Connecticut succeeded in purchasing the land from the Native Americans; however, Pennsylvania already claimed the valley through a purchase they made in 1736. In 1762, roughly two hundred Connecticut settlers (Yankees) established a settlement near Mill Creek. They planted wheat and constructed log cabins. They returned to New England for the winter.

==== Massacre of 1763 ====
The Connecticut settlers returned in the spring of 1763 with their families. A party of Iroquois also visited the area with the dual purpose of inciting the Lenape and killing Teedyuscung, a local Delaware chief. On April 19, 1763, the residence of the chief and twenty others around it were set ablaze. Teedyuscung, under the influence of liquor, perished in the inferno. This was revenge for the death of an Iroquois warrior in 1758. The Iroquois allowed for the Delaware to believe that this atrocity was committed by the settlers. As a result, the Delaware attacked the colonists on October 15, 1763. Thirty settlers were killed, and several others were taken prisoner. Those who managed to escape fled back to New England. The Delaware then burned what was left of the Yankee settlement.

==== Pennamite–Yankee Wars ====
In 1769, during the colonial era, the Connecticut settlers (Yankees) returned to Wyoming Valley. Five townships were established by Connecticut Colony. Each one was five square miles and divided amongst forty settlers. Wilkes-Barre Township, named in honor of John Wilkes and Isaac Barré, was one of the original townships. Pennsylvanians (Pennamites) also arrived in the valley that same year.

The Connecticut settlers established Fort Durkee, which was named in honor of their leader (Colonel Durkee). This was immediately followed by a series of skirmishes between the Pennsylvanians and Connecticut settlers. The land changed hands several times between the two groups. Finally, after many years of fighting, the land was granted to Pennsylvania.

==== Coal mining ====
James Sutton built the first gristmill in the township in 1782. In 1806, a large portion of the territory broke away from the township to form the borough of Wilkes-Barre. Today, the township of Wilkes-Barre occupies a 1-by-3-mile (1.6 by 4.8 km) strip of land adjacent to the southeast border of what is now the city of Wilkes-Barre.

Coal mining was a prominent industry in and around Wilkes-Barre Township in the late 19th and early 20th century. The Laurel Run mine fire started near the village of Georgetown in 1915. The fire under Georgetown was controlled by blocking off the tunnels in the vicinity, robbing it of the necessary oxygen to continue burning.

=== Expanding commerce ===
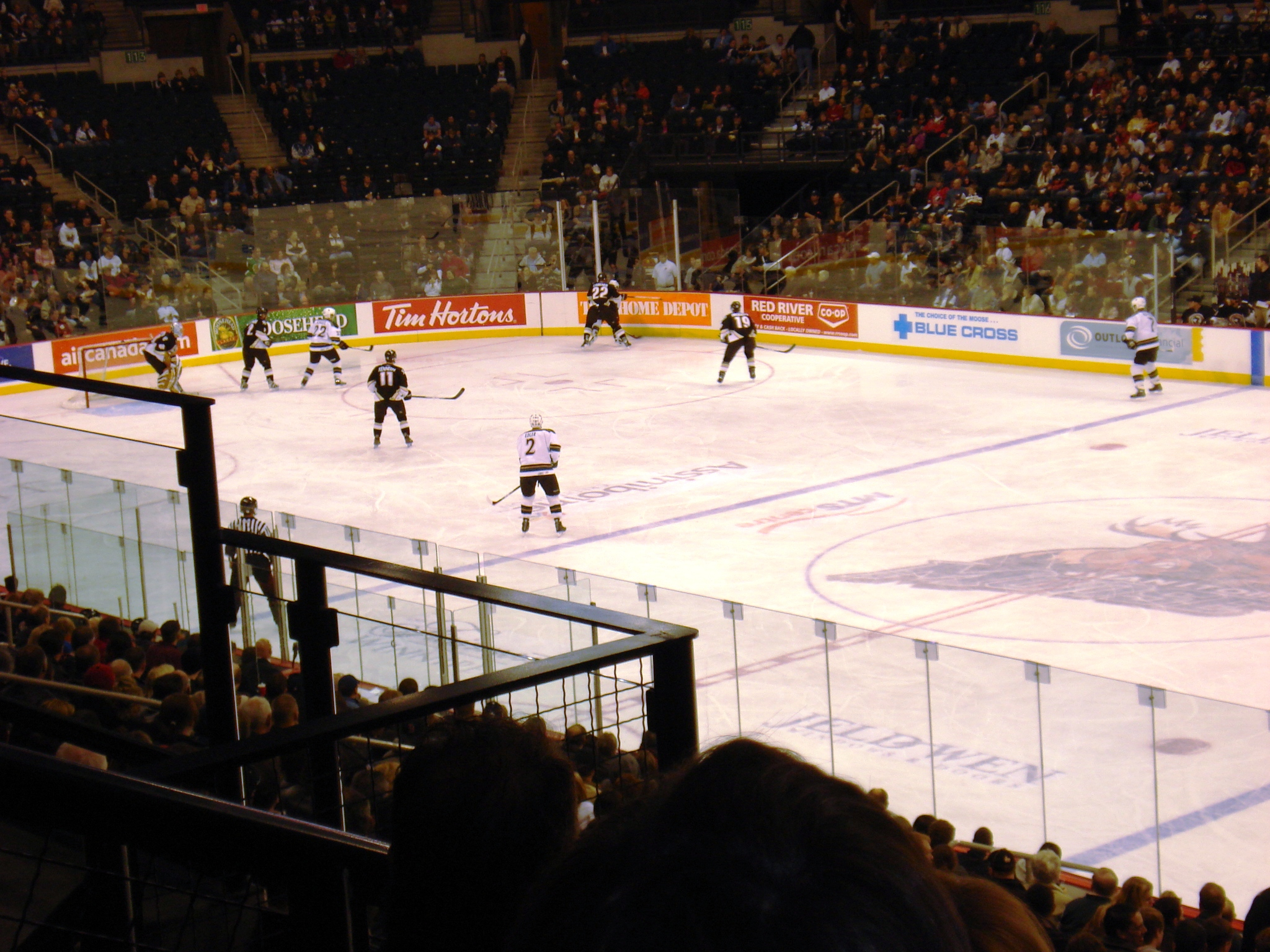
Ice hockey inside the Mohegan Sun Arena at Casey Plaza

The township became a commercial destination in northeastern Pennsylvania, adding the Mohegan Sun Arena at Casey Plaza and several major shopping hubs, including the Arena Hub Plaza, Wilkes-Barre Township Commons, Wilkes-Barre Township Marketplace, and Wyoming Valley Mall. Most of these shopping areas were developed in the early 2000s, although the Wyoming Valley Mall was constructed in the 1970s following the aftermath of Hurricane Agnes.

=== Tornadoes ===
The township underwent several devastating tornadoes in the early 20th century (in 1914 and 1917). On Wednesday, June 13, 2018 (at about 10 pm), an EF2 tornado struck the business district of Wilkes-Barre Township. Dozens of commercial buildings were severely damaged. The National Weather Service stated "the tornado touched down near the La-Z-Boy furniture store at Mundy Street and Highland Park Boulevard and continued for three-quarters of a mile ending near I-81 behind Dick's Sporting Goods in the Arena Hub Plaza. It's estimated that the tornado was on the ground for about five minutes." Six people sustained minor injuries.

== Geography ==
Wilkes-Barre Township is located at 41°13′40″N 75°52′5″W (41.227931, −75.868282).

According to the U.S. Census Bureau, the township has a total area of 2.9 square miles (7.4 km^{2}), all land. It is crossed from northeast to southwest by I-81/PA 309 and PA 309 Business (Wilkes-Barre Township Boulevard). I-81 has two interchanges in the township: one at the southwest end with PA 309 and one in the central portion near the Mohegan Sun Arena at Casey Plaza. Other important roads are Kidder Street, Mundy Street, Highland Park Boulevard, Coal Street, Northampton Street, and Blackman Street. Its only village is Georgetown on Northampton Street.

== Climate ==
The township has a humid continental climate (Dfa/Dfb) and the hardiness zone is 6a. Average monthly temperatures in the vicinity of exit 168 of I-81 (connecting with Highland Park Boulevard) range from 25.6 °F (−3.6 °C) in January to 71.5 °F (21.9 °C) in July.

== Demographics ==
Historical population
| Census | Pop. | Note | %± |
|---|---|---|---|
| 2000 | 3,235 | | — |
| 2010 | 2,967 | | −8.3% |
| 2020 | 3,219 | | 8.5% |
| 2021 (est.) | 3,214 | | −0.2% |
U.S. Decennial Census

As of the census of 2000, there were 3,235 people, 1,455 households, and 846 families residing in the township. The population density was 1,093.2 inhabitants per square mile (422.1/km^{2}). There were 1,572 housing units at an average density of 531.2 units per square mile (205.1 units/km^{2}). The racial makeup of the township was 92.92% White, 2.35% African American, 0.22% Native American, 3.62% Asian, 0.09% from other races, and 0.80% from two or more races. 0.77% of the population were Hispanic or Latino of any race.

There were 1,455 households, out of which 22.3% had children under the age of 18 living with them, 42.4% were married couples living together, 11.4% had a female householder with no husband present, and 41.8% were non-families. 37.2% of all households were made up of individuals, and 17.1% had someone living alone who was 65 years of age or older. The average household size was 2.16 and the average family size was 2.86.

In the township, the population was spread out, with 17.9% under the age of 18, 6.4% from 18 to 24, 30.8% from 25 to 44, 22.1% from 45 to 64, and 22.8% who were 65 years of age or older. The median age was 42 years. For every 100 females there were 92.4 males. For every 100 females age 18 and over, there were 87.6 males.

The median income for a household in the township was $30,603, and the median income for a family was $37,188. Males had a median income of $30,806 versus $27,426 for females. The per capita income for the township was $20,055. About 7.2% of families and 9.5% of the population were below the poverty line, including 6.2% of those under age 18 and 13.1% of those age 65 or over.
