= Nanticoke, Pennsylvania =

City in Pennsylvania, United States

- City
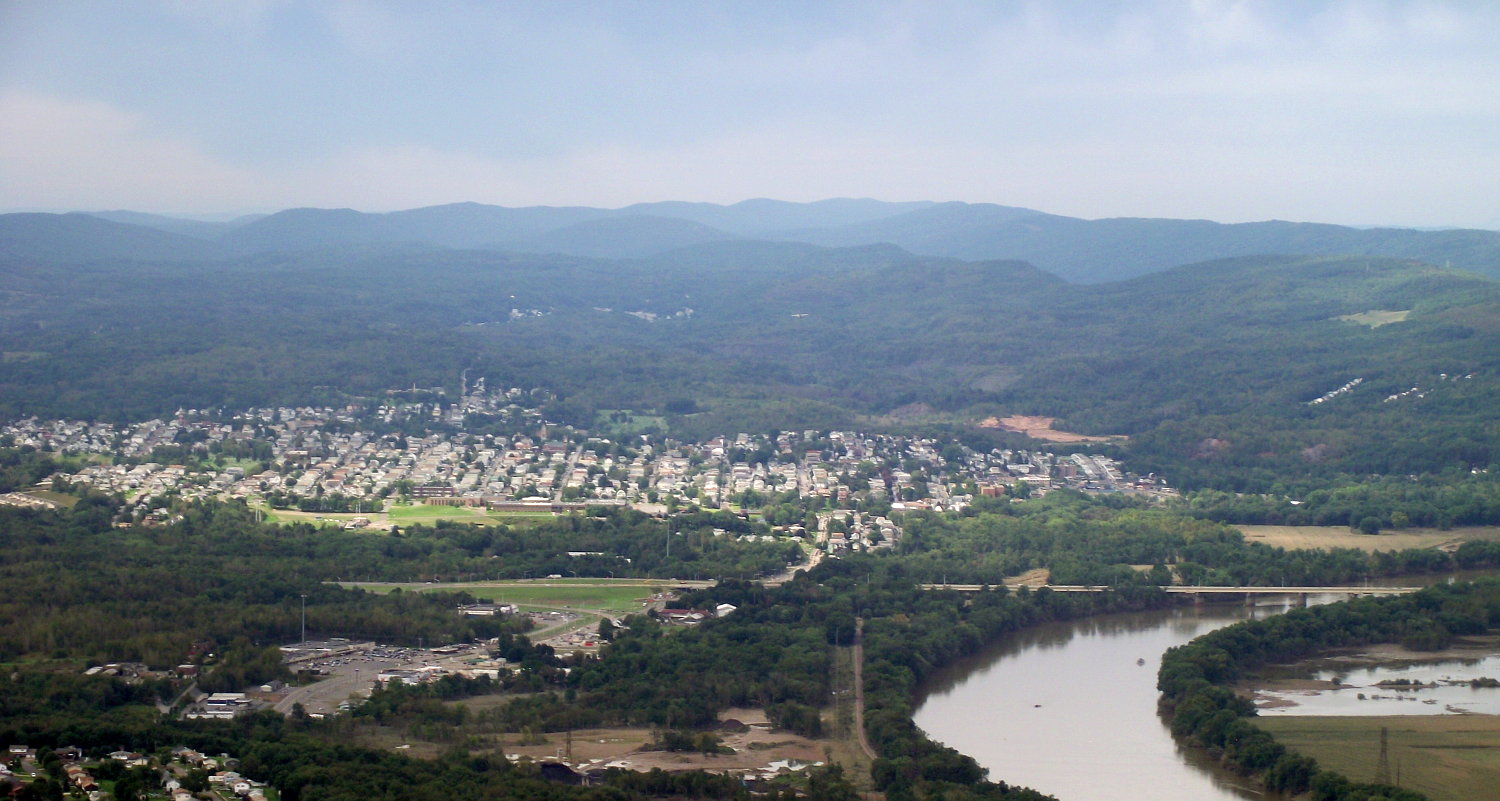
- Aerial view of Nanticoke

- Flag Coat of arms

- Location of Nanticoke in Luzerne County, Pennsylvania

- Location of Nanticoke in Pennsylvania Nanticoke (the United States)
- Coordinates: 41°11′58″N 75°59′57″W
- Country: United States
- State: Pennsylvania
- County: Luzerne
- Settled: 1800
- Incorporated (borough): 1874
- Incorporated (city): 1926

Government
  - Type: City Council
  - Mayor: Kevin Coughlin

Area
  - Total: 3.55 sq mi (9.20 km^{2})
  - Land: 3.46 sq mi (8.95 km^{2})
  - Water: 0.097 sq mi (0.25 km^{2})
- Elevation: 696 ft (212 m)

Population (2020)
  - Total: 10,628
  - Density: 3,074/sq mi (1,186.9/km^{2})
- Time zone: UTC-5 (Eastern (EST))
  - Summer (DST): UTC-4 (EDT)
- Zip Code: 18634
- Area code: 570
- FIPS code: 42-52584
- Website: nanticokecity.com

Nanticoke is a city in Luzerne County, Pennsylvania, United States. As of the 2020 census, the population was 10,628, making it the third largest city in Luzerne County. It occupies 3.6 square miles (9.3 km^{2}) of land. Nanticoke is part of Northeastern Pennsylvania.

The city can be divided into several sections: Honey Pot (northwestern Nanticoke), Downtown (northern and central Nanticoke), and Hanover Section (southeastern Nanticoke). It was once an active coal mining community. Today, the 167-acre main campus of Luzerne County Community College is located within the city.

== History ==
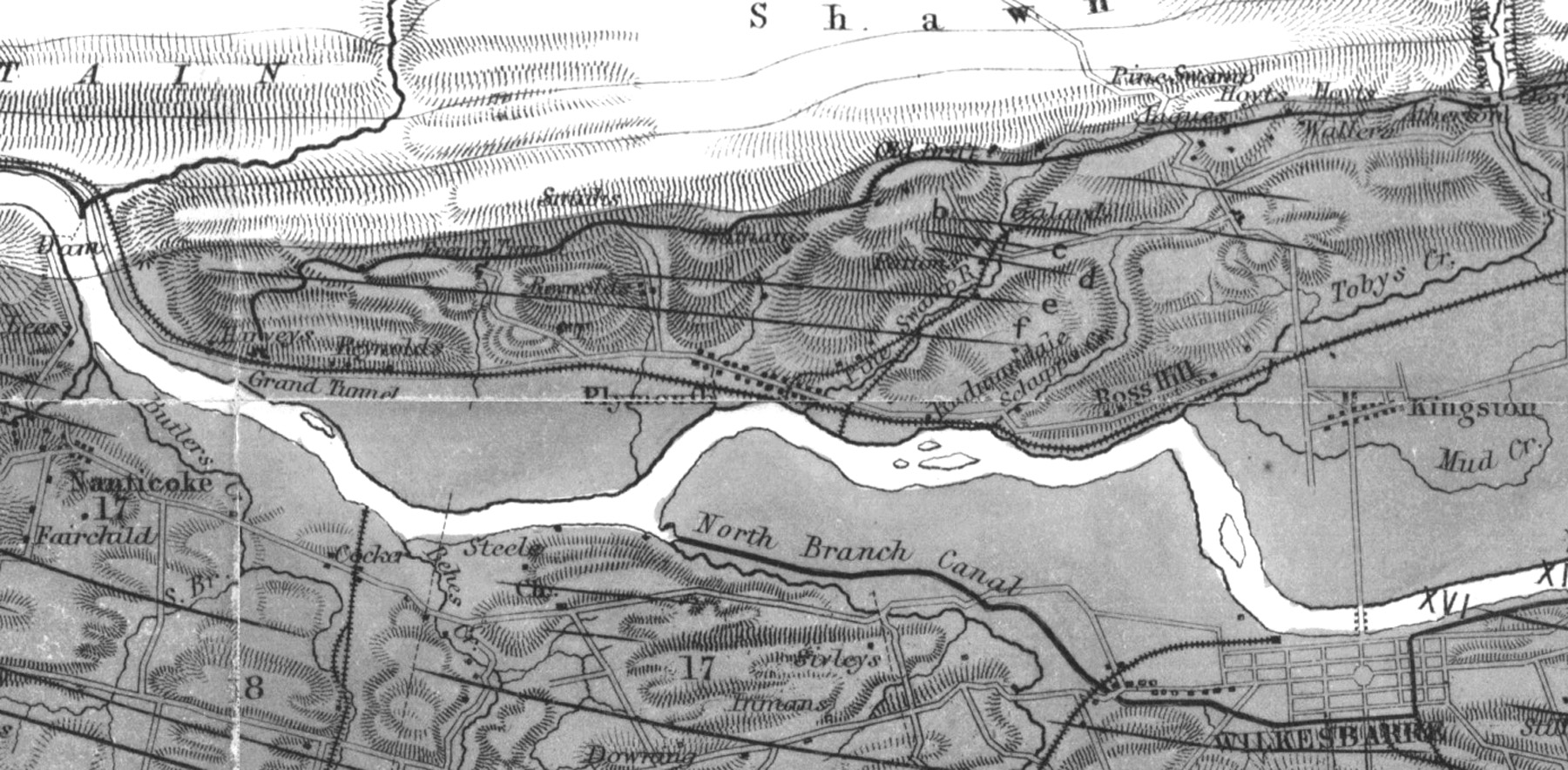
1858 anthracite map with Nanticoke visible on the far left

=== Early history ===
The name Nanticoke was derived from Nentego ("tidewater people"), an Algonquian-speaking Native American people who moved to the Wyoming Valley when their Chesapeake Bay homelands were spoiled for hunting by the European settlers. For quite some time, the tribe maintained a village in the valley before Europeans settled there. The nearby Nanticoke Creek, also named after the tribe, was once known as Muddy Run. However, its current name was appearing on maps as early as 1776. The creek has also historically been referred to by many other names, including Lee's Creek, Miller's Creek, Robbins Creek, Bobbs Creek, Rummage Creek, and Warrior Run Creek. All of these names were described as erroneous in Henry C. Bradsby's 1893 book History of Luzerne County, Pennsylvania.

A forge was constructed on Nanticoke Creek in 1778 by Mason F. Alden and John Alden. During that same year, a log gristmill was also built near the creek by a Mr. Chapman. The mill was heavily guarded in 1780. By 1793, a sawmill and gristmill both existed on the creek.

=== Incorporation ===
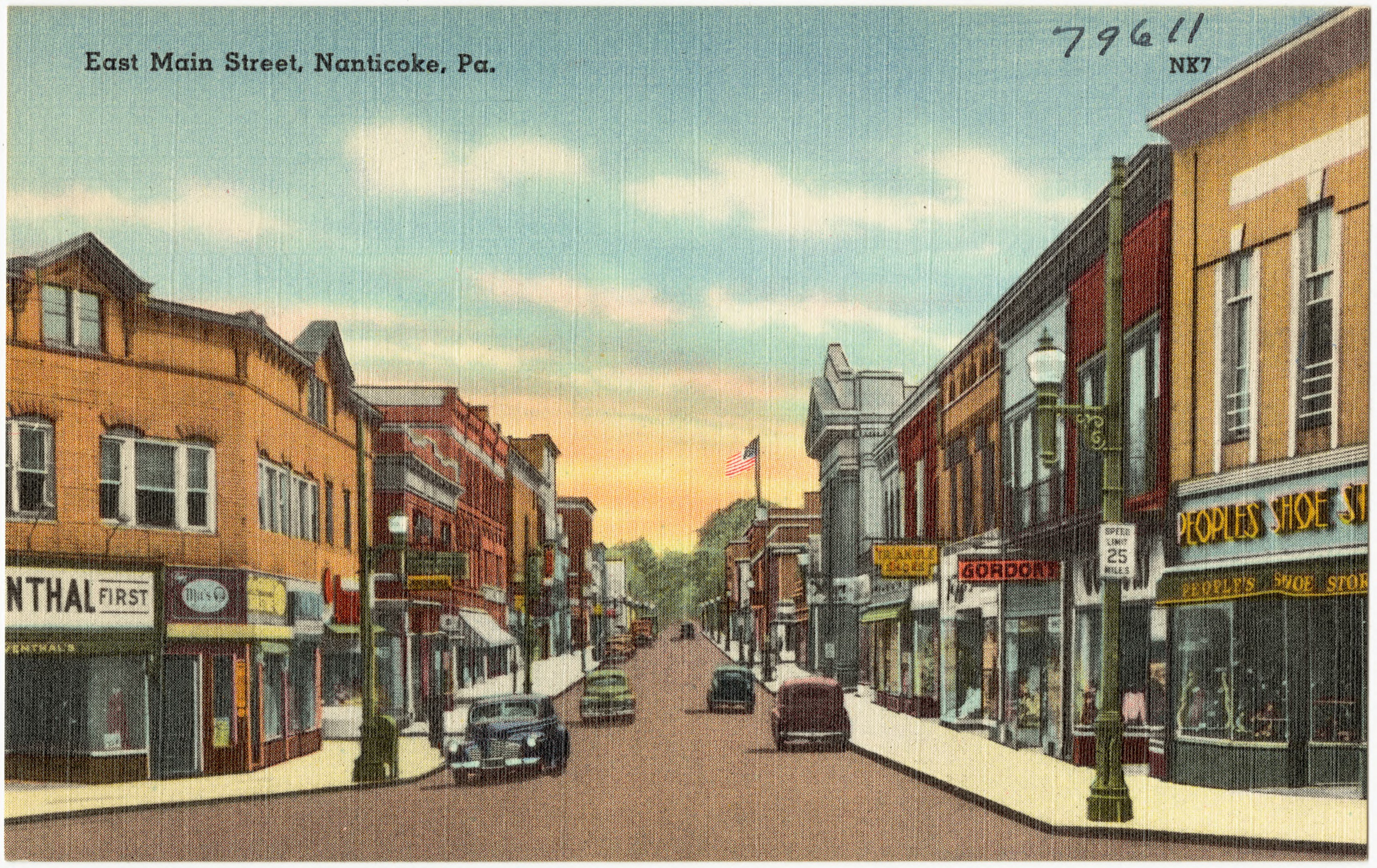
An old postcard of Main Street

In the 19th century, Nanticoke was carved out of Hanover Township and Newport Township. The settlement was incorporated as a village in 1830; Nanticoke was chartered by the Pennsylvania Legislature as a borough on January 31, 1874. Nanticoke experienced its greatest population increase between 1917 and 1925. This allowed for it to qualify as a third class city.

The citizens voted in the fall of 1924 to form a city government; and elections were held the following year. The new city government consisted of a mayor and several councilmen, who took office in January 1926 (which was the official date of becoming a third class city). The first mayor of Nanticoke City was Dan Sakowski.

=== Post-incorporation ===
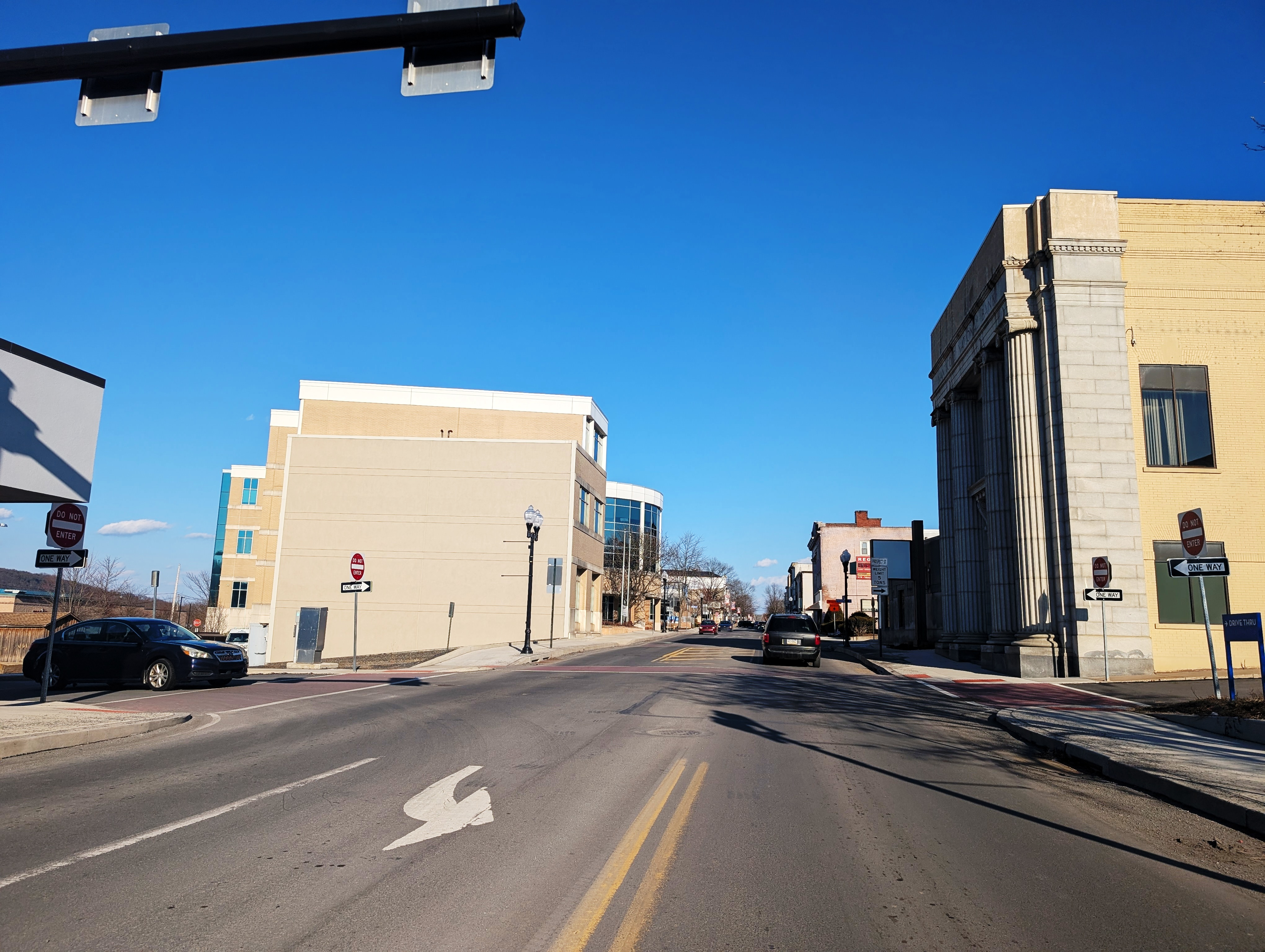
Main Street in Downtown Nanticoke

Samuel H. Kress opened his first store, which grew into the national S. H. Kress & Co. chain, in Nanticoke.

The city gained prominence in the late 19th and early 20th centuries as an active anthracite coal mining community, drawing a large portion of its labor force from European immigrants. At its peak, in the 1930s, the city was home to over 27,000 people. However, when the mining industry in the region collapsed, Nanticoke witnessed urban decay and a shrinking population. The collapse of the mining industry also left behind a scarred landscape – abandoned mines, breakers, buildings, and pollution in Nanticoke Creek due to mine drainage. Concrete City, built by the Delaware, Lackawanna and Western Railroad's coal division in 1911, is located near the Hanover Section of Nanticoke. Abandoned since 1924, it was designated as an historic site in 1998, and its remnants still stand as a tourist attraction. The original entrance has since been bulldozed. However, there is an alternate route that does not appear on maps; it can be found at the end of Bliss and Mosier Streets.

In 1967, Luzerne County Community College, a two-year community college, was established in the city. Today, the main campus covers roughly 167 acres in Nanticoke. The school also maintains eleven satellite learning centers located throughout Northeastern Pennsylvania.

Nanticoke City officials voted unanimously to apply for Act 47, or economically distressed city status, which was granted by the state in 2006. Nanticoke faced a projected $700,000 deficit that year, with revenues flat and falling far behind expenses.

== Geography ==
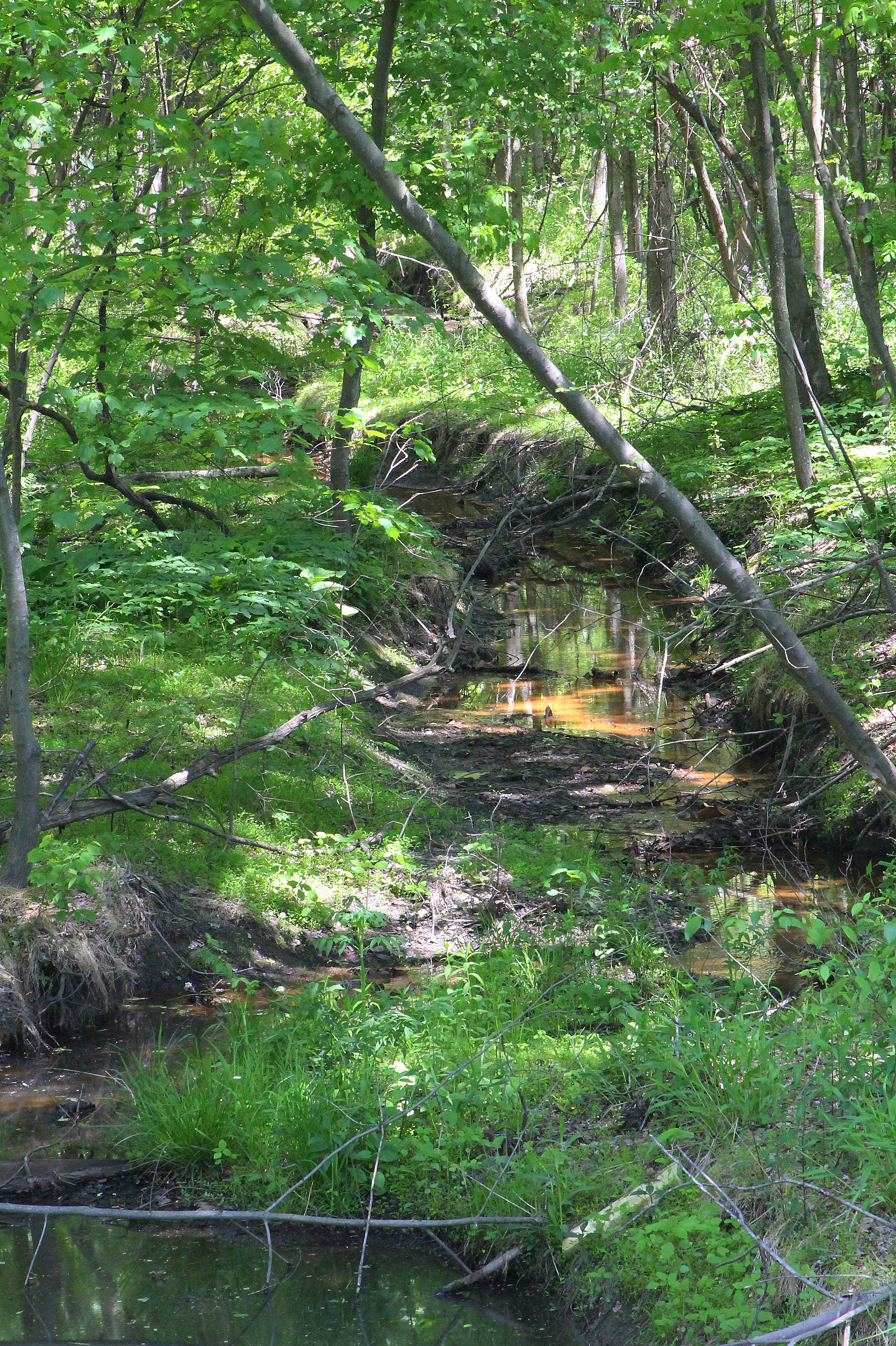
Nanticoke Creek

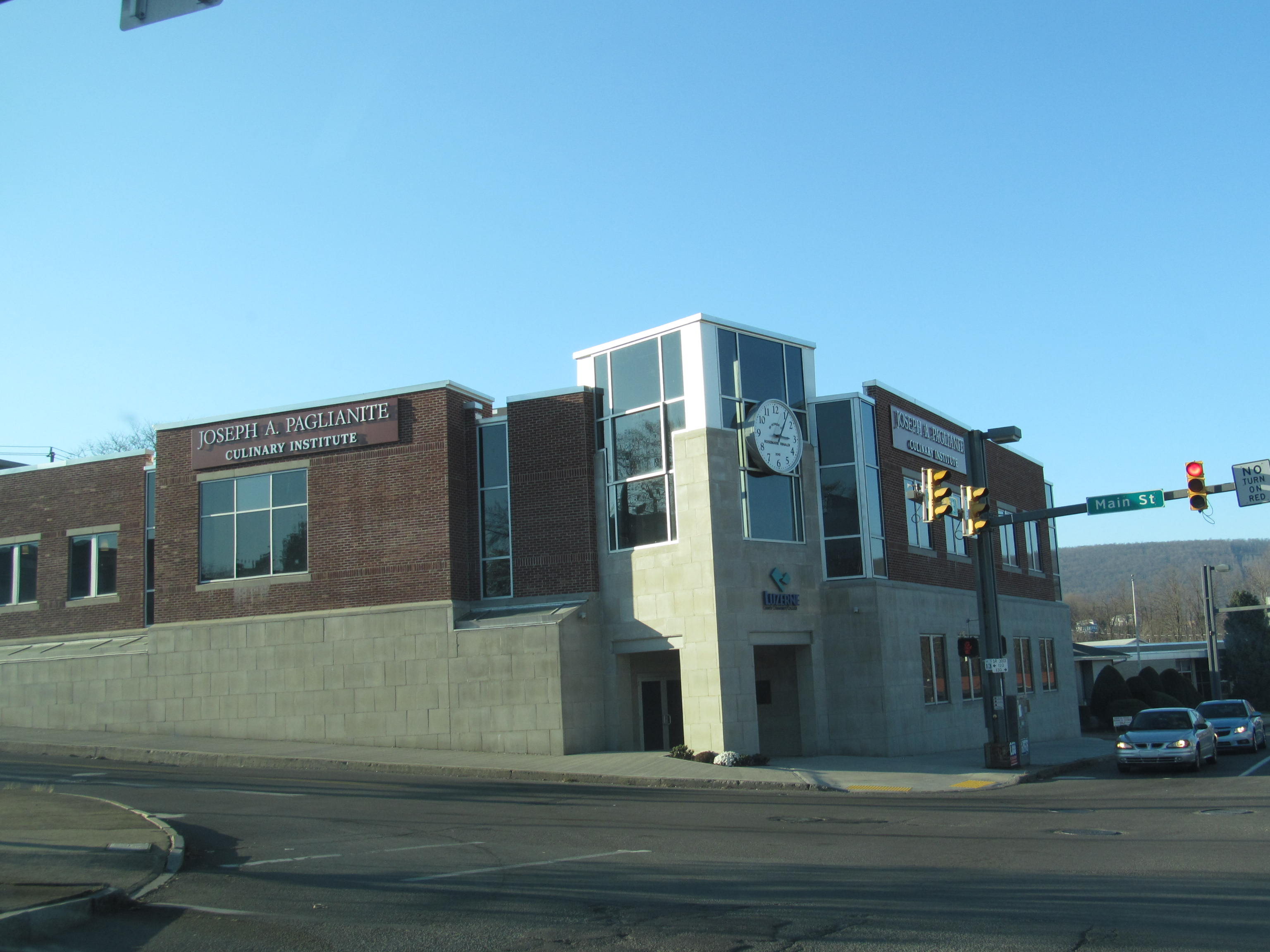
Downtown Nanticoke

According to the United States Census Bureau, the city has a total area of 3.6 square miles (9.3 km^{2}), of which 3.5 square miles (9.1 km^{2}) is land and 0.1 square miles (0.26 km^{2}), or 3.05%, is water. Nanticoke is located in the Wyoming Valley (near the Susquehanna River). The elevation is 696 feet (212 m). Both the Lower Broadway Street Bridge and the South Cross Valley Expressway cross over the Susquehanna River and connect Nanticoke with Plymouth Township. The topography of Nanticoke is hilly. The city can be divided into several sections: Honey Pot (northwestern Nanticoke), Downtown (northern and central Nanticoke), and Hanover Section (southeastern Nanticoke). Nanticoke Creek and Newport Creek run through the city.

=== Adjacent municipalities ===
- Hanover Township (east and south)
- Newport Township (west and south)
- Plymouth Township (north)

=== Climate ===
Nanticoke has a hot-summer humid continental climate (Dfa) and the hardiness zone is 6a bordering on 6b. Average monthly temperatures range from 26.9 °F in January to 72.6 °F in July.

== Demographics ==
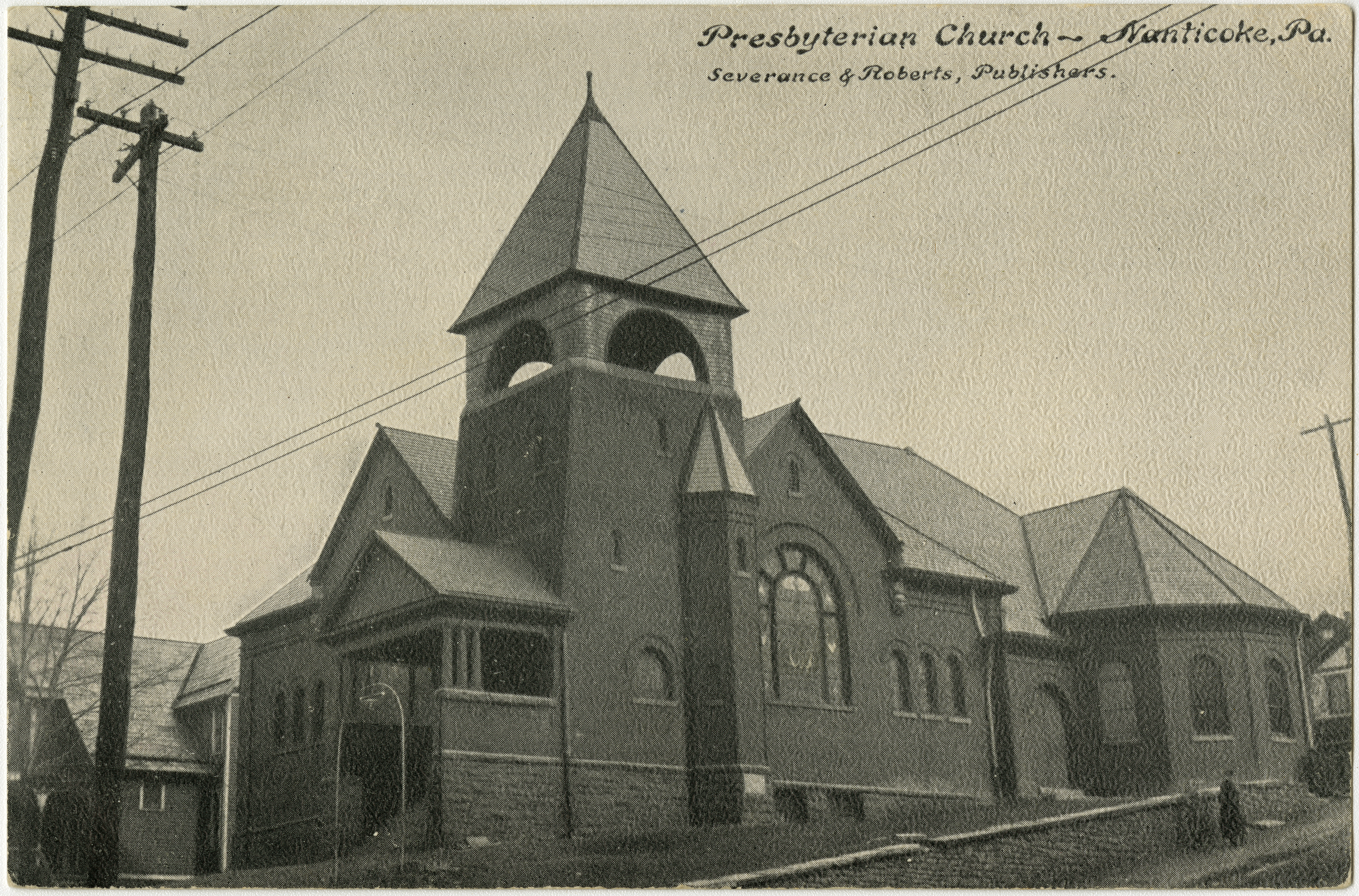
First Presbyterian Church

Historical population
Census	Pop.	Note	%±
1880	3,884		—
1890	10,044		158.6%
1900	12,116		20.6%
1910	18,877		55.8%
1920	22,614		19.8%
1930	26,043		15.2%
1940	24,387		−6.4%
1950	20,160		−17.3%
1960	15,601		−22.6%
1970	14,638		−6.2%
1980	13,044		−10.9%
1990	12,267		−6.0%
2000	10,955		−10.7%
2010	10,465		−4.5%
2020	10,628		1.6%

At its height, in the 1930s, the city of Nanticoke was home to over 27,000 people.

=== 2020 census ===
As of the 2020 census, Nanticoke had a population of 10,628. The median age was 42.9 years. 20.0% of residents were under the age of 18 and 20.9% of residents were 65 years of age or older. For every 100 females there were 93.8 males, and for every 100 females age 18 and over there were 91.5 males age 18 and over.

99.7% of residents lived in urban areas, while 0.3% lived in rural areas.

There were 4,665 households in Nanticoke, of which 24.4% had children under the age of 18 living in them. Of all households, 32.8% were married-couple households, 23.6% were households with a male householder and no spouse or partner present, and 34.3% were households with a female householder and no spouse or partner present. About 36.6% of all households were made up of individuals and 17.1% had someone living alone who was 65 years of age or older.

There were 5,370 housing units, of which 13.1% were vacant. The homeowner vacancy rate was 1.5% and the rental vacancy rate was 8.0%.

Racial composition as of the 2020 census
Race	Number	Percent
White	9,193	86.5%
Black or African American	527	5.0%
American Indian and Alaska Native	18	0.2%
Asian	52	0.5%
Native Hawaiian and Other Pacific Islander	1	0.0%
Some other race	266	2.5%
Two or more races	571	5.4%
Hispanic or Latino (of any race)	747	7.0%

=== 2000 census ===
As of the 2000 census, there were 10,955 people, 4,850 households, and 2,905 families residing in the city. The population density was 3,124.0 inhabitants per square mile (1,206.2/km^{2}). There were 5,487 housing units at an average density of 1,564.7 per square mile (604.1/km^{2}). The racial makeup of the city was 98.84% White, 0.27% African American, 0.10% Native American, 0.26% Asian, 0.01% Pacific Islander, 0.16% from other races, and 0.37% from two or more races. Hispanic or Latino of any race were 0.45% of the population.

There were 4,850 households, out of which 23.5% had children under the age of 18 living with them, 42.6% were married couples living together, 12.7% had a female householder with no husband present, and 40.1% were non-families. 35.7% of all households were made up of individuals, and 20.0% had someone living alone who was 65 years of age or older. The average household size was 2.21 and the average family size was 2.88.

In the city, the population was spread out, with 19.7% under the age of 18, 7.5% from 18 to 24, 25.8% from 25 to 44, 23.7% from 45 to 64, and 23.3% who were 65 years of age or older. The median age was 43 years. For every 100 females, there were 87.6 males. For every 100 females age 18 and over, there were 83.3 males.

The median income for a household in the city was $26,169, and the median income for a family was $35,444. Males had a median income of $30,125 versus $20,265 for females. The per capita income for the city was $15,348. About 11.5% of families and 15.8% of the population were below the poverty line, including 24.1% of those under age 18 and 11.4% of those age 65 or over.

- Ancestries:
  - Polish (49.7%)
  - German (13.0%)
  - Irish (10.8%)
  - Italian (8.4%)
  - Welsh (6.4%)
  - Slovak (5.3%)

== Government ==
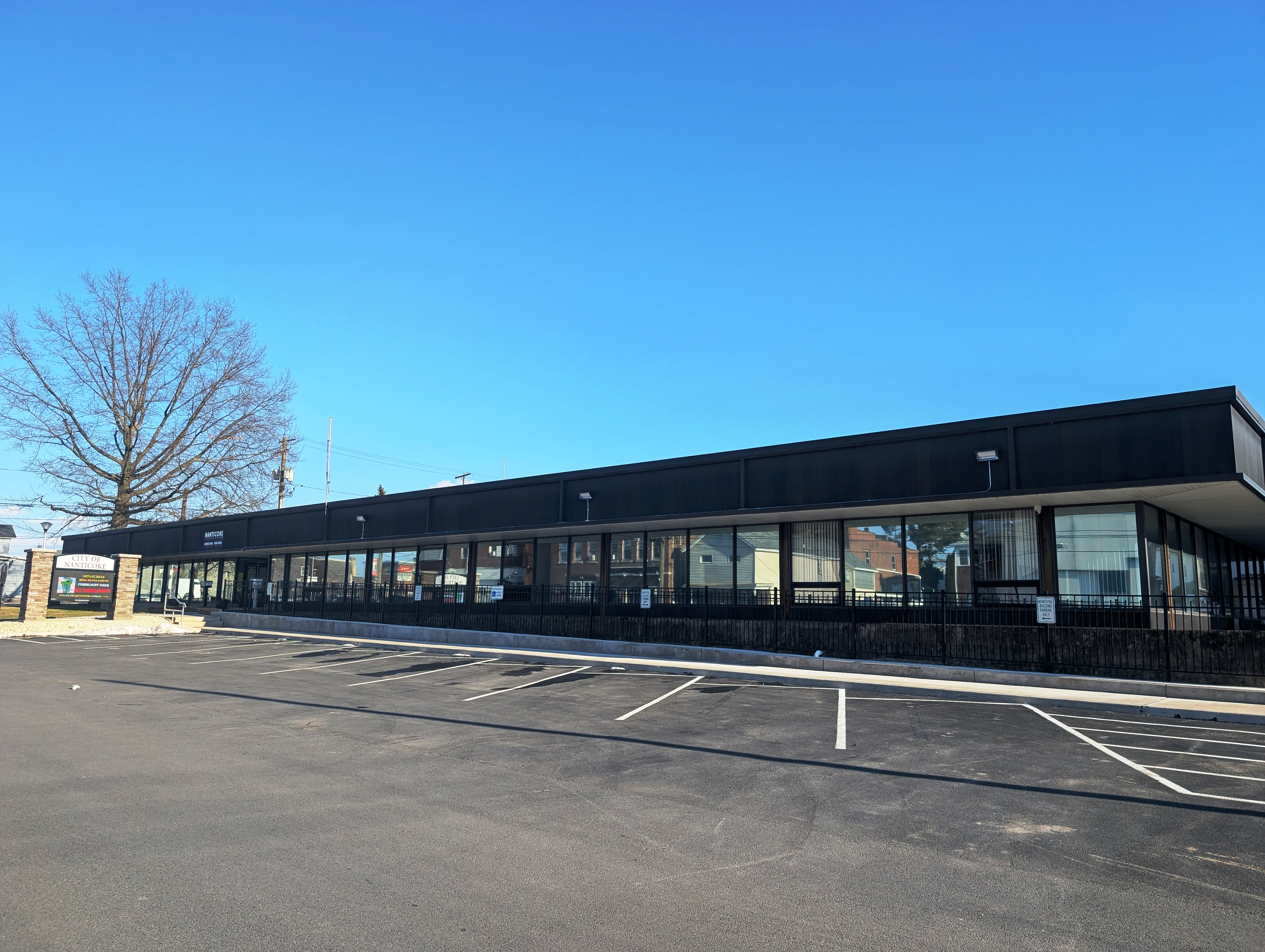
Nanticoke Municipal Building

Nanticoke was incorporated as a third class city in 1926.

- Mayor: Kevin Coughlin
- City Administrator: Donna Wall

=== Public safety ===
Nanticoke City has its own police department and fire department. The police department provides full-time protection for its citizens, visitors, businesses, and public property. The fire department consists of a combination of career and volunteer firefighters. It provides a variety of services, including fire extinguishment, rescue, and emergency medical services. The department also provides its citizens with fire safety education and prevention programs.

== Education ==
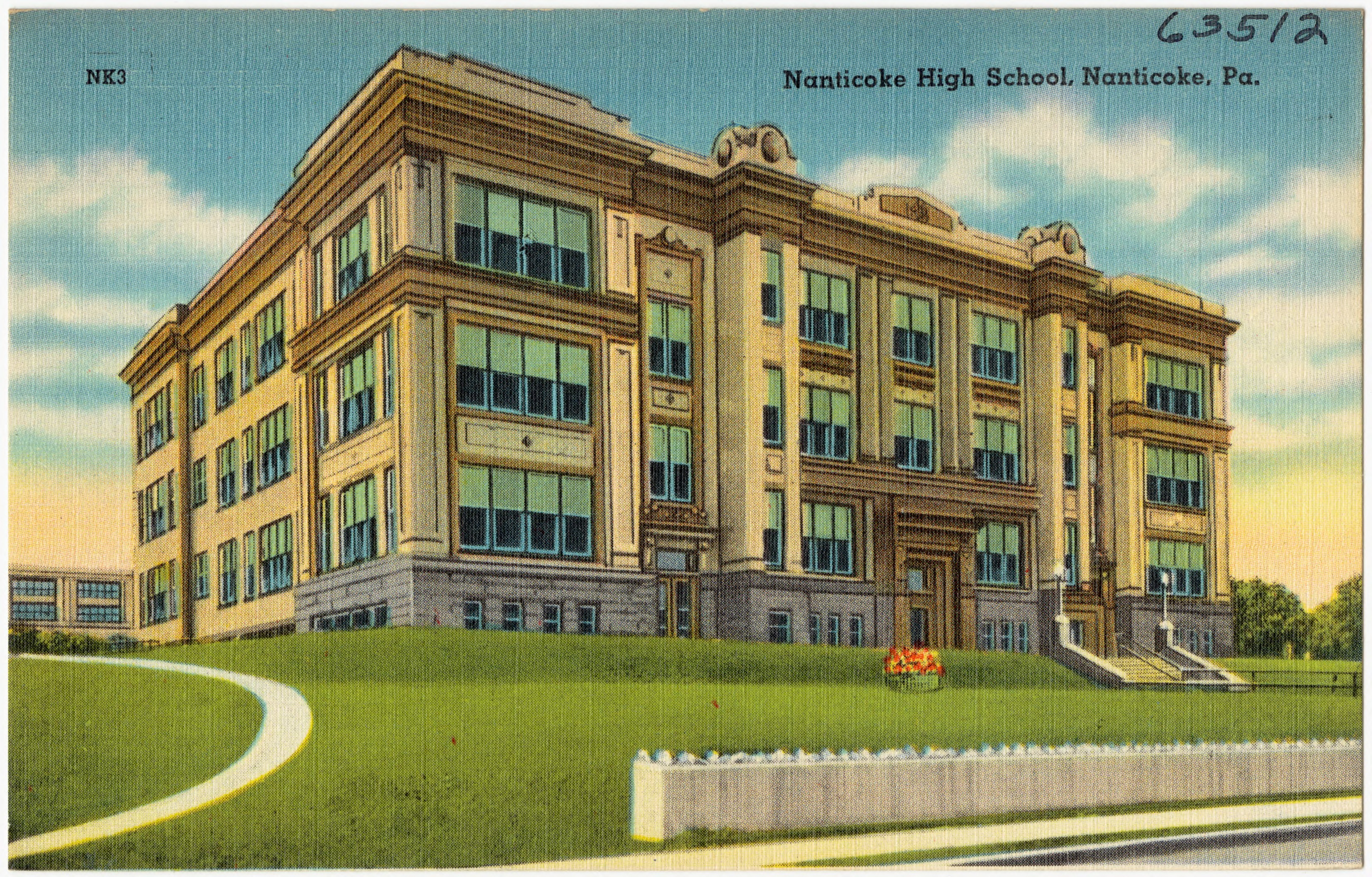
An old postcard of Nanticoke High School

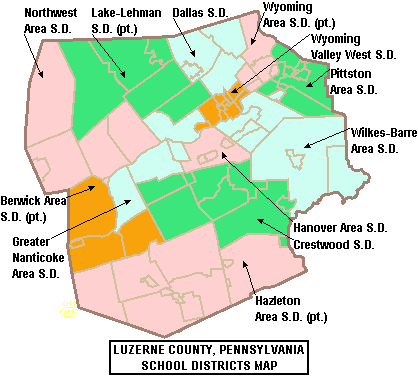
Greater Nanticoke Area School District (seen in blue)

- Greater Nanticoke Area School District serves the city of Nanticoke and the surrounding townships of Plymouth, Newport, and Conyningham. Greater Nanticoke Area School District encompasses approximately 52 square miles (130 km^{2}).
- Luzerne County Community College (LCCC) is a two-year community college located in Nanticoke. LCCC offers over 100 academic, technical, and career programs. It has an open admissions policy for most programs and has over 30,000 graduates. In addition to the 167-acre main campus in Nanticoke, the school maintains 11 satellite learning centers located throughout Northeastern Pennsylvania. College Centers are located in Berwick, Wilkes-Barre, Scranton, Shamokin, Hazleton, and Kulpmont.
- Mill Memorial Library

== Media ==
WQFM 92.1 FM, WSFX-FM at 89.1, WVHO 94.5 FM, and WAZL 730 AM are licensed in Nanticoke.

== Infrastructure ==
=== Transportation ===
==== Major highways ====
- I-81
- US 11
- PA 29

==== Bus ====
- Nanticoke is served by the Luzerne County Transportation Authority, which provides bus service to the city and other communities within Luzerne County and Lackawanna County.

==== Rail ====
- Rail line service is provided by the Norfolk Southern Railway; the city is situated on the railroad's Sunbury Line (where a small freight yard is located).

==== Airports ====
- The Wilkes-Barre/Scranton International Airport is located in Pittston Township. The airport is served by eight international airlines and has hosted Air Force One on regional presidential visits several times in the past. In the spring of 2002, the airport began offering an increased number of non-stop flights across the nation. Service is provided by American Airlines, Delta Air Lines, and United Airlines.
- The Wilkes-Barre Wyoming Valley Airport is located three miles north of Wilkes-Barre.
- The Hazleton Municipal Airport is located two miles northwest of Hazleton.

== Notable people ==
- Nick Adams (1931–1968), actor, screenwriter, best known to audiences as Johnny Yuma in the TV series The Rebel
- Thomas Cynfelyn Benjamin (1850–1925), Welsh language poet and congregational minister, was the first minister of Moriah Congregational Church in Nanticoke
- Steve Bilko (1928–1978), played professional baseball for the St. Louis Cardinals
- Al Cihocki (1924–2014), a Major League Baseball infielder who played for the Cleveland Indians
- Stanley Dudrick (1935–2020), surgeon who developed total parenteral nutrition
- John S. Fine (1893–1978), 35th Governor of Pennsylvania from 1951 to 1955
- Pete Gray (1915–2002), played major league baseball after having lost his right arm in a childhood accident; his life is depicted in the 1986 television production A Winner Never Quits
- Paul Kanjorski (b. 1937), former U.S. Representative for Pennsylvania's 11th congressional district
- Jerry Orbach (1935–2004), former cast member of Law & Order
- Frank Piekarski (1879–1951), an American football player and coach who later served as a judge in Pennsylvania
- David A. Randall (1905–1975), an American book dealer, librarian, and bibliographic scholar
- Albert Tannenbaum (1906–1976), member of Murder, Inc.
- Doug Turley (1918–1992), an American football end for the Washington Redskins
