= Middle Branch Newport Creek =

Physical characteristics
- Source
  - location: border of Glen Lyon in Newport Township, Luzerne County, Pennsylvania
  - elevation: between 720 and 740 feet (220 and 230 m)
- Mouth
  - location: Newport Creek in Newport Township, Luzerne County, Pennsylvania
  - coordinates: 41°11′00″N 76°03′17″W
  - elevation: 594 ft (181 m)
- Length: 1.1 mi (1.8 km)

Basin features
- Progression: Newport Creek → Susquehanna River → Chesapeake Bay

Middle Branch Newport Creek is a tributary of Newport Creek in Luzerne County, Pennsylvania, in the United States. It is approximately 1.1 miles (1.8 km) long and flows through Newport Township. The creek is in the United States Geological Survey quadrangle of Nanticoke. It is considered to be impaired by abandoned mine drainage for 1.1 miles (1.8 km). The creek was listed as an impaired stream in 2004.

== Course ==
Middle Branch Newport Creek begins in Newport Township, on the border of Glen Lyon. It flows east for several hundred feet before turning north-northeast for a few tenths of a mile, crossing West Kirmar Ave/East Main Street. The creek then turns northeast again for some distance and passes near a number of small ponds before turning nearly due north for several hundred feet. At this point, it leaves the border of Glen Lyon and flows northeast before briefly turning northwest and reaching its confluence with Newport Creek.

== Hydrology ==
A total of 1.1 miles (1.8 km) of Middle Branch Newport Creek are considered by the Pennsylvania Department of Environmental Protection to be impaired by pH problems due to abandoned mine drainage.

== Geology and geography ==
The elevation near the mouth of Middle Branch Newport Creek is 594 feet (181 m) above sea level. The elevation of the creek's source is between 720 and 740 feet (220 and 230 m) above sea level.

The watershed of Newport Creek, which Middle Branch Newport Creek is situated within, is located in the southwestern portion of the Wyoming Valley. The creek's mouth is at the eastern edge of a mine sheet known as Sheet II.

The mouth of Middle Branch Newport Creek was historically in Conyngham Township, approximately 300 feet (91 m) west of the Conyngham Township/Newport Township line.

Coal and slate occur along both sides of Middle Branch Newport Creek at the Shoemaker Drift.

== Watershed ==
Middle Branch Newport Creek is entirely within the United States Geological Survey quadrangle of Nanticoke. The creek is designated for use by aquatic life. Its watershed is one of several sub-watersheds in the watershed of Newport Creek. Other sub-watersheds in the watershed of Newport Creek include South Branch Newport Creek and Reservoir Creek.

The 1887 Annual Report on the Geological Survey of the State of Pennsylvania described the creek as flowing through a swamp and passing by the Miller and Uplinger farms.

== History ==
Middle Branch Newport Creek was entered into the Geographic Names Information System on January 1, 1990. Its identifier in the Geographic Names Information System is 1202398. The creek is on Patton's Philadelphia and Suburbs Street and Road Map, which was published in 1984.

Middle Branch Newport Creek was listed as an impaired stream in 2004. Its TMDL date is 2017.

== See also ==
- List of rivers of Pennsylvania
