= Newport Creek =

River in Pennsylvania, United States

Physical characteristics
- Source
  - location: Glen Lyon, Pennsylvania
- Mouth
  - location: Susquehanna River at Nanticoke, Pennsylvania
  - coordinates: 41°12′49″N 76°00′31″W
  - elevation: 510 ft (160 m)
- Length: 4.9 mi (7.9 km)
- Basin size: 13.99 mi^{2} (36.2 km^{2})
- Discharge
  - average: 2.0 cu ft/s (0.057 m^{3}/s)

Basin features
- Tributaries
  - left: Northbranch Newport Creek
  - right: Middle Branch Newport Creek, South Branch Newport Creek

Newport Creek is a tributary of the Susquehanna River in Luzerne County, Pennsylvania, in the United States. It is 4.9 miles (7.9 km) in length. Named tributaries of the creek include South Branch Newport Creek. The entire watershed of Newport Creek is considered by the Pennsylvania Department of Environmental Protection to be impaired.

== Course ==
Newport Creek begins in the community of Glen Lyon. It flows in an east-northeast direction into Luzerne County, not far from some strip mines. The creek parallels the Delaware and Hudson Railroad for some distance before turning north and then northeast to follow the railroad. The creek gets much closer to the strip mines at this point. It continues east, out of Newport Township and into the community of Nanticoke, where the tributary South Branch Newport Creek flows into Newport Creek. Newport Creek then flows through Nanticoke, passing a mountain known as Honey Pot. At this point, the creek turns north and reaches its confluence with the Susquehanna River.

=== Tributaries ===
There are several major tributaries of Newport Creek, including South Branch Newport Creek. South Branch Newport Creek's headwaters are in an area of wetland between Penobscot Mountain and Little Wilkes-Barre Mountain. Other tributaries include UNT (Note: Unnamed tributary) 28347, UNT 64681, UNT 28345, and UNT 28346. South Branch Newport Creek also has a tributary known as Reservoir Creek. Middle Branch Newport Creek is also a tributary of Newport Creek, as is North Branch Newport Creek, which has no tributaries.

== Hydrology ==
In the 1970s, Newport Creek discharged an average of 82,564 pounds (37,450 kg) of acid into the Susquehanna River. Most (68,000 pounds (31,000 kg) per day) came from North Branch Newport Creek.

At the headwaters of Newport Creek in Glen Lyon, the daily load of iron is 160.35 pounds (72.73 kg). Downstream of UNT 64681, the iron load in Newport Creek is 258.95 pounds (117.46 kg) per day and downstream of UNT 28347, the daily iron load is 88.37 pounds (40.08 kg). Downstream of the Newport Dump Discharge, the load is 1,121.72 pounds (508.80 kg) per day. Downstream of the confluence of South Branch Newport Creek with Newport Creek, there is a daily load of 1,095.07 pounds (496.72 kg) of iron. Downstream of the Susquehanna #7 Mine Discharge, the iron load is 2,735.57 pounds (1,240.83 kg) and downstream of the Honeypot Discharge, the load is 3,165.10 pounds (1,435.67 kg) per day.

At the headwaters of Newport Creek, the daily manganese load is 51.75 pounds (23.47 kg). Below UNT 64681, the load of manganese is 63.00 pounds (28.58 kg) per day and below UNT 28347 the daily load is 64.78 pounds (29.38 kg) per day. Below the Newport Dump Discharge, the manganese load is 374.68 pounds (169.95 kg) per day. Downstream of South Branch Newport Creek's confluence with Newport Creek, the daily load of manganese is 340.73 pounds (154.55 kg). Below the Susquehanna #7 Mine Discharge, the load is 556.47 pounds (252.41 kg) per day and below the Honeypot Discharge it is 733.55 pounds (332.73 kg) per day.

At Newport Creek's source, the daily load of aluminum is 91.24 pounds (41.39 kg). Downstream of UNT 64681 and UNT 28347, the daily load of aluminum is 48.844 and 64.78 pounds (22.155 and 29.384 kg), respectively. Below the Newport Dump discharge, the aluminum load is 33.48 pounds (15.19 kg). Downstream of the mouth of South Branch Newport Creek, the load is 27.84 pounds (12.63 kg) per day. Below the Susquehanna #7 Mine Discharge, the load is 32.76 pounds (14.86 kg) per day and below the Honeypot Discharge it is 93.49 pounds (42.41 kg) per day.

The concentration of dissolved oxygen at the headwaters of Newport Creek ranges from 4.7 to 110.0 milligrams per liter. The pH in this location ranges from 5.8 to 7.6 and the concentration of alkalinity ranges from 2 to 25 milligrams per liter. The concentration of sulfates ranges from 6.4 to 24 milligrams per liter. The sulfate concentration in the waters of the Newport Creek watershed was 340 parts per million in 1974.

In the South Branch Newport Creek watershed, the daily load of sediment is 3,202.40 pounds (1,452.58 kg) per day.

Upstream of South Branch Newport Creek, the discharge of Newport Creek ranges from 0.175 to 8.2 cubic feet per second, with an average of 1.8 cubic feet per second. The 25th percentile is 0.7 cubic feet per second, the 50th percentile is 2.0 cubic feet per second, and the 75th percentile is 3.9 cubic feet per second. Downstream of South Branch Newport Creek, the discharge ranges from 0.428 to 71 cubic feet per second, with an average of 5.6 cubic feet per second. The 25th percentile is 1.6 cubic feet per second, the 50th percentile is 3.0 cubic feet per second, and the 75th percentile is 5.3 cubic feet per second. Newport Creek was described as "a stream of moderate volume" in 1913.

== Geology, geography, and climate ==
The watershed of Newport Creek is in the Allegheny Mountain section of the ridge and valley geological region. The creek's headwaters are 1,080 or 1,110 feet (330 or 340 m) higher in elevation than the mouth. The lowest elevation in the watershed is 510 feet (160 m) at the creek's confluence with the Susquehanna River and the highest elevation is 1,620 feet (490 m) on Penobscot Mountain. Little Wilkes-Barre Mountain is found in the southern part of the watershed. Most of the Newport Creek watershed is in the Coal Region. There are glaciofluvial deposits from the pleistocene epoch in parts of the watershed.

Nearly all (approximately 90%) of the Newport Creek watershed is occupied by interbedded sedimentary rock. The remaining 10% is occupied by sandstone. There are at least 12 coal seams in the watershed, which are all in the Llwellyn Formation. Their thickness ranges from under 1 to 20 feet (0.30 to 6.10 m). The coal has a lower-than-average sulfur content of 0.6 to 0.8 percent.

Some areas of quicksand have been observed in the Newport Creek watershed.

The main rock formations in the Newport Creek watershed are the Llwellyn Formation, the Pottsville Formation, the Pocono Formation, the Mauch Chunk Formation, and the Duncannon Member. The Llwellyn Formation occupies much of the northern part of the watershed, including much of Newport Creek itself and some of the South Branch Newport Creek watershed, except for the southern part. South of the Llwellyn Formation is a band of the Pottsville Formation. South of the Pottsville Formation are larger areas of the Mauch Chunk Formation and the Pocono Formation. On the southern edge of the watershed is an area of the Duncannon Member. The Pottsville Formation is unusually thin (less than 100 feet (30 m) in the watershed, but is the lowest rock formation in the watershed in terms of distance below ground.

The Udorthents-Urban Land-Volusia soil association and the Lackawanna-Arnot-Morris soil association together occupy 95% of the watershed. The remaining 5% is occupied by the Wellsboro-Oquaga-Morris and the Chenango-Pope-Holly soil associations.

There are five major sources of acid mine drainage in the Newport Creek watershed. One of these is the Glen Lyon Borehole, which is located at the creek's headwaters. The Susquehanna #7 Mine Discharge, the largest source of pollution in the watershed, is 0.6 miles (0.97 km) from the mouth of the creek. It has a discharge of 4.7 to 19 cubic feet per second.

The temperature in the area of the Newport Creek watershed ranges from −3.2 °C (26.2 °F) in January to 22.3 °C (72.1 °F) in July. As of 1974, the average snowfall in the watershed is 33.3 inches (85 cm) per year. On average, 43 inches (110 cm) of rainfall in the Newport Creek watershed per year. In the watershed of South Branch Newport Creek, there is an average annual runoff of 1.03 inches (2.6 cm).

== Watershed ==
The Newport Creek watershed has an area of 13.99 square miles (36.2 km^{2}). There are 14.41 miles (23.19 km) of streams in the watershed. The watershed is bounded by the community of Nanticoke on the eastern side and the watershed of Black Creek. It is up to 6.5 miles (10.5 km) long from east to west and up to 3.5 miles (5.6 km) long from north to south.

Communities in the Newport Creek watershed include Alden, Glen Lyon, Nanticoke, Newport Center, Sheatown, and Wanamie. Wilkes-Barre is 9 miles (14 km) northeast of the watershed and Hazleton is 15 miles (24 km) south of the watershed. Pennsylvania State Route 3002 and a number of township roads are found in the watershed. The creek drains much of a coal sheet known as Sheet No. 2. Its tributaries drain part of the coal sheet Mine Sheet No. 1.

Much of the Newport Creek watershed is forested. However, there are significant areas of developed land in the eastern part of the watershed. Other land uses in the watershed area agricultural and disturbed land.

The headwaters of the Newport Creek watershed are on Penobscot Mountain and Little Wilkes-Barre Mountain. Newport Lake, a 20-acre (8.1 ha) lake of mine drainage, is in the creek's watershed. Fairchild Pond and the Wanamie Reservoir are also present in the sub-watershed of South Branch Newport Creek. Najaka Pond and Kielar Lake used to drain into Newport Creek or its tributaries, but mining in the watershed has intercepted their discharge.

== History ==
The Bloomery Forge was built on Newport Creek some time before January 1777 by Nathaniel Chapman, Joseph Beach, and Chris Alden. A stone bridge was once built over Newport Creek near the location of an old mill. A person named Chapman constructed a mill on the creek, which was eventually replaced with one built by William Jackson. For a number of years, Jackson's mill was the only mill in Newport Township.

Coal mining began in the Newport Creek watershed in the middle of the 1800s, with deep mines being established in this period. A mine disaster occurred on the creek near Nanticoke on November 18, 1885. The mines were most active in the 1920s and in 1924, 35 million tons were produced. The production rate dropped slightly after the 1920s and entered a steady decline in the 1950s. Strip mines were established in the watershed in the middle of the 1900s. Deep mining in the watershed ended in the 1950s, but strip mining continues in the 21st century. Much of the watershed has been mined.

== Biology ==
Coliform bacteria have been observed in the waters of Newport Creek.

== See also ==
- Shickshinny Creek
- Solomon Creek
- List of rivers of Pennsylvania
