= Reservoir Creek =

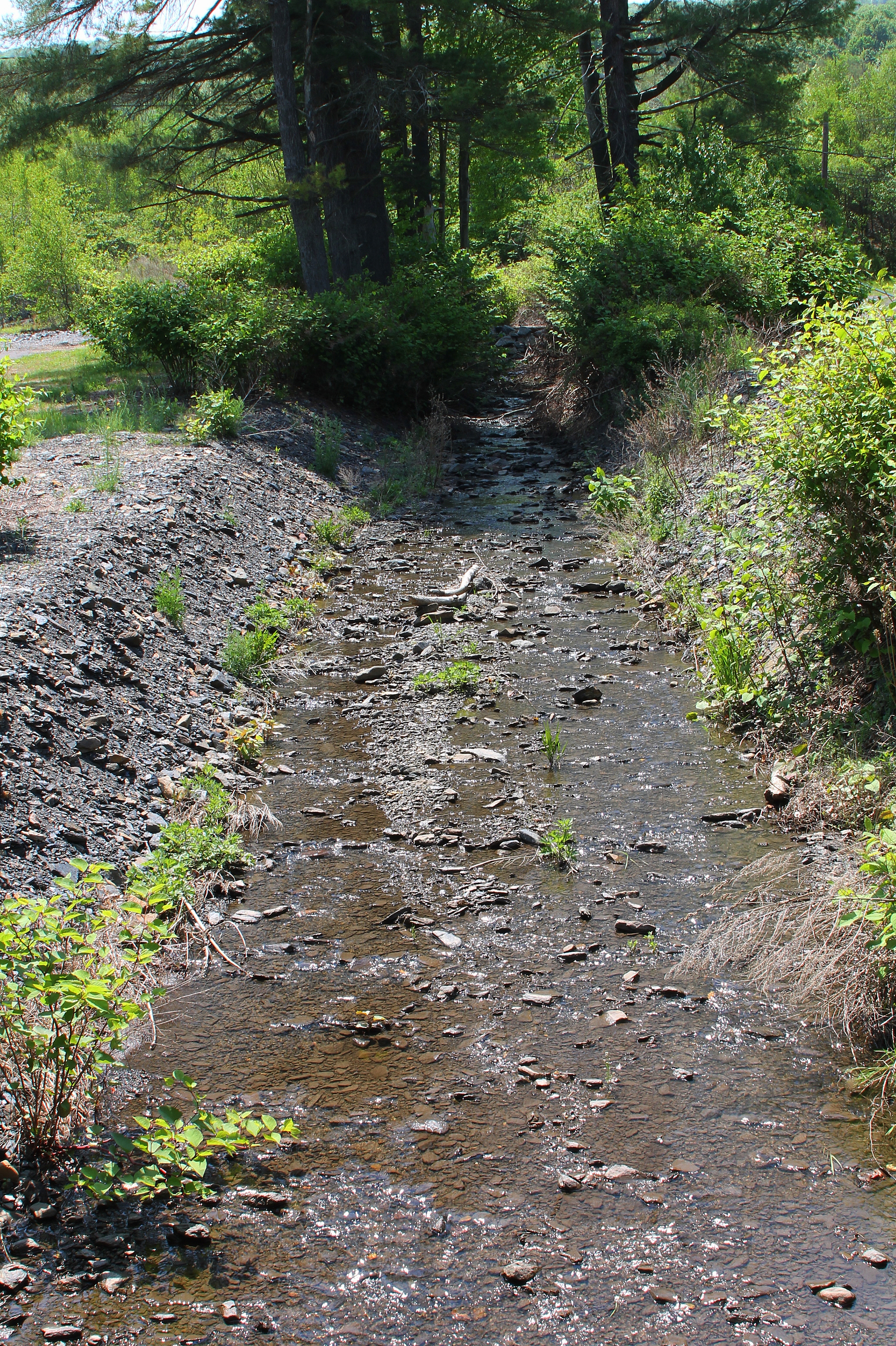
- Reservoir Creek looking upstream in its lower reaches

Physical characteristics
- Source
  - location: valley on Little Wilkes-Barre Mountain in Newport Township, Pennsylvania
  - elevation: between 1,000 and 1,020 feet (300 and 310 m)
- Mouth
  - location: South Branch Newport Creek in Newport Township, Pennsylvania
  - coordinates: 41°10′37″N 76°01′41″W
  - elevation: 643 ft (196 m)
- Length: 1.6 mi (2.6 km)

Basin features
- Progression: South Branch Newport Creek → Newport Creek → Susquehanna River → Chesapeake Bay

Reservoir Creek is a tributary of South Branch Newport Creek in Luzerne County, Pennsylvania, in the United States. It is approximately 1.6 miles (2.6 km) long and flows through Newport Township. The creek is in the United States Geological Survey quadrangle of Nanticoke. Most of the land in its vicinity is forested land, but there are also some patches of developed land, agricultural land, and "disturbed" land. The main rock formations in the watershed are the Llwellyn Formation, the Mauch Chunk Formation, the Pottsville Formation, and the Pocono Formation. The main soils are the Lackawanna-Arnot-Morris series and the Udorthents-Urban Land-Volusia series. The creek is considered by the Pennsylvania Department of Environmental Protection to be impaired.

== Course ==
Reservoir Creek begins in a valley on Little Wilkes-Barre Mountain in Newport Township. It flows east for several tenths of a mile before entering a pond and turning north. After several tenths of a mile, the creek leaves Little Wilkes-Barre Mountain and turns north-northwest, flowing along the border of Wanamie. After a short distance, it turns north and reaches its confluence with South Branch Newport Creek.

== Hydrology ==
The entire length of Reservoir Creek is considered by the Pennsylvania Department of Environmental Protection to be impaired by abandoned mine drainage due to pH and siltation.

== Geography and geology ==
The elevation near the mouth of Reservoir Creek is 643 feet (196 m) above sea level. The elevation of the creek's source is between 1,000 and 1,020 feet (300 and 310 m) above sea level.

The lower reaches of Reservoir Creek are on rock of the Llwellyn Formation. Further upstream, there is a thin band of Pottsville Formation. The creek's upper reaches are on rock of the Mauch Chunk Formation. Just south of its upper reaches is an area of rock of the Pocono Formation. The lower reaches of Reservoir Creek are on soil of the Udorthents-Urban Land-Volusia series. However, the creek's upper reaches are on soil of the Lackawanna-Arnot-Morris series.

At some point in the past, the course of Reservoir Creek was altered from its original course.

A portion of Little Wilkes-Barre Mountain is in the watershed of Reservoir Creek.

== Watershed ==
Reservoir Creek is entirely within the United States Geological Survey quadrangle of Nanticoke.

Most of the land in the vicinity of Reservoir Creek is forested land. However, there are some small patches of agricultural land and "disturbed" land. Some developed land is present in the village of Wanamie, not far from the creek's mouth.

A portion of Reservoir Creek is within a 300-acre tract of land protected by the North Branch Land Trust. It mainly contains a forest of hardwood trees and softwood conifers.

A reservoir known as the Wanamie Reservoir was located on Reservoir Creek. Historically, it was dammed by the Wanamie Dam and had an area of 15 to 20 acres. However, the dam was removed in 2007 for safety reasons and the reservoir was drained in the same year. The remains of the dam can still be found in the area.

== History ==
Reservoir Creek was entered into the Geographic Names Information System on August 1, 1989. Its identifier in the Geographic Names Information System is 1212408.

Coal mining has been done in the vicinity of Reservoir Creek in the past.

In 2014, the Pennsylvania Department of Environmental Protection requested $114 million from the Abandoned Mine Land Program for a series of abandoned mine-related projects. One such project involved rerouting a section of Reservoir Creek away from areas at risk of flooding and closing several mine openings in the area. This project takes place on a 42-acre tract of land and is estimated to cost less than $1,000,000. A 1320-foot stretch of the creek is to be relocated to a more stable channel and the old unstable channel is to be filled in.

== See also ==
- List of rivers of Pennsylvania
