= South Branch Newport Creek =

Tributary of Newport Creek in Luzerne County, Pennsylvania

Coordinates: 41°12′10″N 76°00′48″W

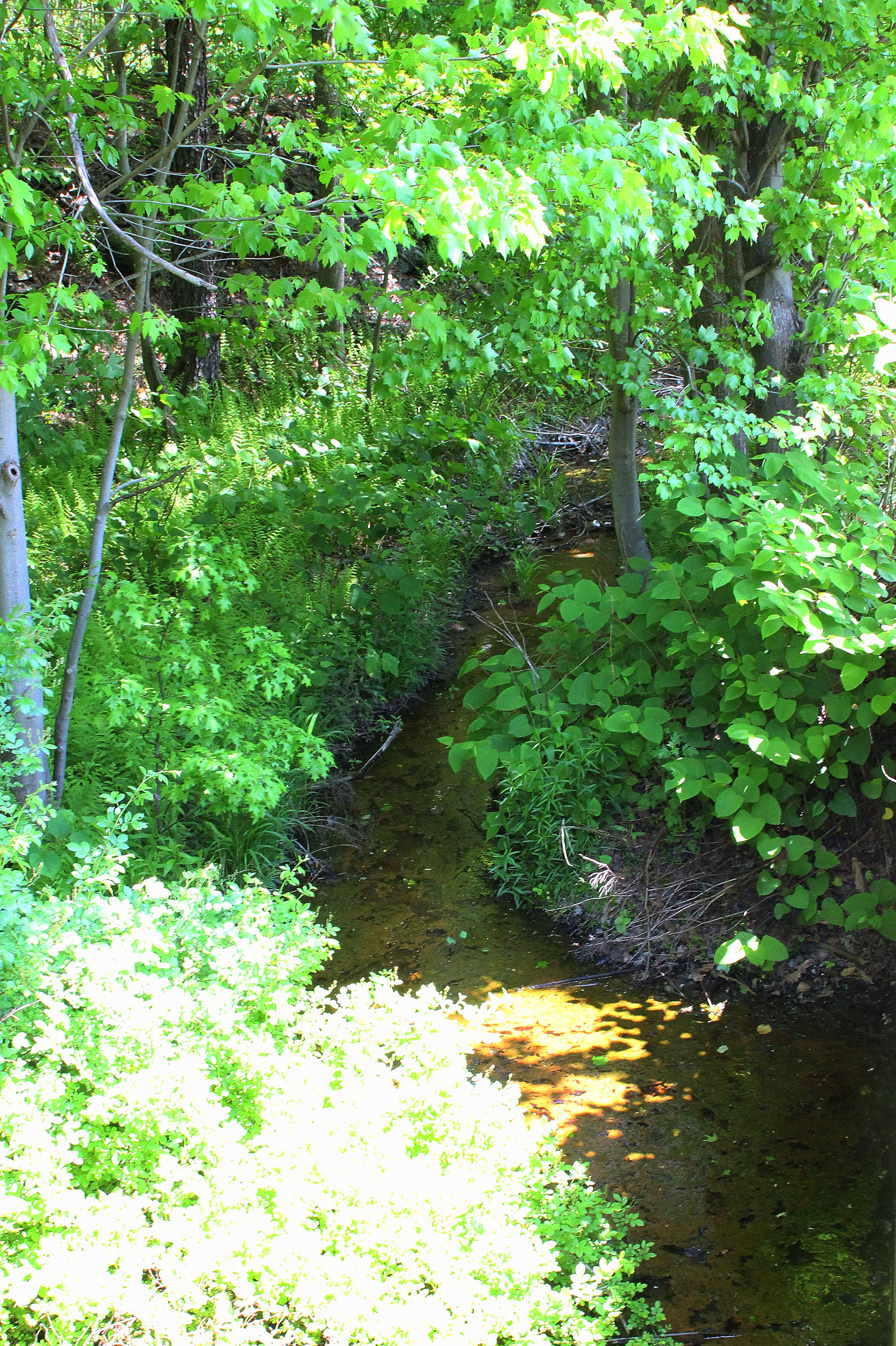
South Branch Newport Creek looking downstream

South Branch Newport Creek is a tributary of Newport Creek in Luzerne County, Pennsylvania, in the United States. It is 3.6 miles (5.8 km) long. The entire watershed of the creek is considered by the Pennsylvania Department of Environmental Protection to be impaired. Mining has also been done in the watershed.

== Course ==
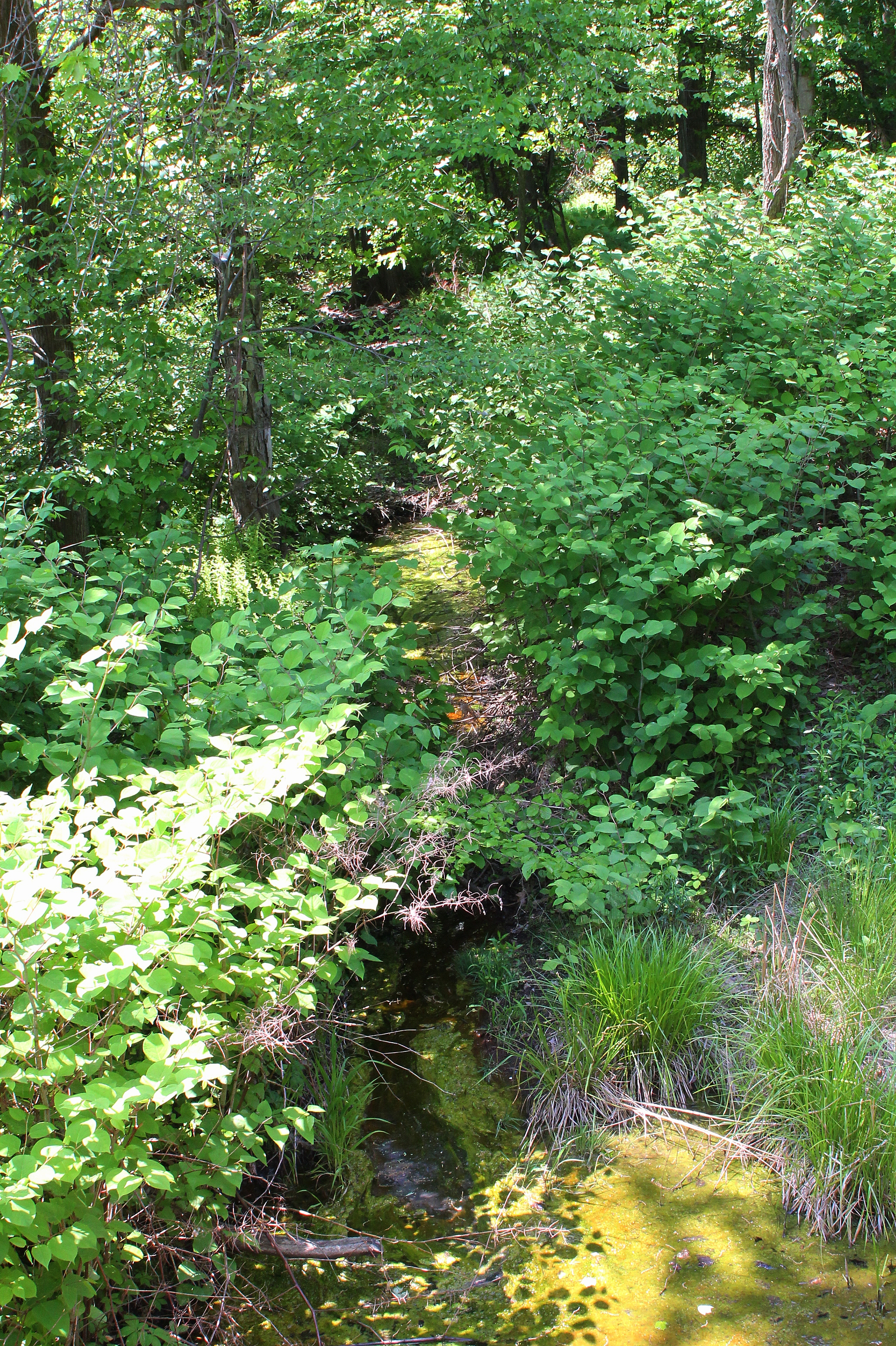
South Branch Newport Creek looking upstream

South Branch Newport Creek begins in strip mines near the community of Wanamie in Newport Township. The headwaters are located north of Penobscot Mountain. The creek flows east for some distance before gradually turning north slightly west of the community of Alden. It then flows into the western part of Nanticoke, where it joins Newport Creek.

=== Tributaries ===
South Branch Newport Creek has one named tributary, which is known as Reservoir Creek. It also has an unnamed tributary.

== Hydrology ==
At the headwaters of South Branch Newport Creek, the daily load of iron is 0.07 pounds (0.032 kg). The concentration of iron at this location is 0.26 milligrams per liter. Downstream of UNT (Note: Unnamed tributary) 28346, the daily iron load is 16.81 pounds (7.62 kg) per day and the concentration is 3.34 milligrams per liter. Downstream of the Sheatown Discharge, the load of iron is 40.96 pounds (18.58 kg) per day (with a concentration of 4.62 milligrams per liter) and upstream of the mouth, the load is 13.32 pounds (6.04 kg) per day, where the concentration of iron is 1.11 milligrams per liter.

At South Branch Newport Creek's headwaters, the manganese load is 0.45 pounds (0.20 kg) per day. The concentration at this location is 1.61 milligrams per liter. Downstream of UNT 28346, the daily manganese load is 10.77 pounds (4.89 kg), with a concentration of 2.14 milligrams per liter and downstream of the Sheatown Discharge, the load is 19.69 pounds (8.93 kg) per day. The manganese concentration downstream of the Sheatown Discharge is 2.22 milligrams per liter. Upstream of the creek's mouth, the daily load is 26.65 pounds (12.09 kg), where the concentration is 2.23 milligrams per liter.

The daily aluminum load at the headwaters of South Branch Newport Creek is 0.56 pounds (0.25 kg). The concentration of aluminum at this location is 2.00 milligrams per liter. The load is 22.82 pounds (10.35 kg) per day downstream of UNT 28346, with a concentration of 4.53 milligrams per liter and 30.00 pounds (13.61 kg) daily downstream of the Sheatown Discharge, with a concentration of 3.38 milligrams per liter there. The daily aluminum load is 13.04 pounds (5.91 kg) upstream of the creek's mouth, where the concentration is 1.09 milligrams per liter.

The daily load of acidity at the headwaters of South Branch Newport Creek is 9.43 pounds (4.28 kg). The concentration of acidity at this location is 33.80 milligrams per liter. Downstream of UNT 28346, the daily load of acidity is 314.40 pounds (142.61 kg), with the concentration being 62.47 milligrams per liter and downstream of the Sheatown Discharge, the load is 377.36 pounds (171.17 kg) per day, with a concentration of 42.57 milligrams per liter there. Upstream of the mouth of the creek, the daily load of acidity is 166.56 pounds (75.55 kg), where the acidity concentration is 13.93 milligrams per liter.

The concentration of alkalinity at the headwaters of South Branch Newport Creek is 2.3 milligrams per liter and the load is 0.64 pounds (0.29 kg) per day. The alkalinity concentration upstream of the creek's mouth is 9.1 milligrams per liter and the daily load is 108.78 pounds (49.34 kg).

There is a daily sediment load of 2,936.489 pounds (1,331.969 kg) in the South Branch Newport Creek watershed. 1,512.712 pounds (686.155 kg) per day comes from hay or pastures. 447.507 pounds (202.986 kg) per day comes from forests, 439.284 pounds (199.256 kg) per day comes from stream banks, 285.151 pounds (129.342 kg) per day comes from land classified by the Pennsylvania Department of Environmental Protection as "transition", and 116.822 pounds (52.990 kg) per day comes from coal mines. 80.767 pounds (36.635 kg) of sediment per day comes from land classified by the Pennsylvania Department of Environmental Protection as "low-intensity development", 40.767 pounds (18.492 kg) per day comes from land classified by the Pennsylvania Department of Environmental Protection as "high-intensity development", and 12.986 pounds (5.890 kg) comes from croplands. 0.493 pounds (0.224 kg) of sediment from wetlands flows into South Branch Newport Creek each day.

The discharge of South Branch Newport Creek at its headwaters ranges from 0.010 to 0.133 cubic feet per second, with an average of 0.052 cubic feet per second. The discharge of the creek downstream of UNT 28346 ranges from 0.085 to 2.276 cubic feet per second and the average discharge is 0.933 cubic feet per second. Below the Sheatown Discharge, it ranges from 0.127 to 4.492 cubic feet per second, with an average of 1.644 cubic feet per second. Above the mouth, it ranges from 0.424 to 5.284 cubic feet per second and the average is 2.216 cubic feet per second.

== Geology, geography, and climate ==
South Branch Newport Creek is entirely in the ridge and valley geographical region of the Appalachian Mountains. The southern part of the watershed is on Little Wilkes-Barre Mountain.

79 percent of the rock in the watershed of South Branch Newport Creek belongs to the Llwellyn Formation. 7 percent belongs to the Pottsville Group, 7 percent belongs to the Mauch Chunk Formation, and 7 percent belongs to the Pocono Formation. 70 percent of the soil in the watershed is of the Udorthents-Urban Land-Volusia series. The remaining 30 percent belongs to the Lackawanna-Arnot-Morris series.

The Llwellyn Formation occupies all of the northern and central reaches of the South Branch Newport Creek watershed. South of the Llwellyn Formation is the Pottsville Formation. South of the Pottsville Formation is the Mauch Chunk Formation and then the Pocono Formation. The southernmost reaches of the watershed are occupied by rock of the Duncannon Member formation. The area near the mouth of the creek, it flows over a coal sheet called Sheet III. South of the middle reaches of the tributary Reservoir Creek, all of the soil belongs to the Lackawanna-Arnot-Morris series. North of this area, the soil all belongs to the Udorthents-Urban Land-Volusia series.

There is some drift on the banks of South Branch Newport Creek, but not as much as on Newport Creek itself.

The average annual rainfall in the South Branch Newport Creek watershed is 43.5 inches (110 cm). The average runoff is 1.03 inches (2.6 cm) per year.

== Watershed ==
South Branch Newport Creek's watershed has an area of 5.05 square miles. 58 percent of the land is forested land, 28 percent is developed land, 13 percent is agricultural land, and 1 percent of the land is in other categories. Most of the watershed is in Newport Township and Nanticoke, but the southwestern edge of the watershed is on the border between Newport Township and Slocum Township.

Most of the developed land in the South Branch Newport Creek watershed is in the central part of the watershed, around the community of Wanamie or in the northeast part of the watershed, in Nanticoke. Forested land is found throughout the watershed, except for the northeast part. Agricultural land is mostly found in the central part of the watershed and disturbed land is mostly found in the western reaches of it.

The headwaters of South Branch Newport Creek can be accessed by State Route 3004.

In the late 1800s, there was a swamp at the headwaters of South Branch Newport Creek.

== History ==
In 1874, there was a large release of quicksand at the Alden shaft on South Branch Newport Creek. Several collieries discharged into South Branch Newport Creek in the early 1900s.

== See also ==
- List of rivers of Pennsylvania
