= State Correctional Institution – Retreat =

Former prison in Pennsylvania, United States

Coordinates: 41°11′16″N 76°04′51″W

State Correctional Institution Retreat
- Interactive map of State Correctional Institution Retreat
- Location: Newport Township, Luzerne County, near Glen Lyon, Pennsylvania
- Security class: Medium-Security
- Capacity: 1,200
- Opened: 1986
- Closed: June 2020
- Managed by: Pennsylvania Department of Corrections

State Correctional Institution – Retreat is a former 350-bed Medium-Security correctional facility for males. Located on the site of the former Retreat State Hospital, the facility is located about 12 miles south of Wilkes-Barre in the northeastern part of the commonwealth of Pennsylvania.

== Opening of SCI Retreat ==
Opening of SCI-Retreat was the result of the commonwealth's overcrowding issue of the 1980s. The Retreat State Hospital was declining in patients and was closed in 1981 and planning for SCI-Retreat's conversion began. Similar conversions were made at Cresson Center (Now SCI-Cresson) and the former Waynesburg Youth Development Center (Was SCI-Waynesburg from 1985 to 2004). Retreat was the first correctional facility built since 1960. The correctional facility opened in 1986.

== See also ==
- List of Pennsylvania state prisons
