= St. Stanislaus Institute =

Former orphanage in Pennsylvania, US

- U.S. National Register of Historic Places
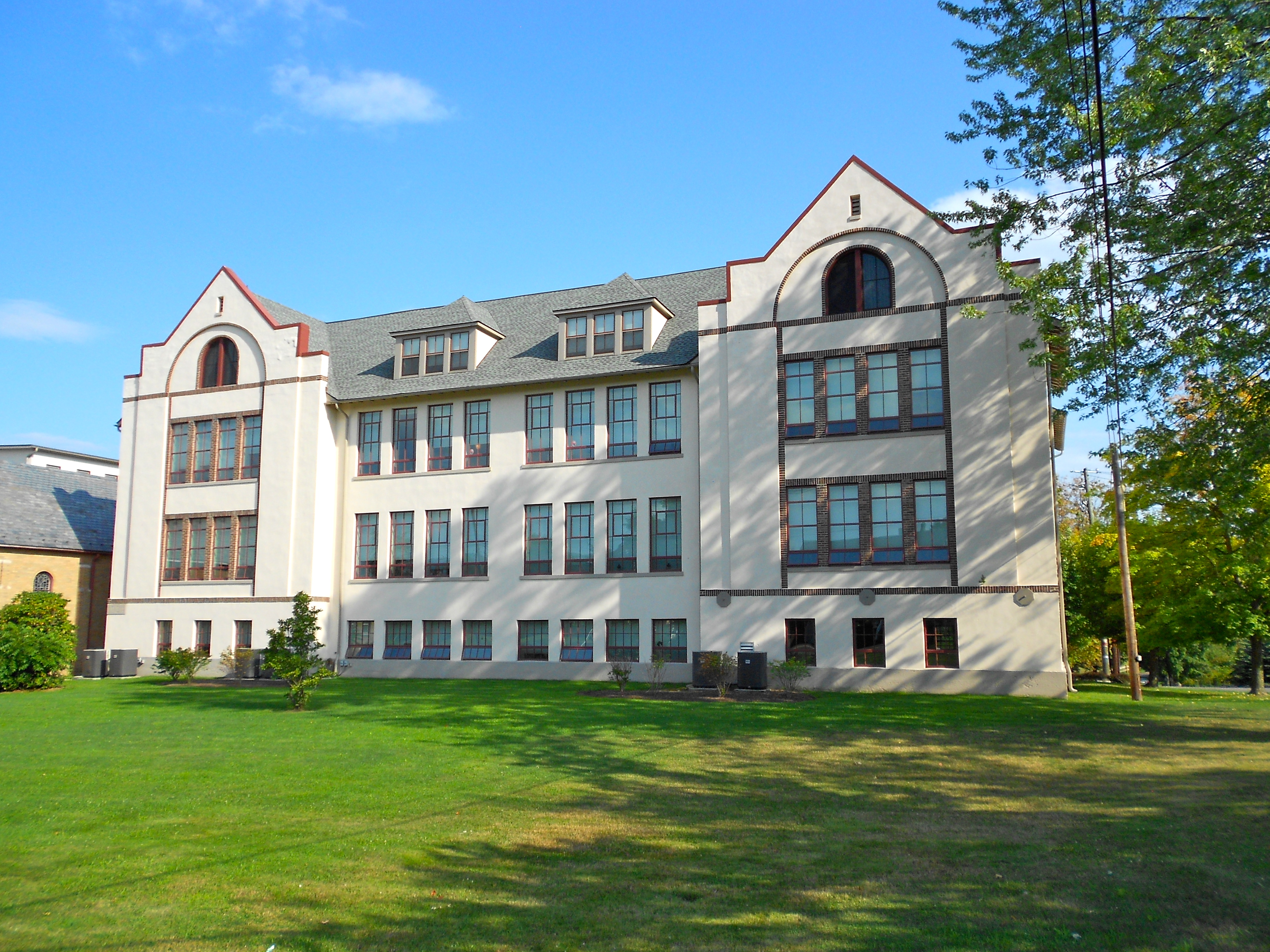
- Dormitory

- Location within Pennsylvania Location within the United States
- Location: 141 Old Newport St., Newport Township, Pennsylvania
- Coordinates: 41°11′32″N 76°01′03″W
- Area: 4.1 acres (1.7 ha)
- Built: 1918
- Architect: Prawdzik, Alexander, I.; et al.
- Architectural style: Mission/Spanish Revival, Modern Movement
- NRHP reference No.: 08001267
- Added to NRHP: December 30, 2008

St. Stanislaus Institute, also known as St. Stanislaus Orphanage and Holy Child Church, is a historic former Catholic orphanage complex located at 141 Old Newport Street in Newport Township, Luzerne County, Pennsylvania within the Diocese of Scranton.

It was added to the National Register of Historic Places in 2008.

== Description ==
The complex consists of three interconnected and three independent buildings built between 1918 and 1939, built originally for use as an orphanage for Polish children. They are the Spanish Revival style boys dormitory (1918), Holy Child chapel (1939), laundry/boiler building, and rectory and garage. The facility closed in 1972.

== Gallery ==
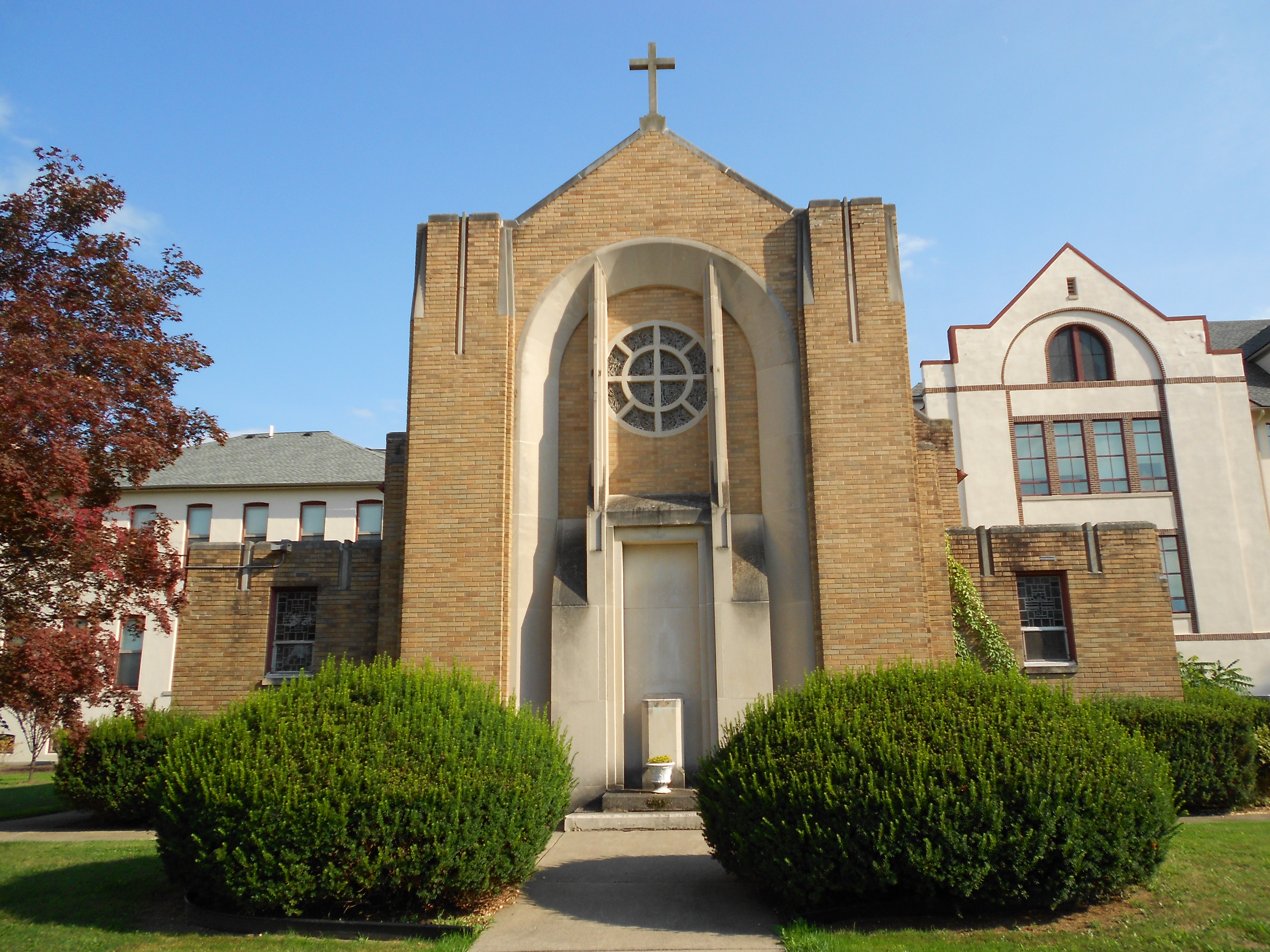
Chapel

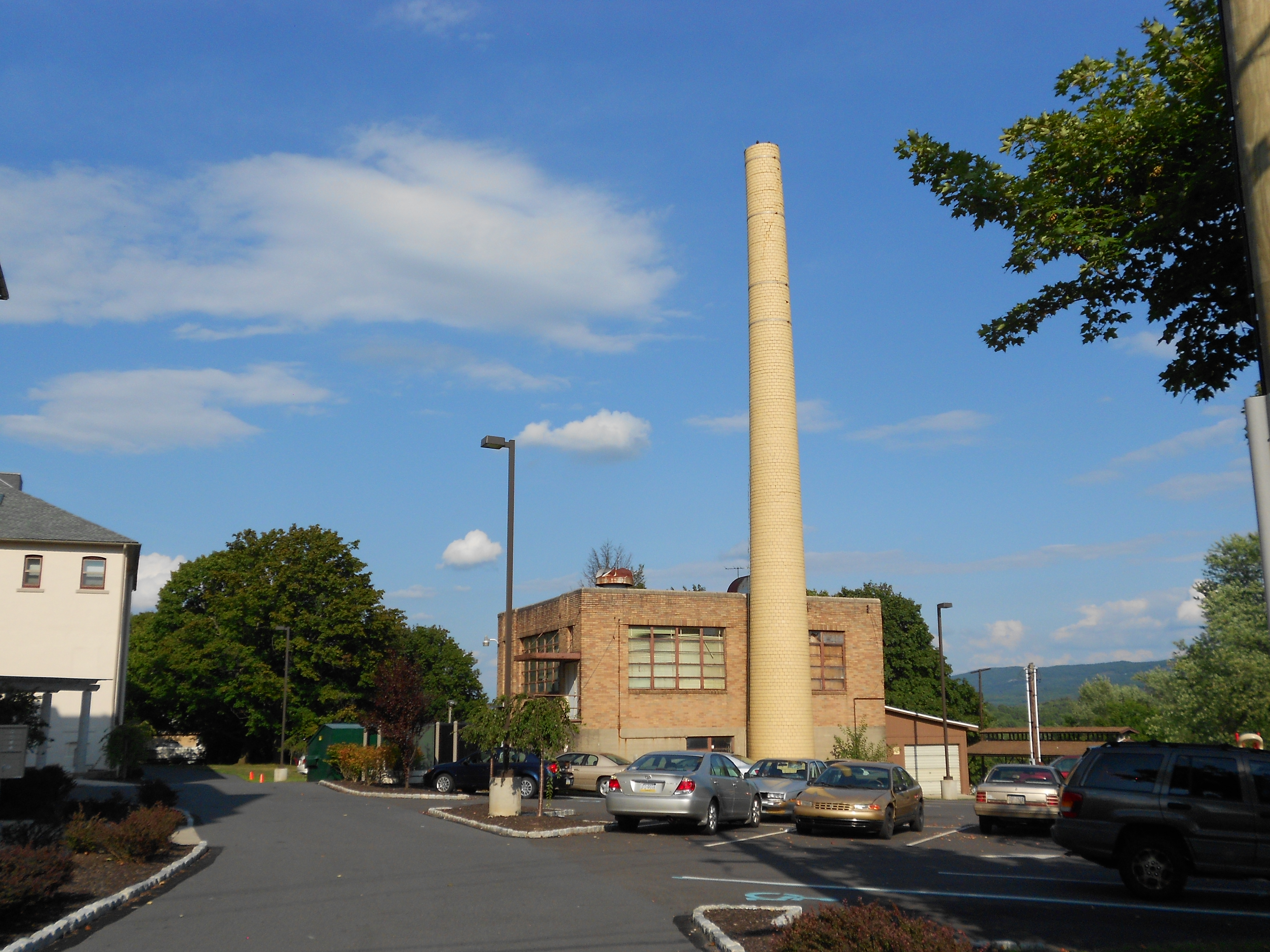
Boiler building
