= Tess Gardella =

American actress (1894–1950)

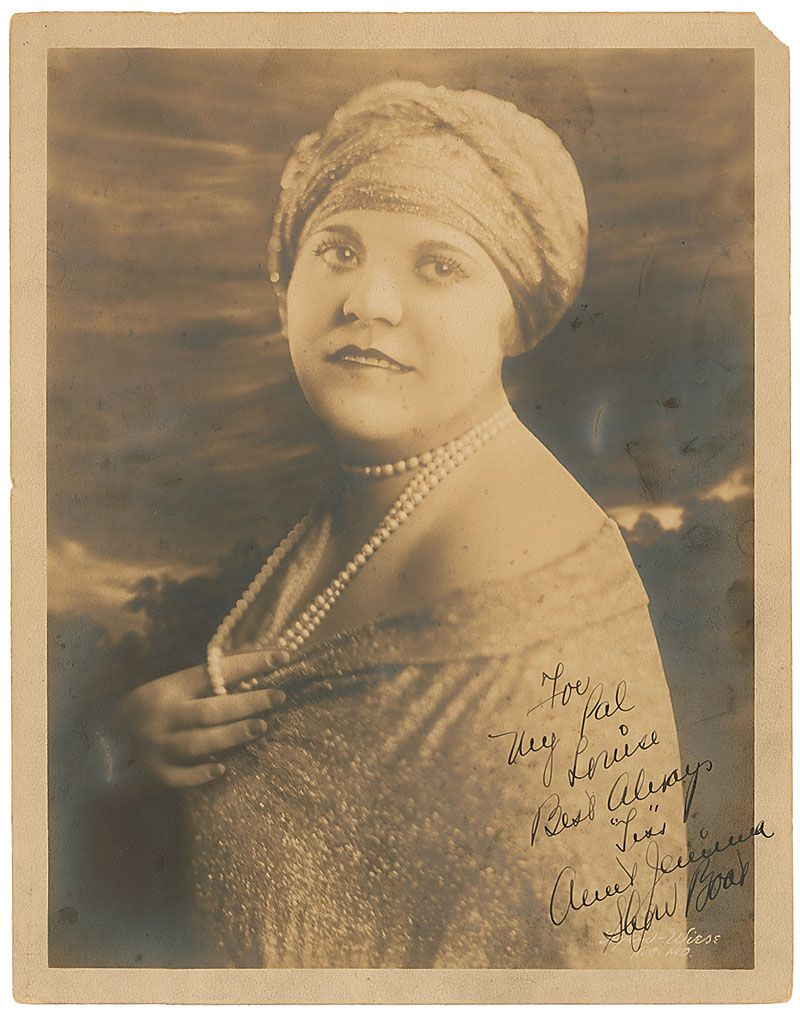
- Tess Gardella (1894-1950), stage name "Aunt Jemima"
- Born: Therese Gardella; December 19, 1894; Glen Lyon, Pennsylvania
- Died: January 3, 1950 (aged 55); Brooklyn, New York
- Other name: "Aunt Jemima"
- Occupations: singer, dancer, actress
- Known for: blackface; original "Queenie" in Showboat

Therese Gardella (December 19, 1894 – January 3, 1950) was an American performer on the stage and screen whose stage persona was Aunt Jemima. She was of Italian descent. She performed on both stage and screen, usually in blackface. Tess was born in Glen Lyon, Pennsylvania, to John and Louisa Gardella. She came to New York City in 1918, singing in dance halls and nightclubs and also political rallies.

She died of diabetes in Brooklyn, New York, on January 3, 1950.

== Vaudeville ==
She was introduced to the vaudeville stage by Lew Leslie, who gave her the stage name of Aunt Jemima. She appeared at the Palace and the New York Hippodrome, and attracted very favorable reviews from Variety.

For her final performance, she returned to vaudeville, playing the Palace once more in 1949.

== Theater ==
Gardella's first performance in the legitimate theater was in the 1921 version of George White's Scandals. But she was best known for her role in the classic stage musical Show Boat in 1927, in which she originated the role of Queenie. The show featured an African-American chorus and cast, including Jules Bledsoe (in the role of Joe) who made "Ol' Man River" an American classic. The exception was Gardella, who played her role in blackface. She remained through the entire original run of the show, which ended in May 1929. She also returned for a 1932 Broadway revival that reunited most of the original 1927 cast. After Show Boat, Gardella returned to the vaudeville stage.

== Film ==
During the 1930s, Gardella appeared in occasional movie shorts filmed in New York, including the Vitaphone series Rambling 'Round Radio Row (1932–34). She appeared in the film that made Shirley Temple a star, Stand Up and Cheer! (1934). She was usually billed as "Aunt Jemima".

In 1938, the Vitaphone studio starred her as "Tess Gardella (Aunt Jemima)" in the two-reel musical short A Swing Opera. In this updated condensation of the famous operetta The Bohemian Girl, with special lyrics by Sammy Cahn and Saul Chaplin, Gardella was top-billed as the gypsy queen and does not wear blackface.

Billboard summed up her appeal as the personification of the "colored mammy."

== See also ==
- Nancy Green
