= Sheatown, Pennsylvania =

Unincorporated community in Pennsylvania, US

- Census-designated place
- Location in Pennsylvania Location in the United States
- Coordinates: 41°11′36″N 76°0′52″W
- Country: United States
- State: Pennsylvania
- County: Luzerne
- Township: Newport

Area
  - Total: 0.50 sq mi (1.3 km^{2})
  - Land: 0.50 sq mi (1.3 km^{2})
  - Water: 0 sq mi (0 km^{2})

Population (2010)
  - Total: 671
  - Density: 1,300/sq mi (520/km^{2})
- Time zone: UTC-5 (Eastern (EST))
  - Summer (DST): UTC-4 (EDT)
- ZIP code: 18634
- Area code: 570

Sheatown is a census-designated place (CDP) in Newport Township, Pennsylvania, United States. It is adjacent to the west side of the city of Nanticoke. The population of Sheatown was 671 at the 2010 census.

== Geography ==
Sheatown is located at 41°11′36″N 76°0′52″W. It is directly west of the city of Nanticoke.

According to the United States Census Bureau, the CDP has a total area of 0.50 square miles (1.3 km^{2}), all land.

== Education ==
The school district is Greater Nanticoke Area School District.
