= Bob Duliba =

American baseball player (1935–2026)

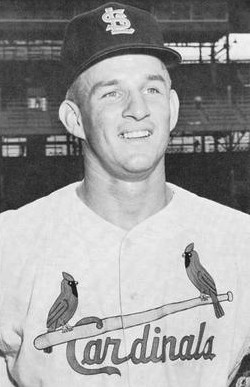
- Duliba in 1962
- Pitcher
- Born: January 9, 1935; Glen Lyon, Pennsylvania, U.S.
- Died: April 4, 2026 (aged 91); Wilkes-Barre, Pennsylvania, U.S.
- Batted: Right Threw: Right

MLB debut
- August 11, 1959, for the St. Louis Cardinals

Last MLB appearance
- May 9, 1967, for the Kansas City Athletics

MLB statistics
- Win–loss record: 17–12
- Earned run average: 3.47
- Strikeouts: 129
- Stats at Baseball Reference

Teams
- St. Louis Cardinals (1959–1960, 1962); Los Angeles Angels (1963–1964); Boston Red Sox (1965); Kansas City Athletics (1967)

Robert John Duliba (January 9, 1935 – April 4, 2026) was an American professional baseball relief pitcher. The 5 ft 10 in (1.78 m), 185 lb (84 kg) right-hander played in Major League Baseball (MLB) for the St. Louis Cardinals (1959–60, 1962), Los Angeles Angels (1963–1964), Boston Red Sox (1965) and Kansas City Athletics (1967).

== Biography ==
Duliba was born into a coal mining family in Glen Lyon, Pennsylvania, on January 9, 1935.

Duliba made his major league debut on August 11, 1959, against the San Francisco Giants at Busch Stadium. He pitched two scoreless innings in the 5–4 Cardinal loss. Duliba struck out one batter, outfielder Jackie Brandt. He earned his first big league save eighteen days later in a home game against the Cincinnati Reds.

After relieving in 28 games with a 2.06 earned run average for the Cardinals in 1962, he was traded to the Los Angeles Angels for relief pitcher Bob Botz. In 1964, Duliba had his busiest season, finishing in the American League top ten in games pitched (58) and games finished (35). He was 6–4 with nine saves and an ERA of 3.59 for the Angels that season.

Traded to the Boston organization the following spring, Duliba appeared in 39 games for the 1965 Red Sox and led the team's pitching staff in earned run average (3.17). Duliba closed out his major league career with the A's in 1967, their last season in Kansas City.

Career totals include 176 games pitched, all in relief, a 17–12 record, 93 games finished, and 14 saves. In 257 innings pitched he allowed 257 hits and 96 walks for a WHIP of 1.374. He struck out 129 and had an earned run average of 3.47.

After his professional playing career, Duliba taught history and coached baseball in the Wyoming Area School District in Luzerne County, Pennsylvania. He also coached baseball on the collegiate level at Wilkes University.

Duliba died on April 4, 2026, at the age of 91.
