= Wanamie, Pennsylvania =

Unincorporated community in Pennsylvania, US

- Census-designated place
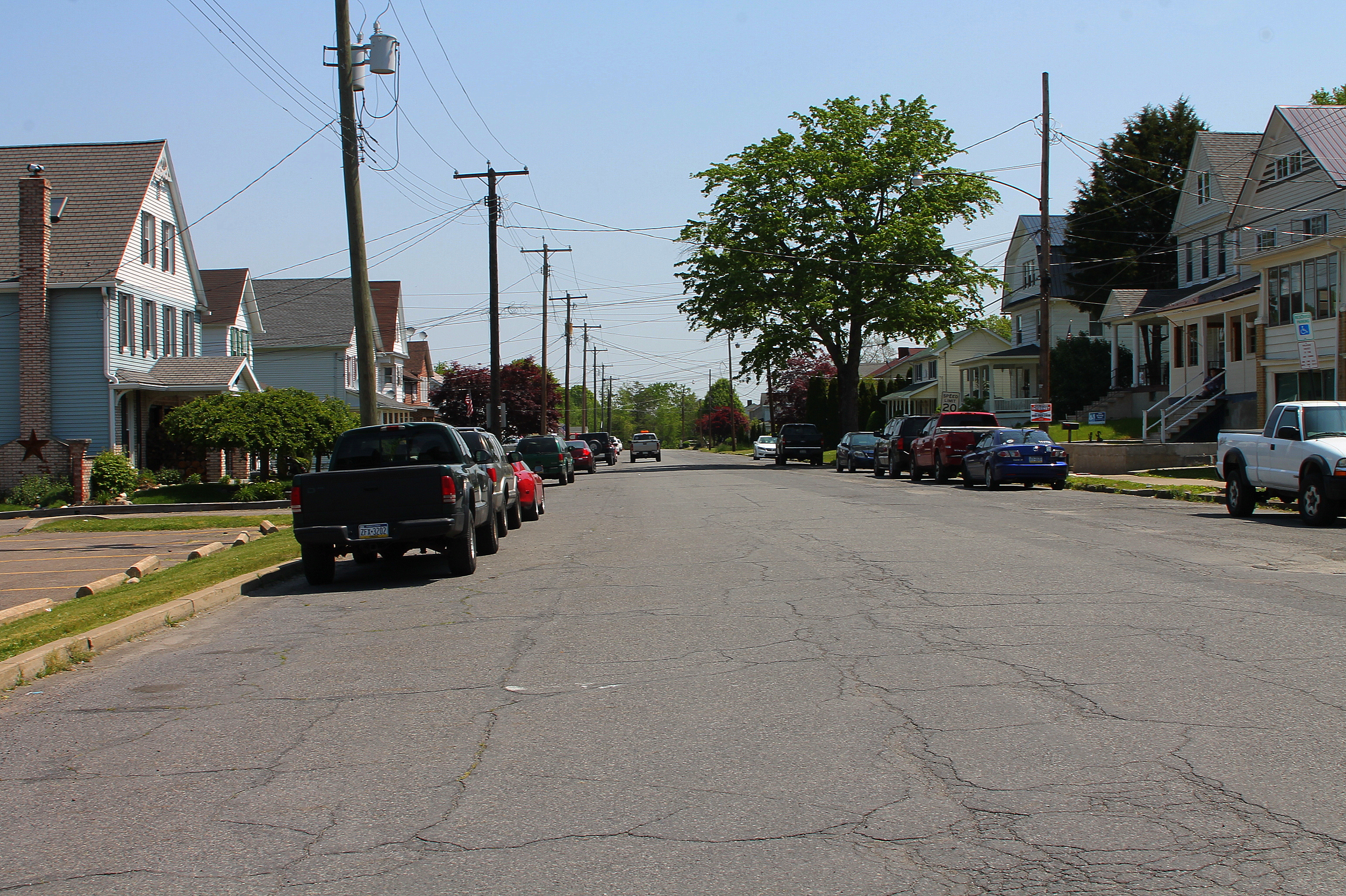
- Street in Wanamie

- Location in Pennsylvania Location in the United States
- Coordinates: 41°10′24″N 76°02′08″W
- Country: United States
- State: Pennsylvania
- County: Luzerne
- Township: Newport

Area
  - Total: 0.981 sq mi (2.54 km^{2})
  - Land: 0.981 sq mi (2.54 km^{2})
  - Water: 0 sq mi (0 km^{2})
- Elevation: 676 ft (206 m)

Population (2010)
  - Total: 612
  - Density: 624/sq mi (241/km^{2})
- Time zone: UTC-5 (Eastern (EST))
  - Summer (DST): UTC-4 (EDT)
- Area code: 570
- GNIS feature ID: 1190577

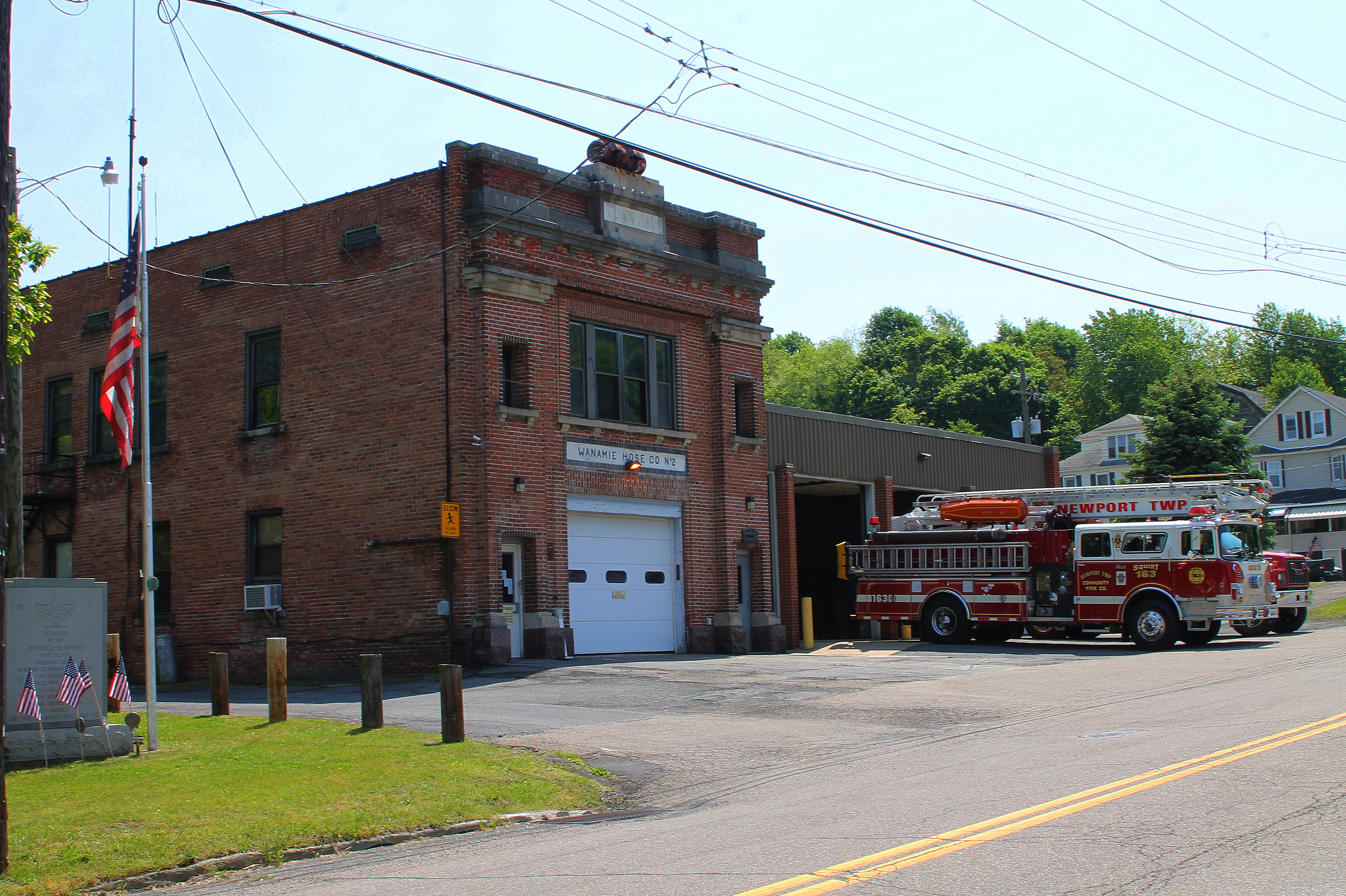
Fire station in Wanamie

Wanamie is an unincorporated community and census-designated place in Newport Township, Pennsylvania. It is located in the southwestern end of the Wyoming Valley and uses the Nanticoke zip code of 18634. The South Branch Newport Creek forms the natural eastern boundary of Wanamie and drains it northeastward via the Newport Creek into the Susquehanna River. The village is named after the Wanami tribe of the Lenni Lenape. As of the 2010 census, its population was 612.

== Education ==
The school district is Greater Nanticoke Area School District.
