= Alden, Pennsylvania =

Unincorporated community in Pennsylvania, US

- Unincorporated community
- Location within Pennsylvania Location within the United States
- Coordinates: 41°10′55″N 76°0′45″W
- Country: United States
- State: Pennsylvania
- County: Luzerne
- Township: Newport
- Elevation: 627 ft (191 m)
- Time zone: UTC-5 (Eastern (EST))
  - Summer (DST): UTC-4 (EDT)
- Area codes: 570 and 272
- GNIS feature ID: 1168126

Alden is an unincorporated community in Newport Township in Luzerne County, Pennsylvania, United States. Alden is located at the intersection of Kirmar Avenue, Alden Mountain Road, and Robert Street, southwest of Nanticoke.
