= Glen Lyon, Pennsylvania =

Unincorporated community in Pennsylvania, US

- Census-designated place
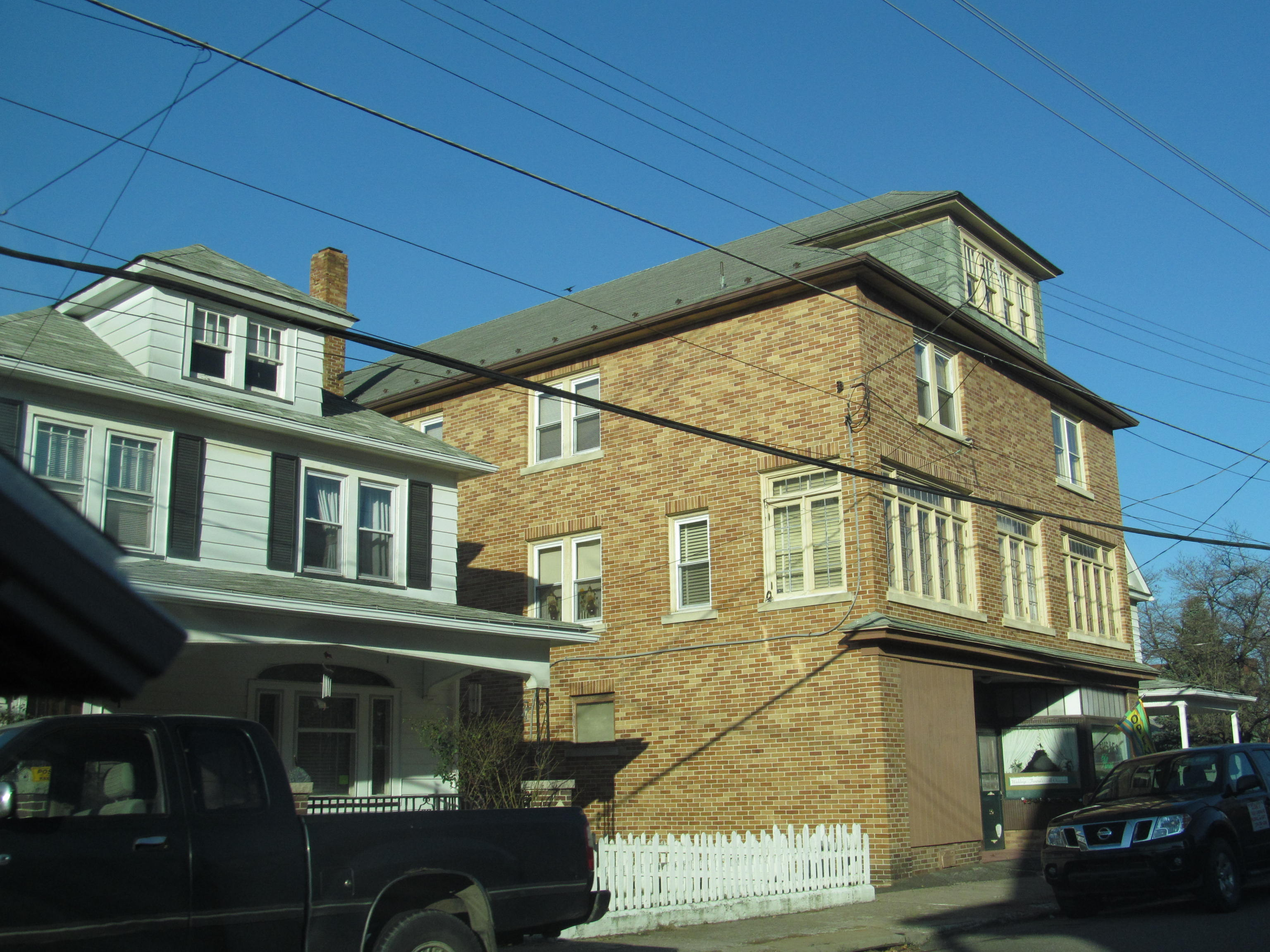
- Houses in Glen Lyon

- Location in Pennsylvania Location in the United States
- Coordinates: 41°10′32″N 76°4′28″W
- Country: United States
- State: Pennsylvania
- County: Luzerne
- Township: Newport

Area
  - Total: 3.78 sq mi (9.78 km^{2})
  - Land: 3.59 sq mi (9.31 km^{2})
  - Water: 0.18 sq mi (0.47 km^{2})

Population (2020)
  - Total: 1,877
  - Density: 522.3/sq mi (201.67/km^{2})
- Time zone: UTC-5 (Eastern (EST))
  - Summer (DST): UTC-4 (EDT)
- ZIP code: 18617
- Area code: 570
- FIPS code: 42-29680

Glen Lyon is a census-designated place (CDP) in Newport Township, Luzerne County, Pennsylvania, United States. The population was 1,877 at the 2020 census.

== History ==
The town of Glen Lyon was founded after anthracite coal mining began in Newport Township (ca. 1869). The colliery was operated by the Susquehanna Coal Company, a Pennsylvania Railroad property. The west side of the community was once called Morgantown; the east side was referred to as Williamstown. Later, the Glen Lyon Rail Station was established and the town was named after the terminus. Part of the east side, which was separated from the rest of the community by the railroad, became known as Canada. Roads and a streetcar line linked the town to Nanticoke and Wilkes-Barre. The streetcar line was replaced eventually by buses and automobiles as the main means of transport.

A hill divided the community into two parts. Sixth Shaft was established on the hill. Coal hoisted from that mine was moved across a bridge to the breaker (coal processing plant), which was built in 1887. Gravity moved the coal through a series of stages. The coal would then come out the north end of the breaker, where it was loaded onto railroad cars and trucks. The Seventh Shaft colliery operated west of Glen Lyon.

The town was originally developed by Welsh miners (who were Protestants); they were usually members of the Methodist church. There was a small Methodist church on Market Street. Later, immigrants from Central Europe (e.g., Poland) and Southern Europe became predominant. Two Polish Catholic parishes, Saint Adalbert's and Saint Michael's, were founded in the late nineteenth century. Their churches were built on the west side of the breaker. Other European miners and their families belonged to Ukrainian or "Byzantine Rite" parishes on the east side of town. A company-operated store existed for quite some time in Glen Lyon; it closed in the 1920s. Commercial structures were erected on Nanticoke Street, later Main Street, providing food and supplies to the community. Several neighborhood taverns existed throughout the town. Glen Lyon's miners were involved in unionization activities, culminating in their representation by the United Mine Workers.

Mining declined after the Second World War. The M. A. Hanna Company closed Seventh Shaft but retained Sixth Shaft and its breaker well into the 1960s. The breaker closed in 1971; it later burned overnight in October 1974. The death of deep mining in Northeastern Pennsylvania after the 1959 Knox Mine Disaster also diminished the town. However, some strip mining did continue in the following years. Small dress factories provided employment, mostly for women, in the period when mining was in decline; but they too closed. Retirees formed a large portion of the population. Many businesses closed as deep mining declined, and increasing numbers of houses stood vacant. The Roman Catholic churches were gradually consolidated, and St. Michael's was demolished (ca. 2004). St. Dennis, the "Irish" church, became a possession of the Knights of Columbus.

Glen Lyon was fictionalized as "Coaltown" for the 1948 film The Miracle of the Bells, and some exterior scenes were shot there.

== Geography ==
Glen Lyon is located at 41°10′32″N 76°4′28″W (41.175582, -76.074556).

According to the United States Census Bureau, the CDP has a total area of 3.4 square miles (8.8 km^{2}), of which 3.3 square miles (8.5 km^{2}) is land and 0.1 square miles (0.26 km^{2}), or 2.05%, is water.

== Demographics ==
Historical population
Census	Pop.	Note	%±
2000	1,881		—
2010	1,873		−0.4%
2020	1,877		0.2%
U.S. Decennial Census

As of the census of 2000, there were 1,881 people, 828 households, and 494 families residing in the CDP. The population density was 563.5 inhabitants per square mile (217.6/km^{2}). There were 1,089 housing units at an average density of 326.3 per square mile (126.0/km^{2}). The racial makeup of the CDP was 97.98% White, 1.49% African American, 0.21% Asian, and 0.32% from two or more races. Hispanic or Latino of any race were 0.37% of the population.

There were 828 households, out of which 26.8% had children under the age of 18 living with them, 38.9% were married couples living together, 15.2% had a female householder with no husband present, and 40.3% were non-families. 34.7% of all households were made up of individuals, and 20.4% had someone living alone who was 65 years of age or older. The average household size was 2.27 and the average family size was 2.89.

In the CDP, the population was spread out, with 23.0% under the age of 18, 9.1% from 18 to 24, 28.6% from 25 to 44, 20.5% from 45 to 64, and 18.8% who were 65 years of age or older. The median age was 37 years. For every 100 females, there were 92.5 males. For every 100 females age 18 and over, there were 84.8 males.

The median income for a household in the CDP was $24,271, and the median income for a family was $36,250. Males had a median income of $28,576 versus $20,323 for females. The per capita income for the CDP was $13,753. About 16.9% of families and 22.2% of the population were below the poverty line, including 35.0% of those under age 18 and 16.2% of those age 65 or over.

== Education ==
The school district is Greater Nanticoke Area School District.

== Notable people ==
- Bob Duliba, baseball player
- Tess Gardella, Broadway entertainer

== Gallery ==
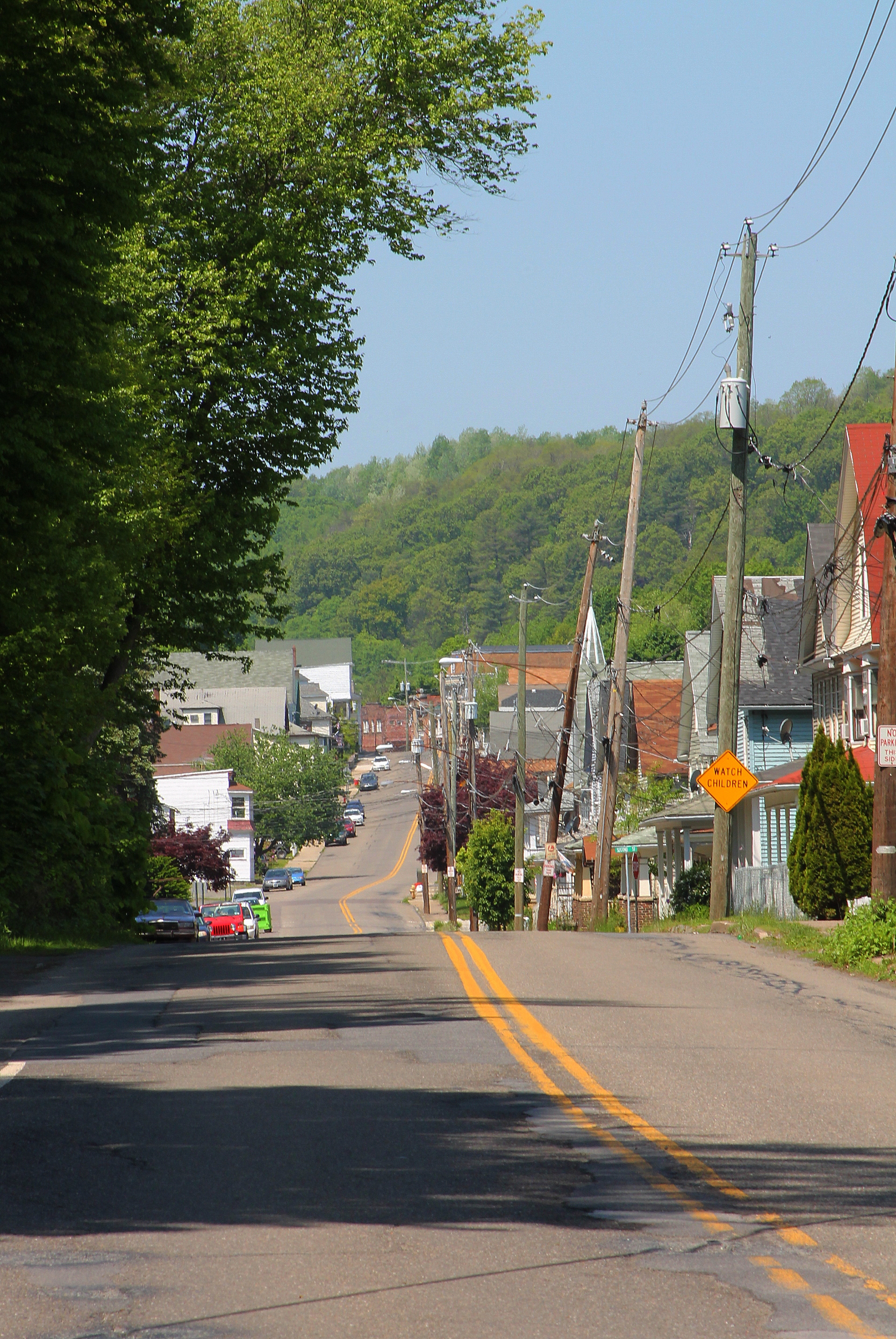
Glen Lyon from the east

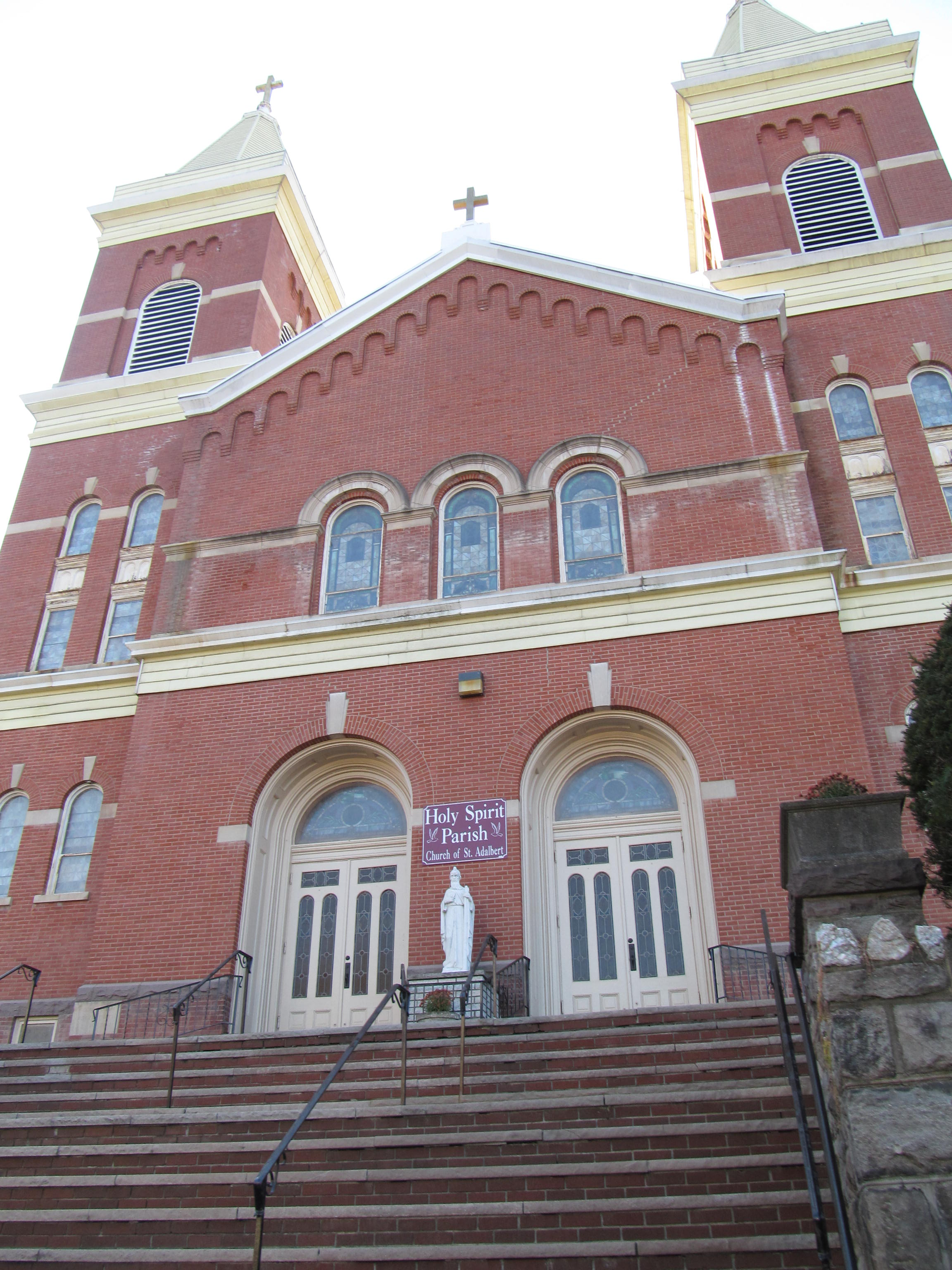
Church in Glen Lyon

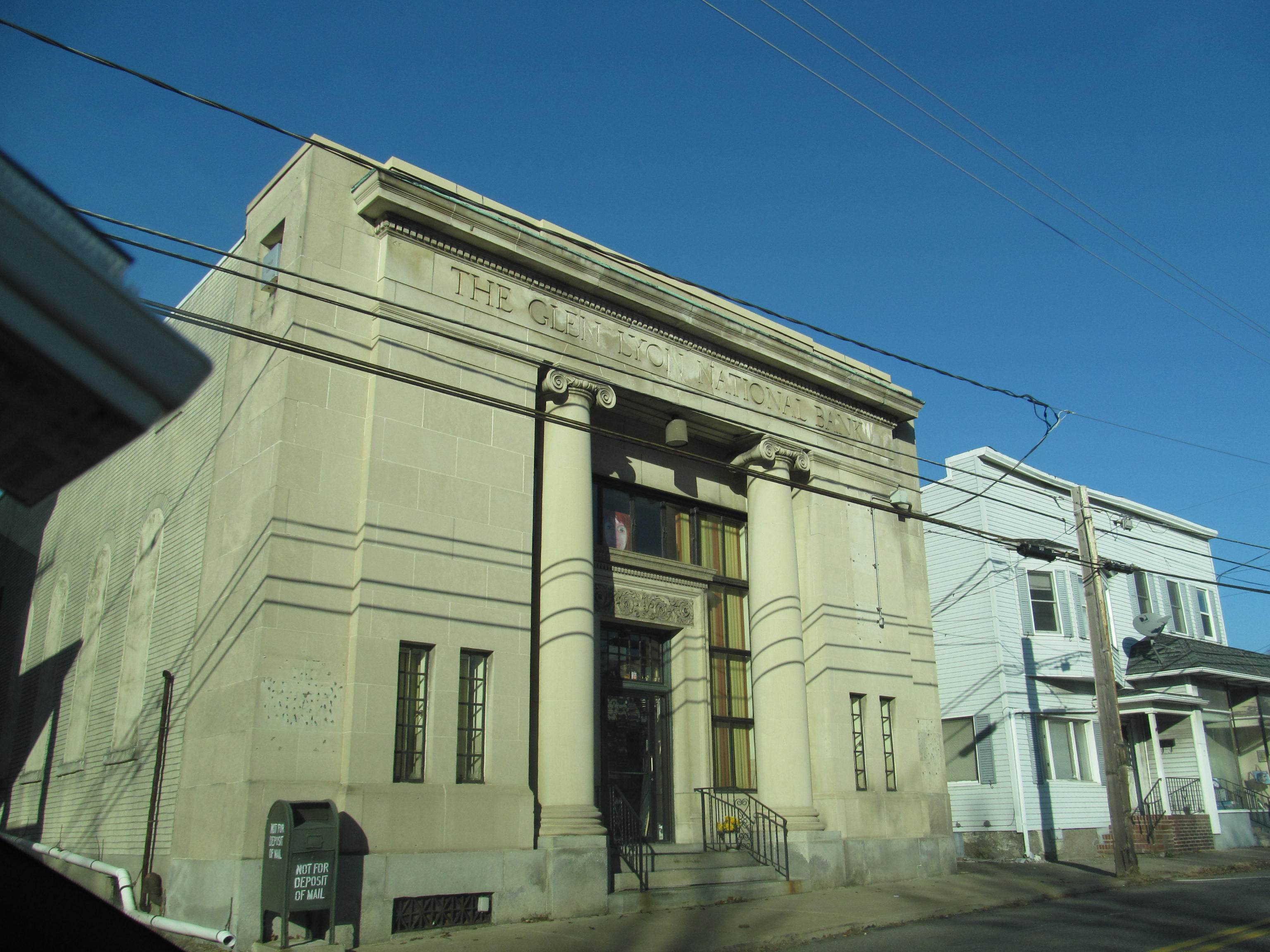
Bank in Glen Lyon

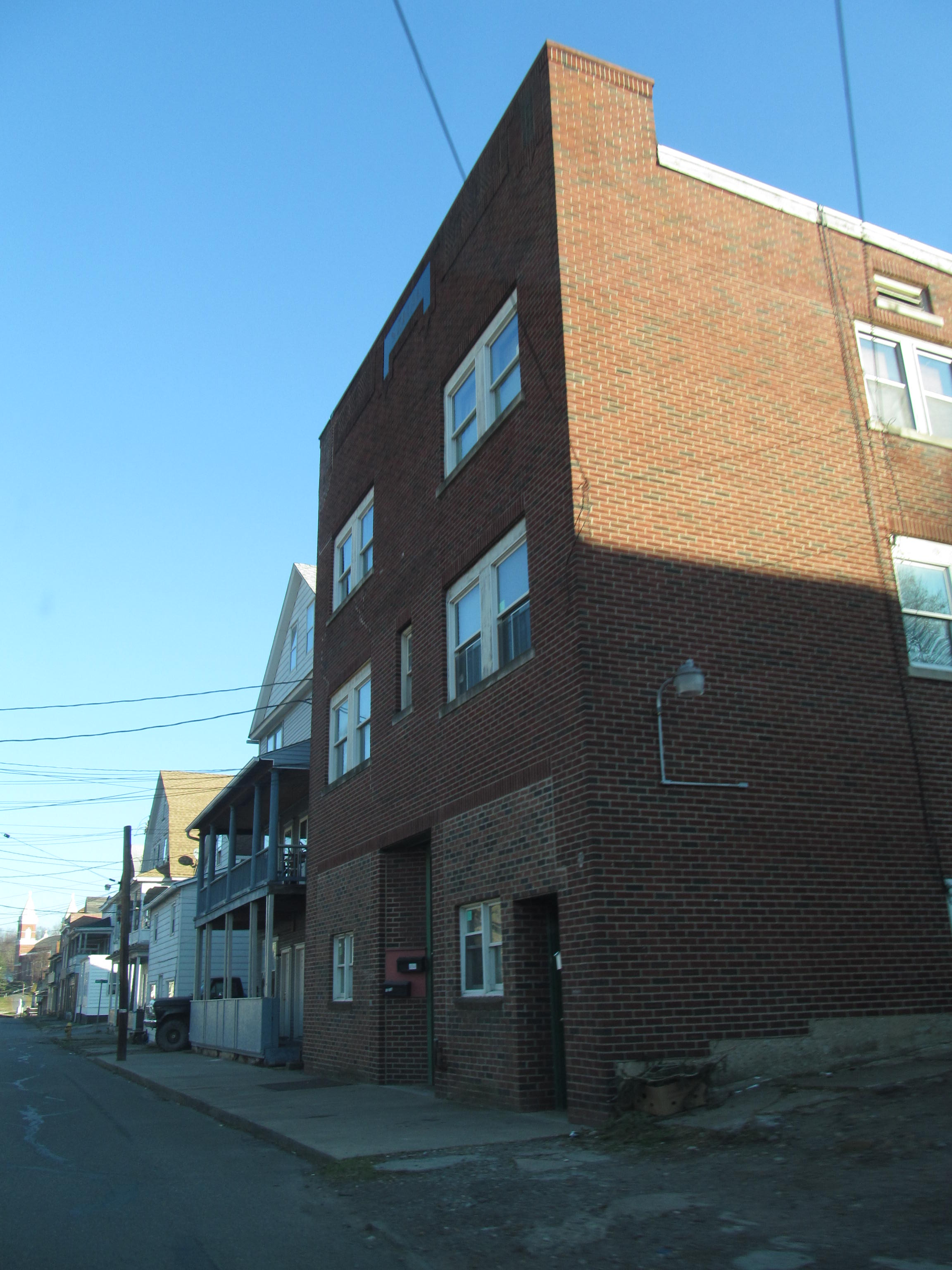
Glen Lyon

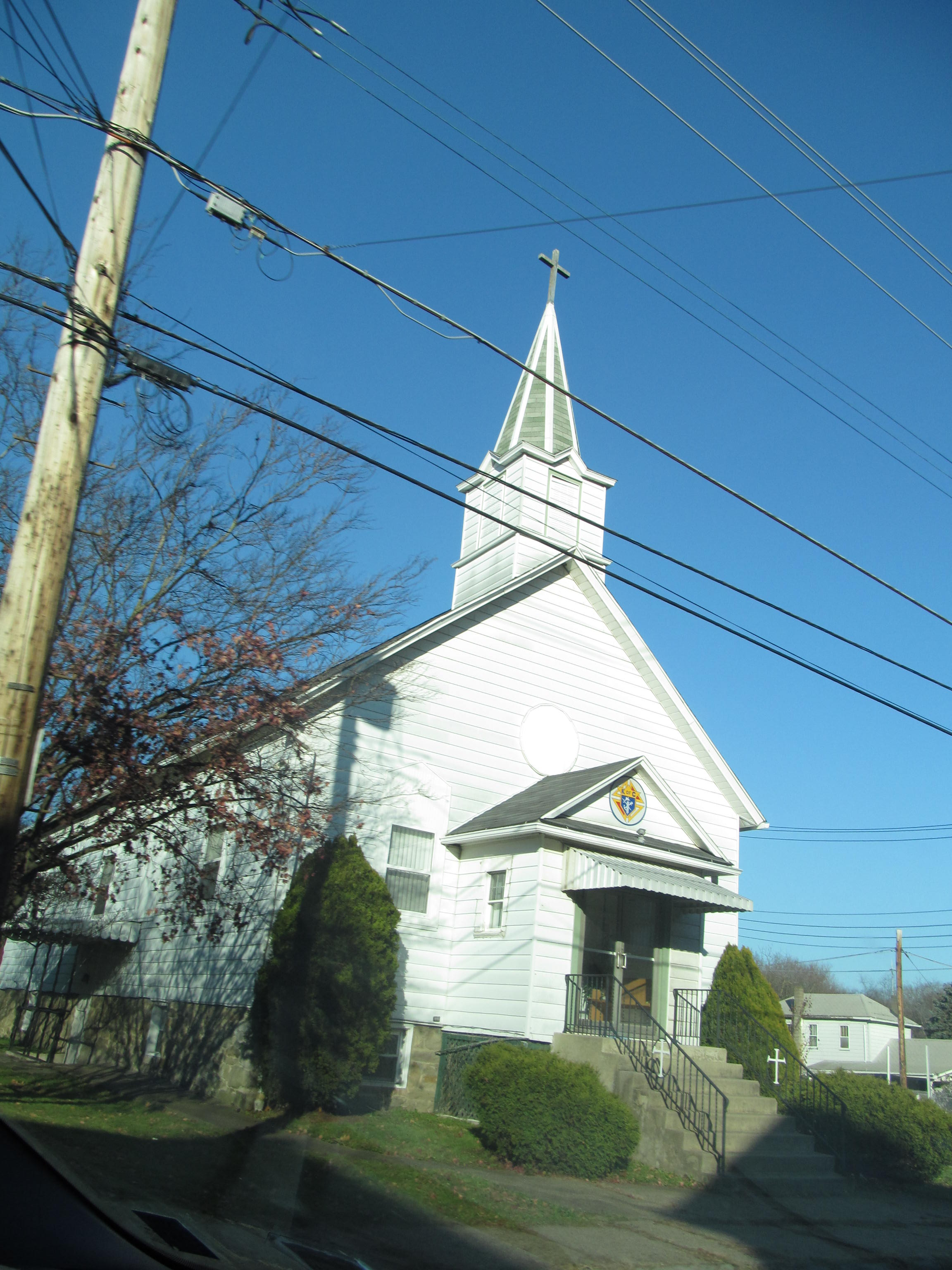
Church in Glen Lyon

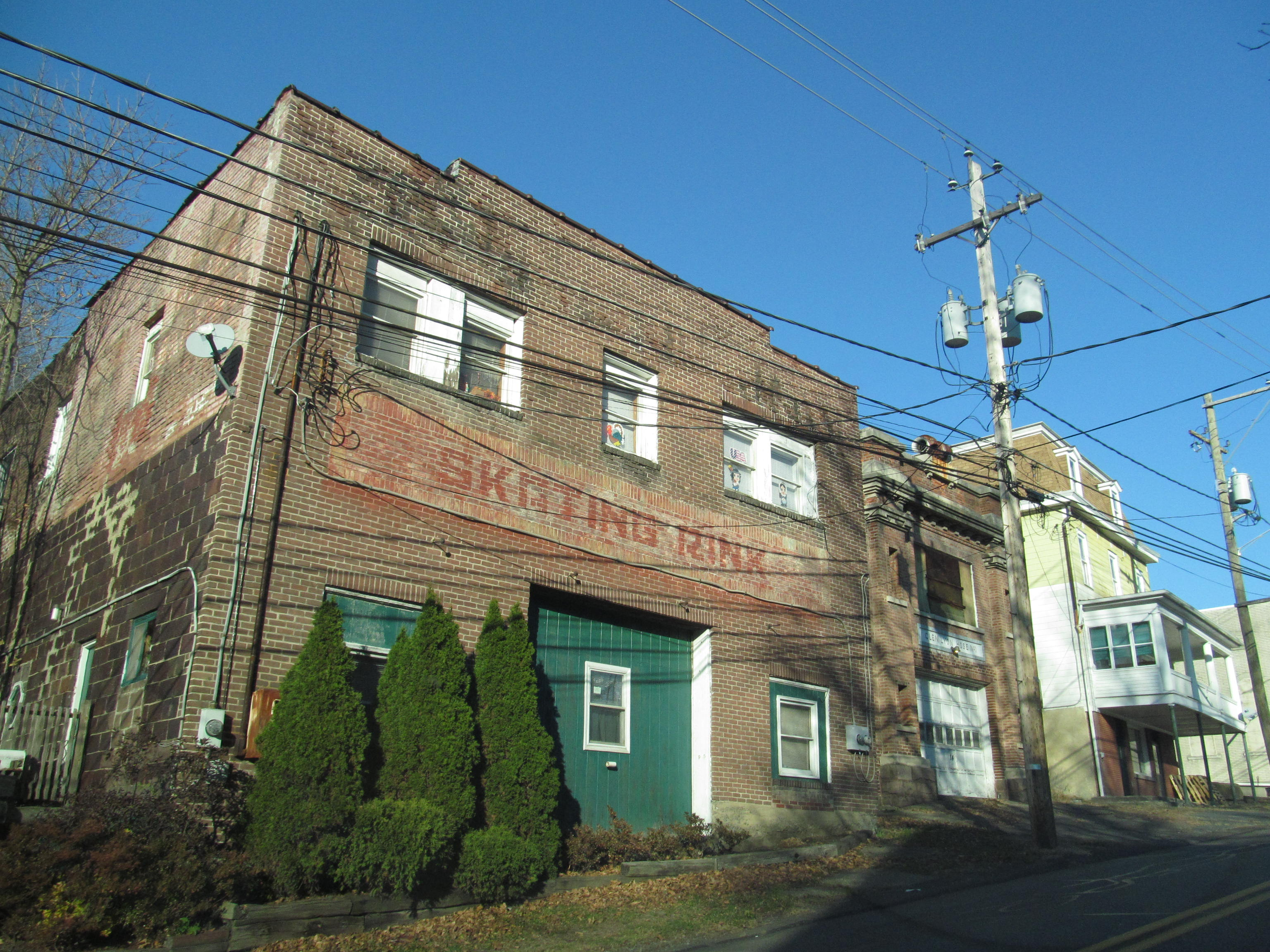
Glen Lyon

== Sources ==
- Ciesla, Charles C., History of Nanticoke City and Newport Township, Nanticoke: Nanticoke Historical Society, 2003. ISBN 0-9678514-7-5
- Bodnar, John E., Anthracite People: Families, Unions, and Work, 1900-1940 , Harrisburg: Commonwealth of Pennsylvania, Pennsylvania Historical and Museum Commission, 1983. ISBN 0-89271-023-3
