= Greater Nanticoke Area School District =

School district in Pennsylvania

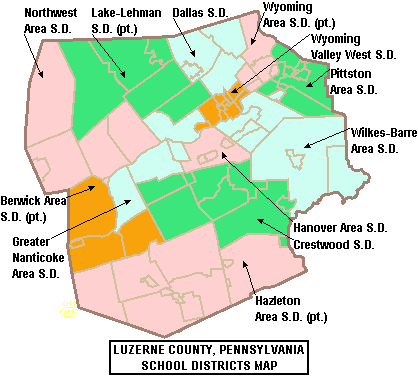
- Location of Greater Nanticoke Area School District in Luzerne County, Pennsylvania

Address
- 427 Kosciuszko Street Nanticoke, Luzerne County, Pennsylvania, 18634; United States

District information
- Type: Public

Other information
- Website: gnasd.com

The Greater Nanticoke Area School District is a midsized, public school district in Luzerne County. The district is one of the 500 public school districts of Pennsylvania. The District serves Nanticoke, Plymouth and the surrounding Newport and Conyngham townships. Greater Nanticoke Area School District encompasses approximately 52 square miles (130 km^{2}).

As of the 2000 census, the school district served a resident population of 19,443. By 2010, the district's population declined to 19,097 people. In 2009, the per capita income was $16,077 while the median family income was $37,672. In the Commonwealth, the median family income was $49,501 and the United States median family income was $49,445, in 2010.

The Greater Nanticoke Area School District operates three schools: a high school (grades 9-12), Educational Center (grades 6-8), Elementary Center (grades 3-5), and Kennedy early learning center (grades prek-2). GNASD previously operated Lincoln Elementary and K.M. Smith Elementary, but they ceased operation.

== Extracurriculars ==
The district offers a minimal amount of clubs and sports. In 2010, the Greater Nanticoke Area varsity softball team won the state championship. A notable news source for the Greater Nanticoke Area High School is the student newspaper called "The GNA Insider".
