= Newport Township, Pennsylvania =

Township in the United States

Coordinates: 41°10′30″N 75°59′58″W

- Township
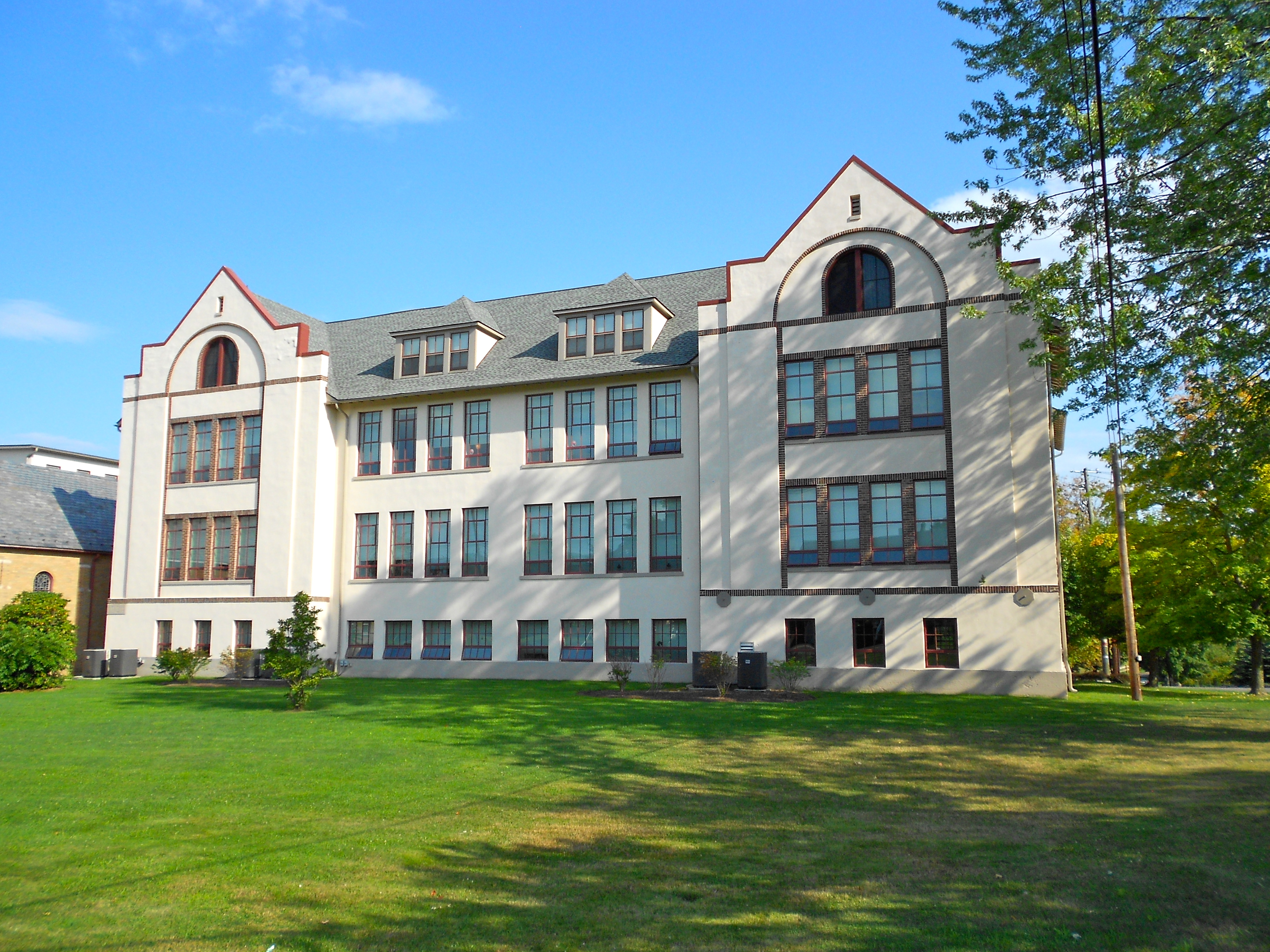
- St. Stanislaus Institute

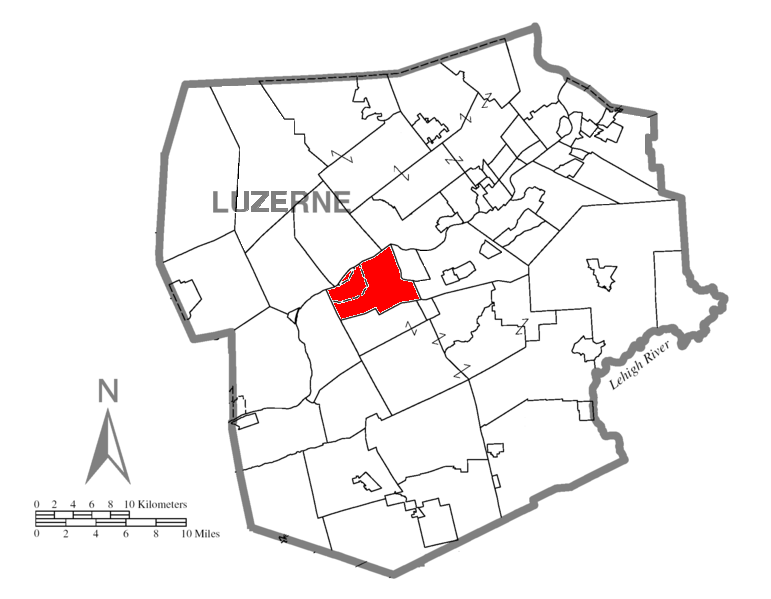
- Map of Luzerne County highlighting Newport Township

- Map of Pennsylvania highlighting Luzerne County
- Country: United States
- State: Pennsylvania
- County: Luzerne
- Settled: 1772
- Incorporated: 1790

Area
  - Total: 17.19 sq mi (44.51 km^{2})
  - Land: 16.76 sq mi (43.40 km^{2})
  - Water: 0.43 sq mi (1.11 km^{2})

Population (2020)
  - Total: 4,444 ▼
  - Estimate (2021): 4,453
  - Density: 314.7/sq mi (121.51/km^{2})
- Time zone: UTC-5 (Eastern (EST))
  - Summer (DST): UTC-4 (EDT)
- FIPS code: 42-079-53960
- Website: www.newporttownship.org

Newport Township is a township in Luzerne County, Pennsylvania, United States. As of 2020, the population was 4,444. Newport is located on the outskirts of Nanticoke City.

== History ==
=== Establishment ===
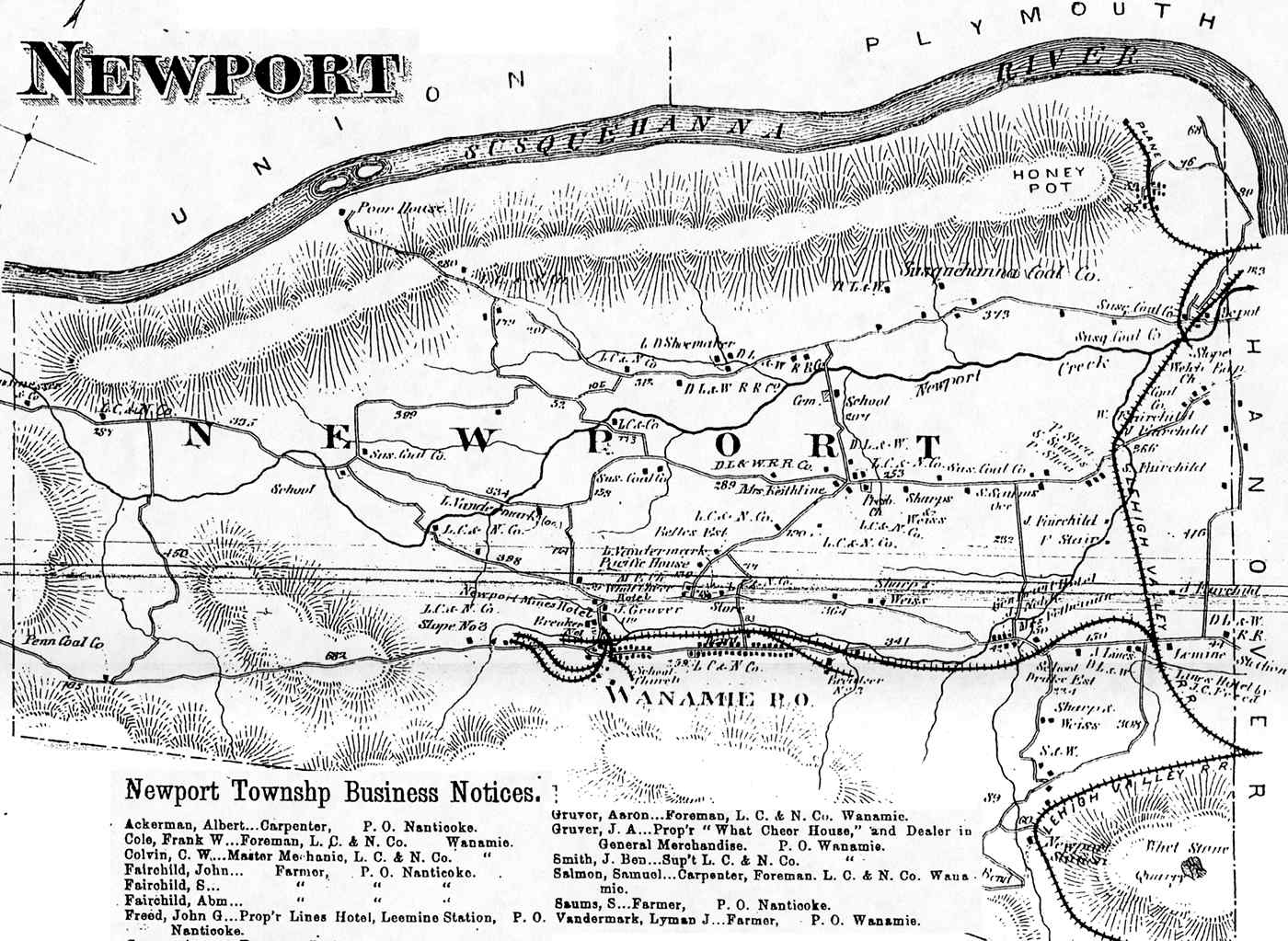
An old map of Newport Township

Newport was incorporated as a township in 1790. It is one of the original townships in Luzerne County. The municipality derives its name from Newport, Rhode Island. The first settlement in modern-day Newport Township was established by Major Prince Alden in 1772. A few years later, his sons (Mason and John) erected a forge on Nanticoke Creek. One of the first stores in the territory was established by Jacob Ramback; it was constructed on a road between Wanamie and Nanticoke.

Due to the growing coal mining industry in the Wyoming Valley (in the 19th century), farmers were selling large tracts of land to the coal companies. Even sawmills and gristmills were replaced by coal mines. Alden, Glen Lyon, and Wanamie were just a few of the mining villages in the township. Mine shafts and collieries were constructed throughout the territory.

=== Boom and bust ===
At the beginning of the 20th century, Luzerne County was in the midst of an economic boom. Industry, which included manufacturing and coal mining, drew thousands of immigrants (mostly from Europe) to the region. By the mid-20th century, anthracite production was declining at a fairly steady rate. Consumers were gradually switching from coal to other forms of energy (e.g., oil, gas, and electricity).

The Knox Mine Disaster was the final blow to the industry. On January 22, 1959, the Susquehanna River broke through the River Slope Mine in Port Griffith, Jenkins Township. The incident claimed twelve lives. In the following months, two of the area's largest coal companies announced a full withdrawal from the anthracite business. Thousands of jobs were lost and the mining industry never recovered in Luzerne County.

=== Contemporary history ===
St. Stanislaus Institute, also known as St. Stanislaus Orphanage and Holy Child Church, was built between 1918 and 1939. The facility served as a Catholic orphanage until it closed in 1972. St. Stanislaus was added to the National Register of Historic Places in 2008. The building is now occupied by apartments. Holy Child closed in 2010. A nursing home was built nearby.

In 1986, State Correctional Institute at Retreat opened in northwestern Newport Township, replacing the mental hospital. SCI Retreat closed in June 2020. It was a medium security correctional facility for men.

== Geography ==
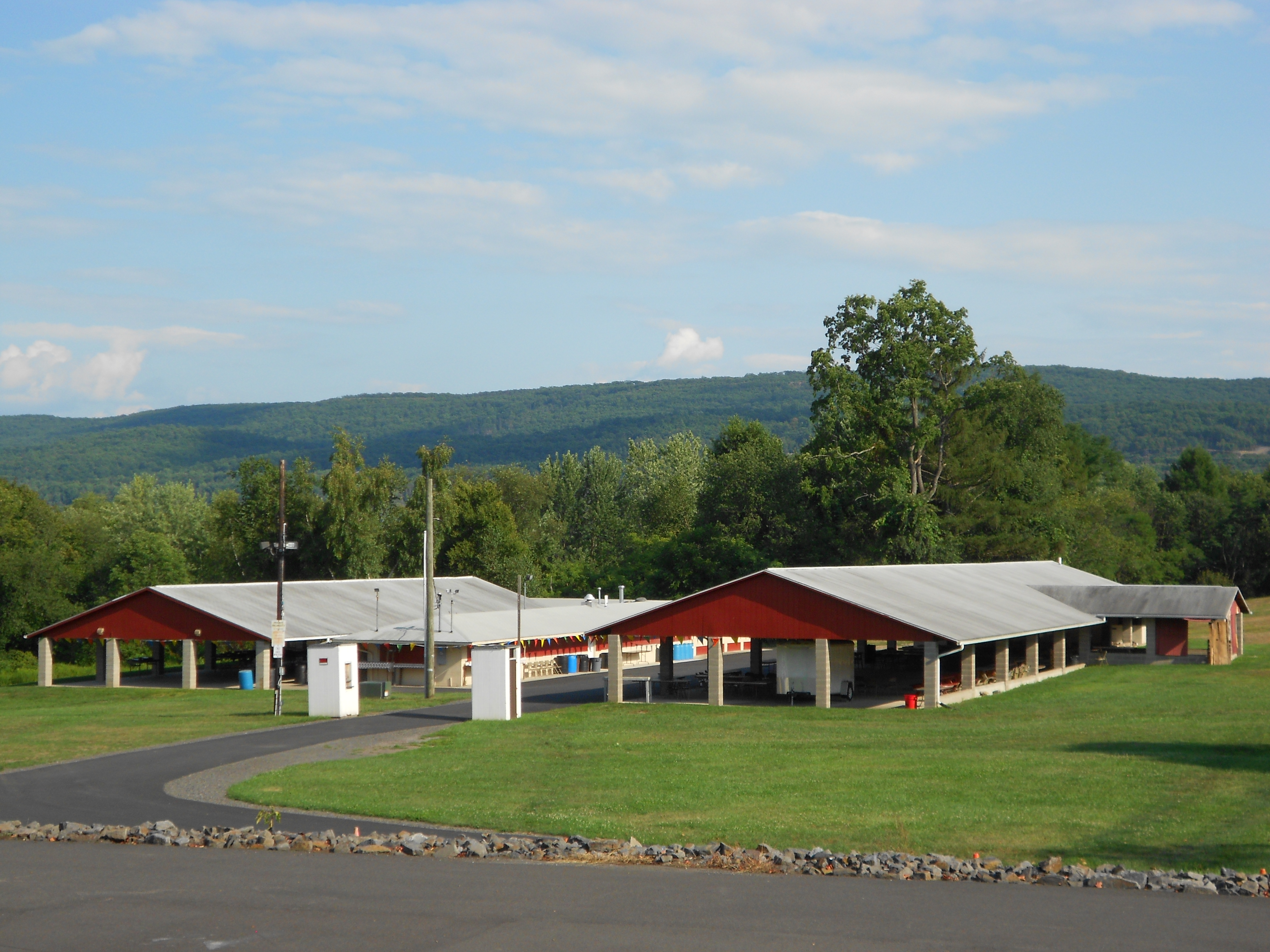
The picnic area at St. Stanislaus Institute

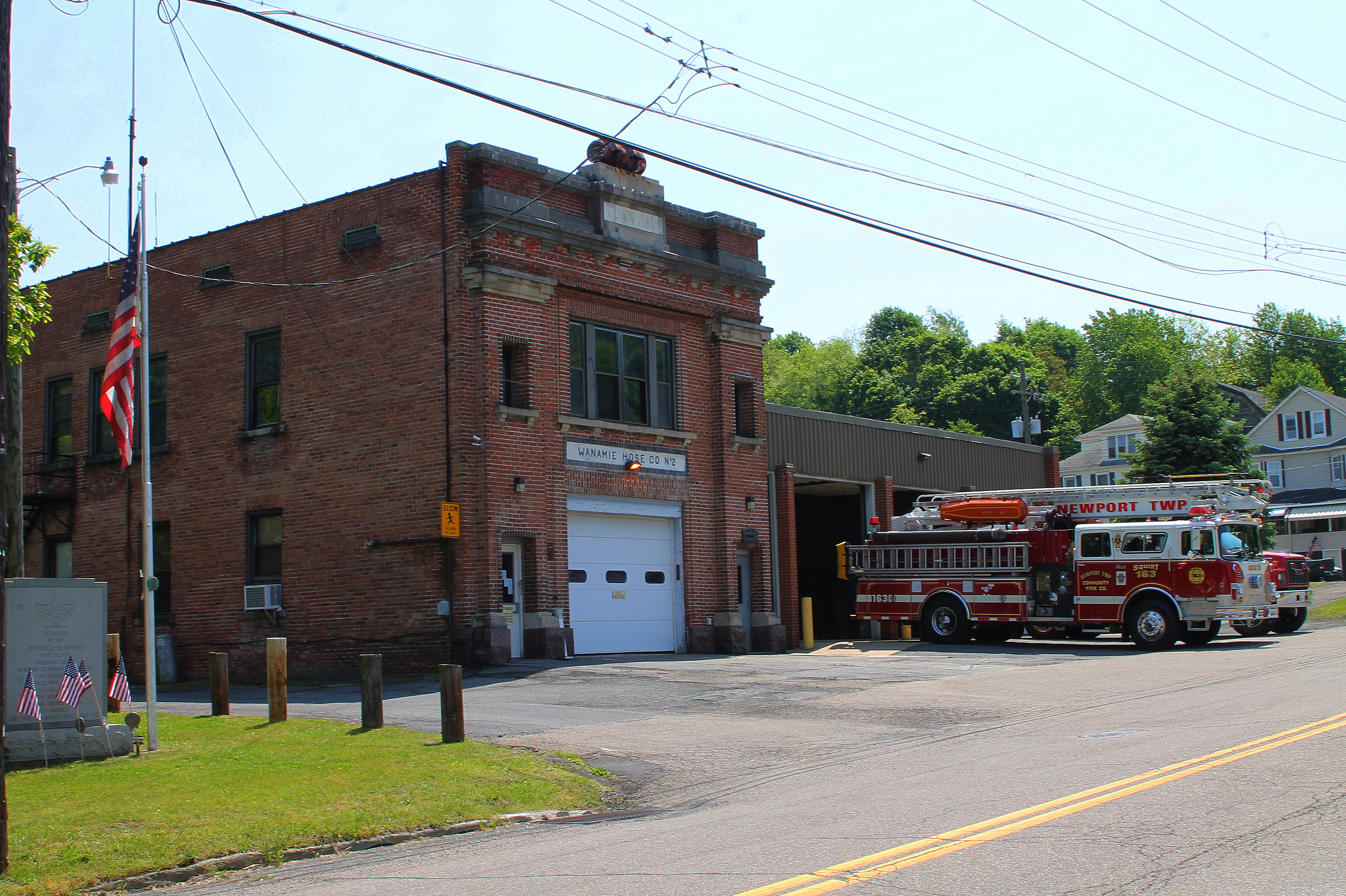
Fire station in Wanamie

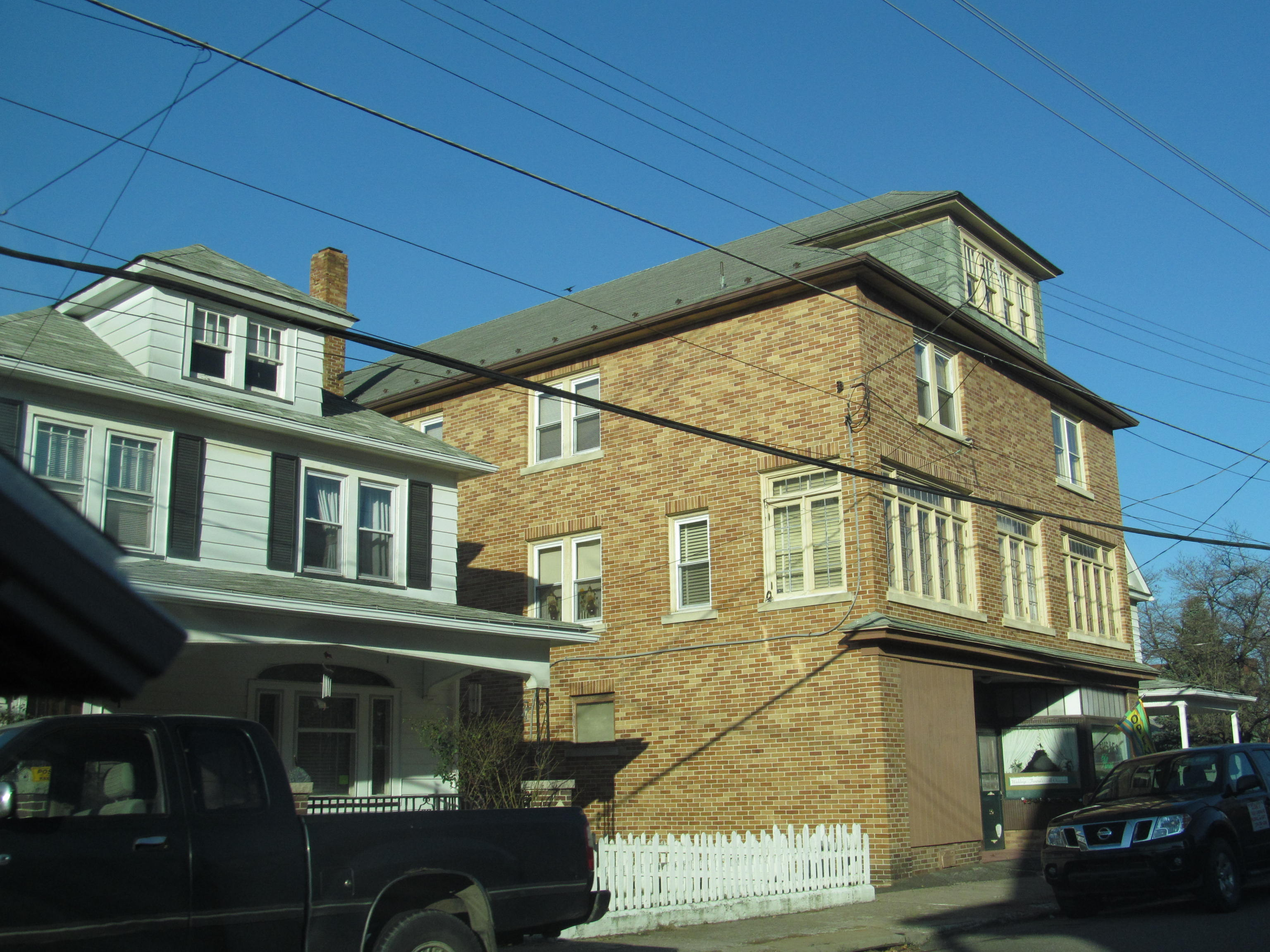
Houses in Glen Lyon

According to the United States Census Bureau, the township has a total area of 17.2 square miles (44.5 km^{2}), of which 16.8 square miles (43.4 km^{2}) is land and 0.42 square miles (1.1 km^{2}), or 2.49%, is water. Most of the township is forested. It is drained by the Susquehanna River (which forms its northern boundary).

The northern and southern portions are mountainous. The elevation of Penobscot Mountain reaches 1,500 to 1,629 feet (457 to 497 m) above sea level along the township's southern border with Slocum Township. Most of the people live in the basin of Newport Creek, which flows northeast from Glen Lyon to the Susquehanna River (in Nanticoke). Newport Township consists of the communities of Alden Station, Glen Lyon, Lee, Newport Center, Sheatown, and Wanamie. The State Correctional Institute at Retreat is in a remote area of the municipality (along the Susquehanna River). The facility can only be accessed by a bridge over the river from U.S. Route 11 or by helicopter.

=== Neighboring municipalities ===
- Nanticoke (northeast)
- Hanover Township (east)
- Nuangola (southeast)
- Slocum Township (south)
- Conyngham Township (west)
- Union Township (northwest)
- Hunlock Township (north)
- Plymouth Township (north)

== Government officials ==
- Township manager: Joseph Hillan
- Commissioners:
  - John Zyla — President of Board of Commissioners/Police Dept.
  - Michael Roke — Fire Dept.
  - John Vishnefski — Parks and Recreation Dept.
  - Deborah Forgach Zaleski — Code Enforcement Dept.
- Police chief: Jeremy Blank
- Fire chief: James Hoffman

== Public safety ==
- Police: The Newport Township Police Department provides full time police coverage to township residents.
- Fire: Fire suppression is provided by the Newport Township Fire Department (Luzerne County Station 163). The department is a combination department with a paid apparatus operator (who is supplemented by volunteer staff). The department also provides mutual aid responses to surrounding communities.
- EMS: Ambulance service is provided by the Nanticoke Community Ambulance Association (Medic 25/Ambulance 558), which is located in Nanticoke City. Nanticoke EMS provides residents with both ALS (Advanced Life Support) and BLS (Basic Life Support) levels of pre-hospital care.

== Demographics ==
Historical population
Census	Pop.	Note	%±
2000	5,006		—
2010	5,374		7.4%
2020	4,444		−17.3%
2021 (est.)	4,453		0.2%
U.S. Decennial Census

As of the census of 2000, there were 5,006 people, 1,789 households, and 1,118 families residing in the township. The population density was 306.1 inhabitants per square mile (118.2/km^{2}). There were 2,166 housing units at an average density of 132.4 per square mile (51.1/km^{2}). The racial makeup of the township was 90.17% White, 8.57% African American, 0.12% Native American, 0.30% Asian, 0.54% from other races, and 0.30% from two or more races. Hispanic or Latino of any race were 2.30% of the population.

There were 1,789 households, out of which 24.4% had children under the age of 18 living with them, 45.5% were married couples living together, 12.2% had a female householder with no husband present, and 37.5% were non-families. 32.5% of all households were made up of individuals, and 19.5% had someone living alone who was 65 years of age or older. The average household size was 2.27 and the average family size was 2.87.

In the township the population was spread out, with 16.1% under the age of 18, 10.2% from 18 to 24, 33.4% from 25 to 44, 21.5% from 45 to 64, and 18.7% who were 65 years of age or older. The median age was 38 years. For every 100 females, there were 127.8 males. For every 100 females age 18 and over, there were 129.6 males.

The median income for a household in the township was $32,073, and the median income for a family was $40,987. Males had a median income of $28,466 versus $22,035 for females. The per capita income for the township was $16,930. About 9.3% of families and 14.0% of the population were below the poverty line, including 24.4% of those under age 18 and 14.8% of those age 65 or over.

== Notable people ==
- Bob Duliba, baseball player
- John S. Fine, governor of Pennsylvania

== Gallery ==
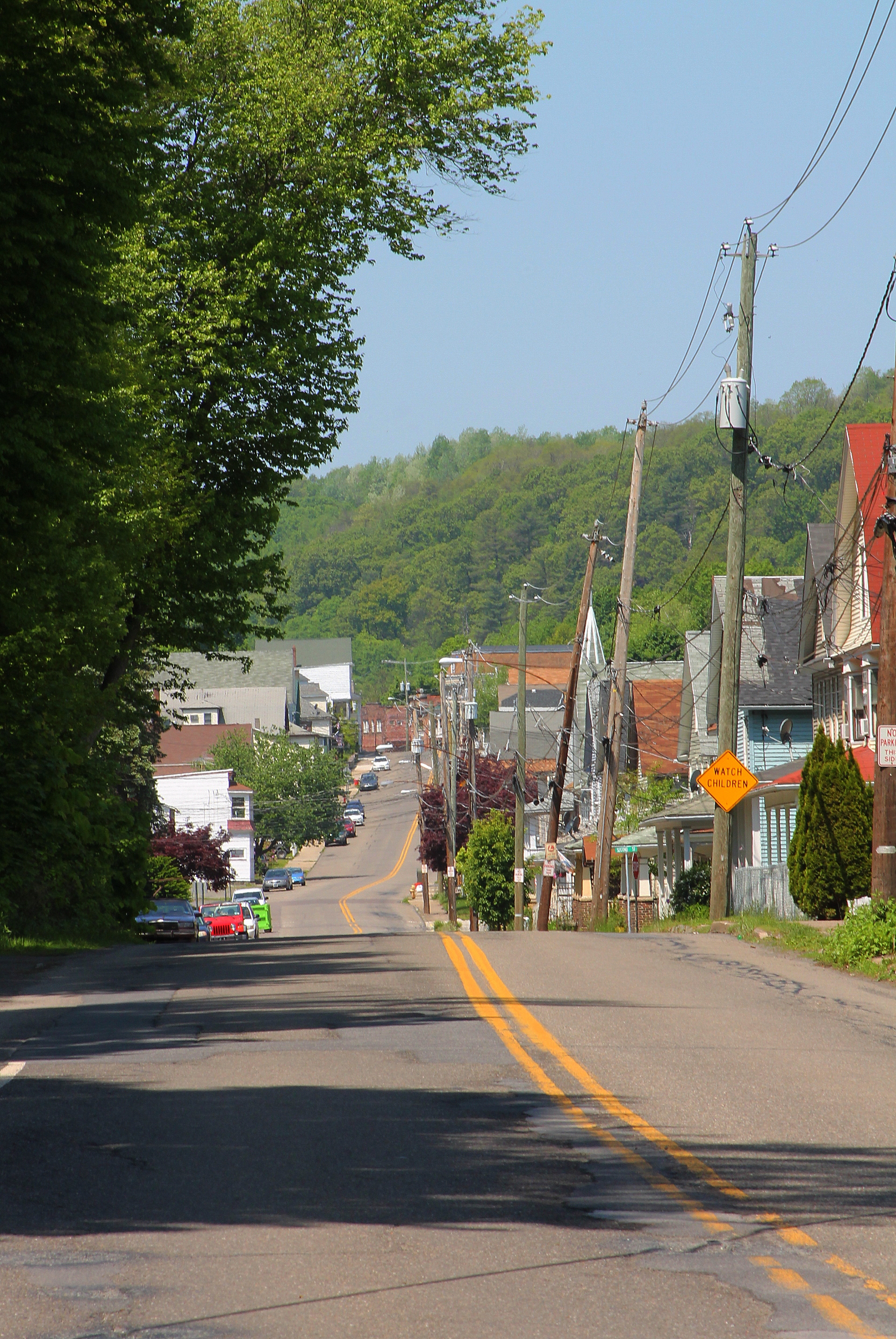
Glen Lyon

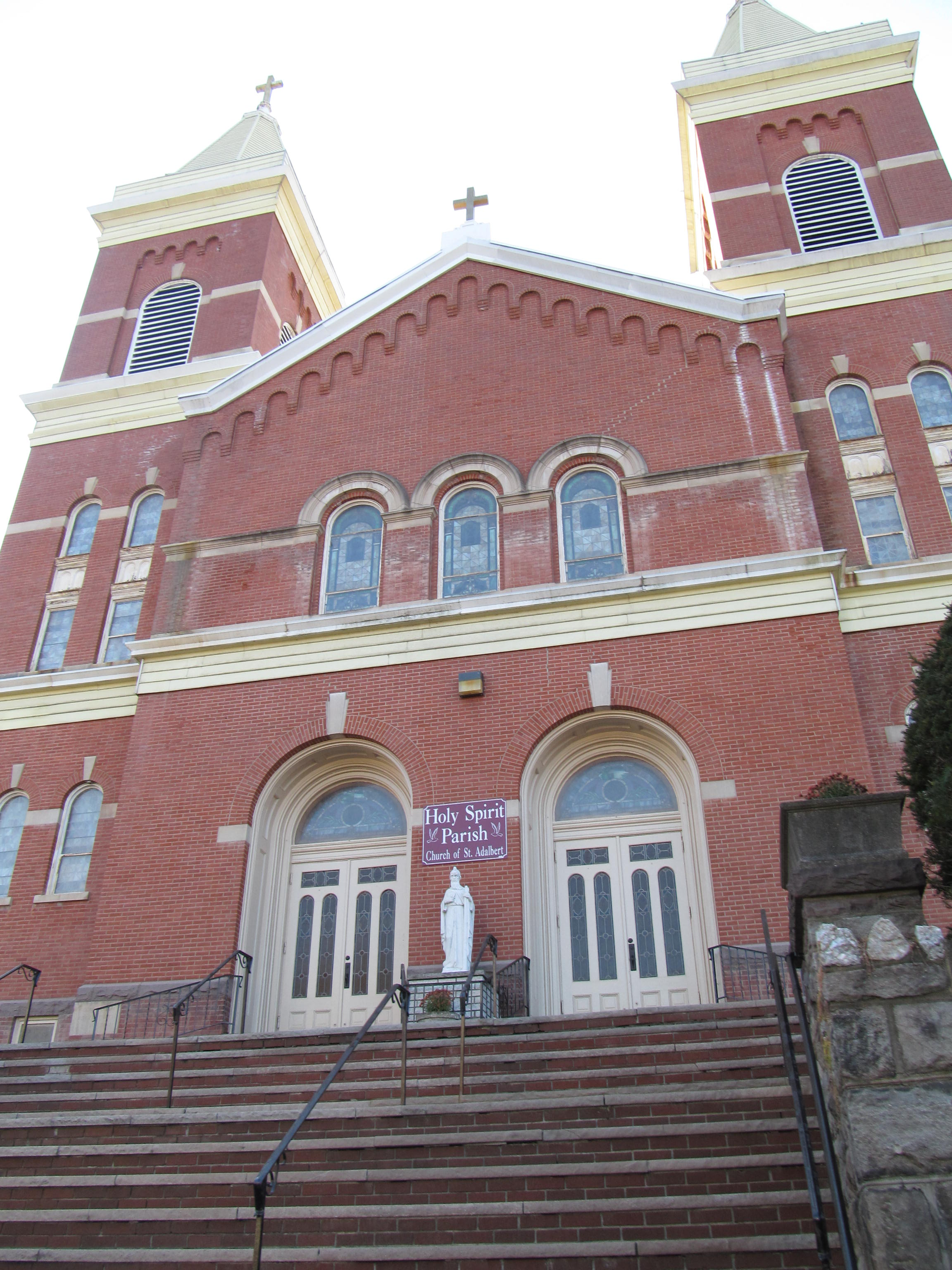
Glen Lyon

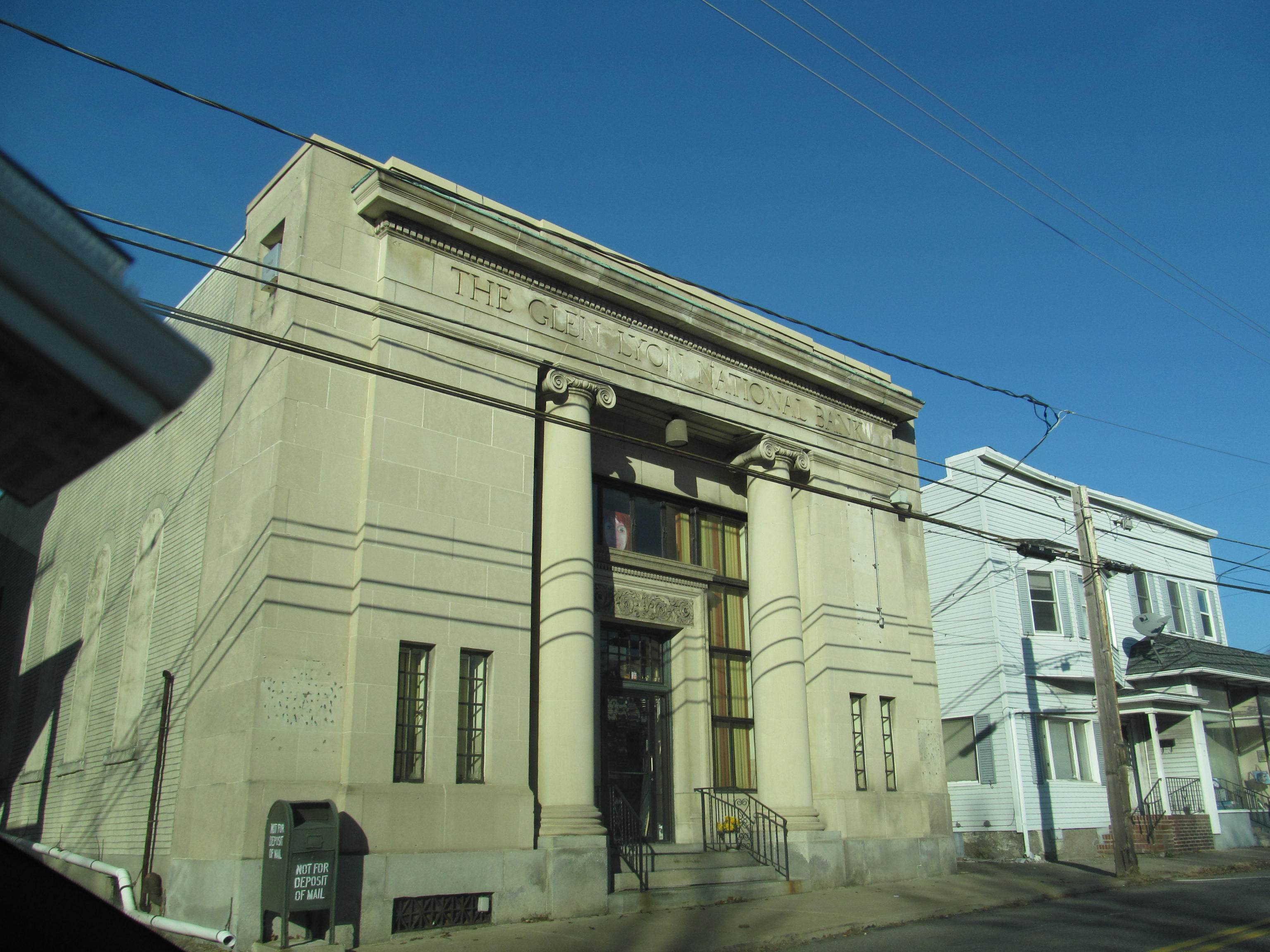
Glen Lyon

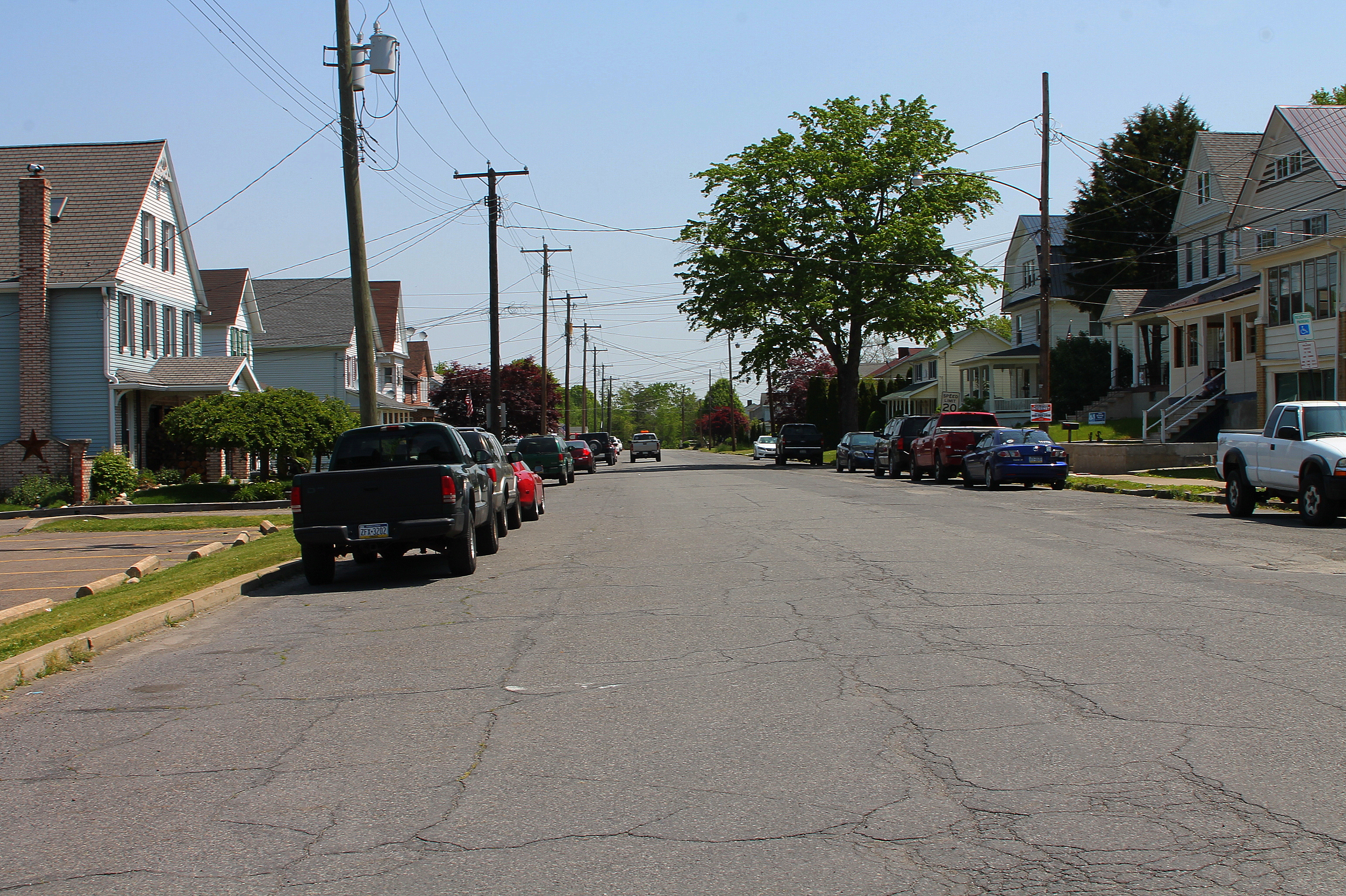
Wanamie

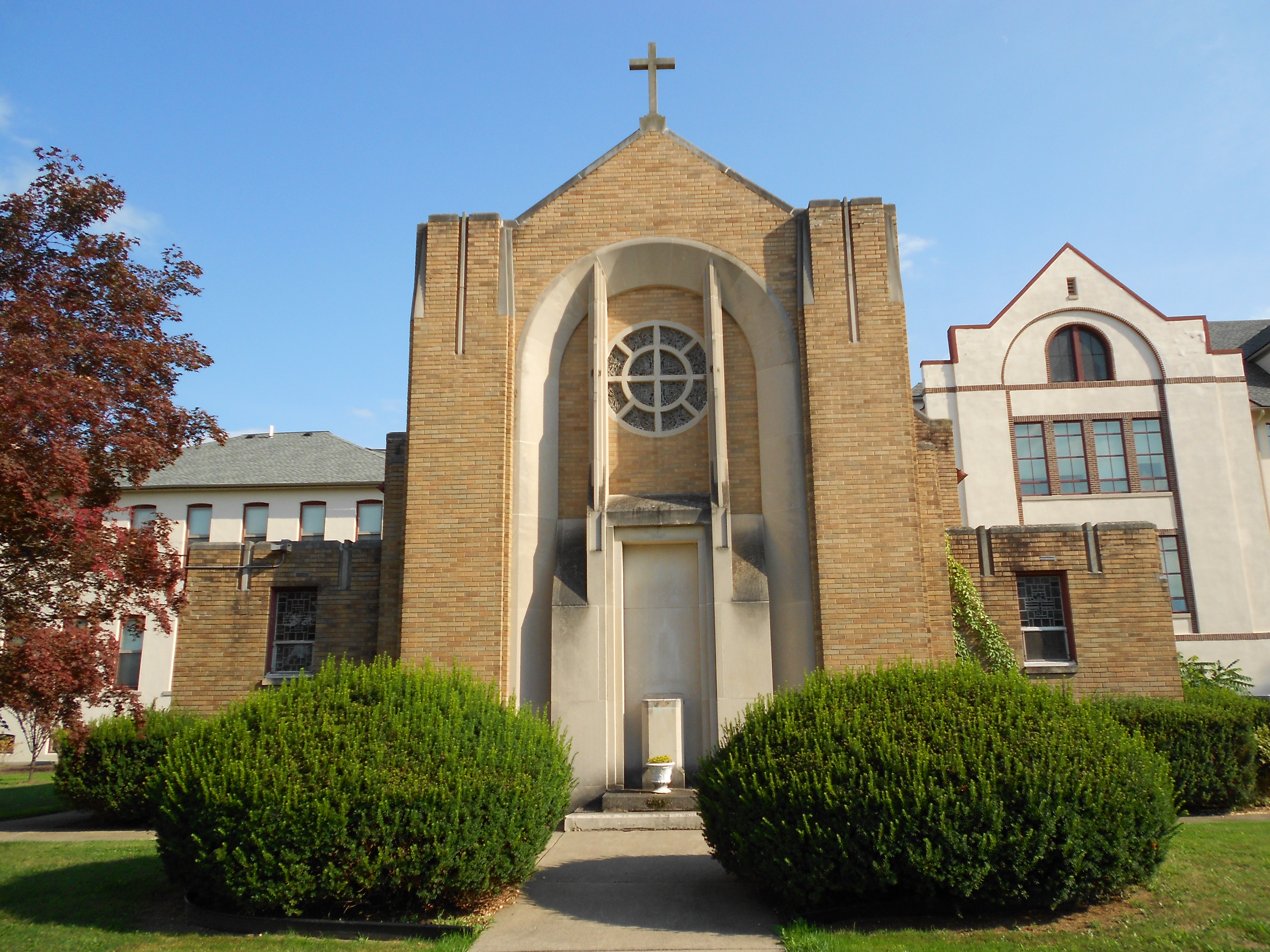
St. Stanislaus Institute’s chapel

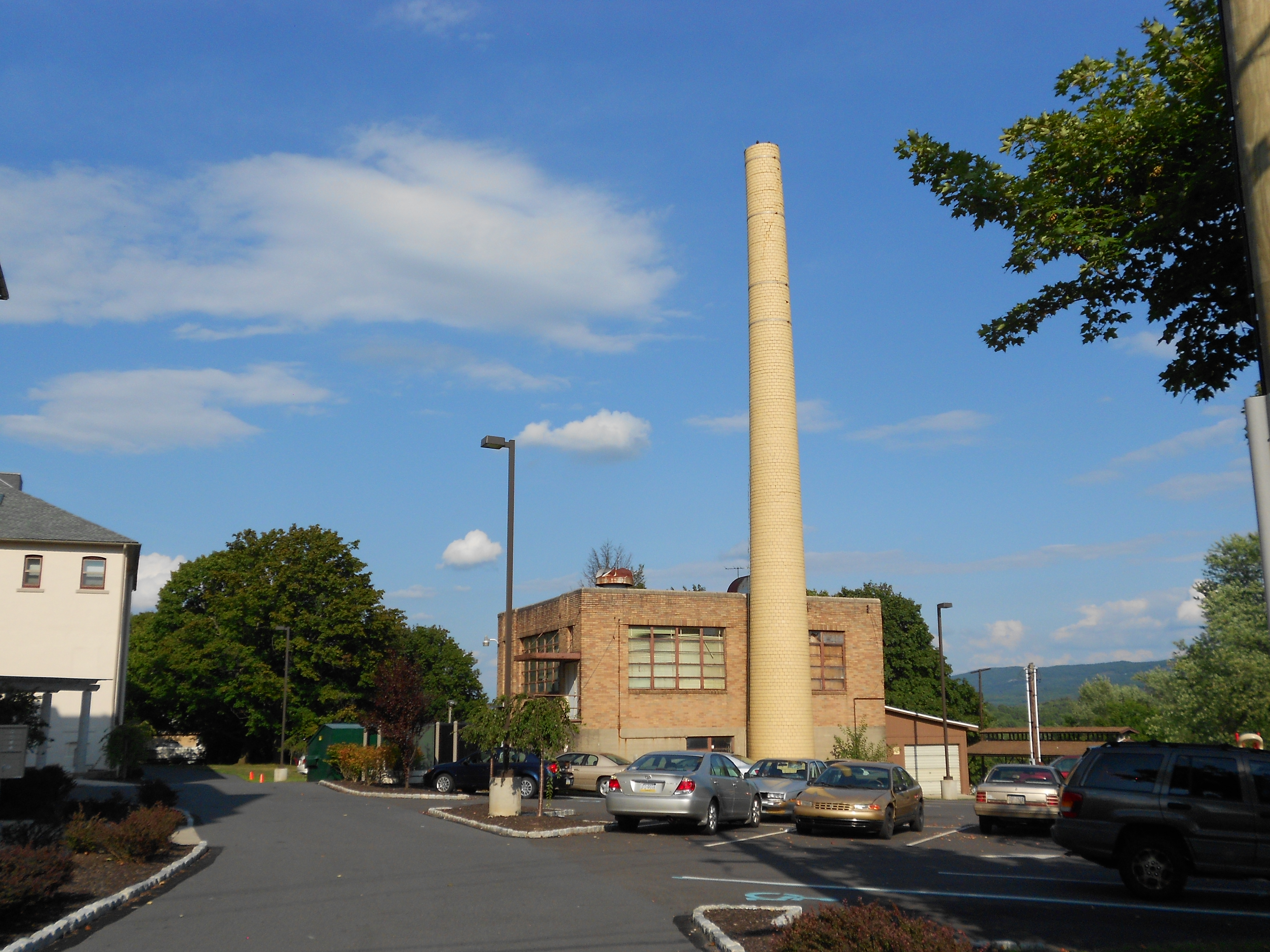
St. Stanislaus Institute's boiler building
