= Oneida Number Three Tunnel =

Tunnel in Schuylkill County, Pennsylvania, U.S.

Coordinates: 40.9183°N 76.1472°W

- Interactive map of Oneida Number Three Tunnel

Overview
- Start: mines in East Union Township, Pennsylvania
- End: Tomhicken Creek in North Union Township, Schuylkill County, Pennsylvania

Operation
- Opened: 1930s

Technical
- Length: 7,000 feet (2,100 m)

The Oneida Number Three Tunnel (also known as the Oneida #3 Tunnel) is a mine tunnel in Schuylkill County, Pennsylvania, in the United States. It is one of five major mine tunnels in the watershed of Catawissa Creek. The tunnel discharges into Tomhicken Creek downstream of the mouth of Little Tomhicken Creek. The tunnel was constructed in the 1930s and a passive treatment system was installed at the site of the tunnel in 2009. The tunnel is more than a mile long.

== Hydrology ==
The average discharge of the Oneida Number Three Tunnel is 3,820,000 gallons per day (approximately 2,653 gallons per minute). The tunnel is the largest discharge of acid mine drainage to Tomhicken Creek.

The pH of the water being discharged from the Oneida Number Three Tunnel ranges from 3.9 to 4.7. The average pH of the waters is 4.53. The concentration of acidity in the tunnel's waters is 17.35 milligrams per liter and the daily load of acidity is 552.8 pounds (250.7 kg). The acidity load requires an 89 percent reduction to meet its total maximum daily load requirements. The alkalinity concentration of its waters is 7.40 milligrams per liter and the load of alkalinity is 235.8 pounds (107.0 kg) per day. The net concentration of acidity is 15.8 milligrams per liter.

The concentration of iron in the discharge of the Oneida Number Three Tunnel is 0.18 milligrams per liter and the daily load is 5.7 pounds (2.6 kg). The iron load does not require any reduction to meet its total maximum daily load requirements. The manganese concentration is 0.59 milligrams per liter and the load of manganese is 18.8 pounds (8.5 kg) per day. The manganese load requires a 79 percent reduction to meet its total maximum daily load requirements. The aluminum concentration is 1.59 milligrams per liter and the daily load of it is 50.7 pounds (23.0 kg). The aluminum load requires a 71 percent reduction to meet its total maximum daily load requirements.

== Description and geography ==
The Oneida Number Three Tunnel discharges into Tomhicken Creek downstream of Little Tomhicken Creek. The tunnel is approximately 7,000 feet (2,100 m) long. The upper end of the tunnel is in mines in the South Green Mountain Coal Basin, which it drains part of. The tunnel runs roughly northwards until it reaches Tomhicken Creek. The tunnel is in East Union Township and North Union Township.

The Oneida Number Three Tunnel is in the Eastern Middle Anthracite Field. The tunnel is between Tomhicken Creek and a steep hill.

The total maximum daily load document for Catawissa Creek suggests reclaiming mined land in the Green Mountain Coal Basin to reduce the discharge of the Oneida Number Three Tunnel.

The Oneida Number Three Tunnel has a passive treatment system. The system was constructed in a similar manner to the way in which the Audenried Tunnel was constructed. However, it only has one limestone tank, as opposed to the Audenried Tunnel's three. There are plans to construct a second limestone tank for the passive treatment system.

== History ==
The Oneida Number Three tunnel was constructed during the 1930s. It was one of five mine drainage tunnels in the Catawissa Creek watershed to be constructed during this time (the others being the Audenried Tunnel, the Catawissa Tunnel, the Green Mountain Tunnel, and the Oneida Number One Tunnel).

The Catawissa Creek Restoration Association started working on constructing a passive treatment system for the Oneida Number Three Tunnel as early as 2003. The organization's work was funded by the United States Environmental Protection Agency. The construction of the passive treatment system was completed in December 2009. The system was the third such system in the Catawissa Creek to be constructed.

The Oneida Number Three Tunnel was damaged to the point of being useless during heavy rain in March 2011. It was repaired later in 2011. The tunnel's water quality was studied in the same year. It was also studied shortly after the passive treatment system was constructed.

As of 2003, the Oneida Number Three Tunnel is not listed on the Pennsylvania Section 303(d) of streams that are impaired due to pH.

== See also ==
- Audenried Tunnel coal mining drainage in Luzerne County
- Catawissa Tunnel coal mining drainage in Schuylkill County
- Green Mountain Tunnel coal mining drainage in Schuylkill County
- Jeddo Tunnel coal mining drainage in Luzerne County
- Oneida Number One Tunnel coal mining drainage in Schuylkill County
- Quakake Tunnel coal mining drainage in Carbon County
