= Catawissa Tunnel =

Mine drainage tunnel in Pennsylvania, US

Coordinates: 40.9108°N 76.0664°W

Overview
- Start: South Green Mountain Coal Basin in East Union Township, Pennsylvania
- End: Catawissa Creek in East Union Township, Pennsylvania

Operation
- Opened: 1930s

Technical
- Length: approximately 840 feet (260 m)

The Catawissa Tunnel is a mine drainage tunnel in Schuylkill County, Pennsylvania, in the United States. The tunnel discharges into Catawissa Creek further upstream than any other mine drainage tunnel in the watershed. The tunnel was constructed in the 1930s and a passive treatment system may or may not be installed at the site of the tunnel. The tunnel is several hundred feet long.

== Dissolved chemicals ==
The concentration of iron in the water discharged from the Catawissa Tunnel is 1.01 milligrams per liter and the daily load of iron is 6.9 pounds (3.1 kg). The iron load requires a 43 percent reduction to meet its total maximum daily load requirements. The concentration of manganese is 0.31 milligrams per liter and the load of manganese is 2.1 pounds (0.95 kg) per day. The load of manganese requires no reduction to meet its total maximum daily load requirements. The concentration of aluminum in the tunnel's waters is 1.27 milligrams per liter and the daily load is 8.7 pounds (3.9 kg). The aluminum load requires a 69 percent reduction to meet its total maximum daily load requirements. The concentrations of metals in the tunnel are lower than other mine drainage tunnels in the watershed of Catawissa Creek. Construction was planned to occur some time after 2010 if at all.

On April 15, 1975, the concentration of nitrogen in the form nitrates was measured to be 0.08 milligrams per liter in the waters of the Catawissa Tunnel. The concentration of organic carbon was measured to be 13.0 milligrams per liter.

== Other chemical hydrology ==
The discharge of the Catawissa Tunnel is 820,000 gallons per day. The discharge of the tunnel ranges from 4,000 to 10,000 gallons per minute, although it can reach 18,000 gallons per minute during rainfall. This is fairly close to the discharges of the other mine drainage tunnels in the watershed of Catawissa Creek.

The pH of the water discharged from the Catawissa Tunnel ranges from 3.8 to 4.5, with an average of 4.17. The concentration of acidity in the tunnel's water is 18.44 milligrams per liter and the daily load of acidity is 126.1 pounds (57.2 kg). The acidity load requires a 90 percent reduction to meet its total maximum daily load requirements. The concentration of alkalinity is 4.11 milligrams per liter and the daily load of alkalinity is 28.1 pounds (12.7 kg) per day. The concentration of water hardness was measured to be 24.0 milligrams per liter in 1975.

The water temperature of the water discharged from the Catawissa Tunnel was measured to be 7.0 °C (44.6 °F) on April 15, 1975. The specific conductance at this time was 175 micro-siemens per centimeter at 25 °C (77 °F).

== Description and geography ==
The Catawissa Tunnel is entirely in East Union Township. It is approximately 840 feet (260 m) long, making it the shortest mine drainage tunnel in the watershed of Catawissa Creek. The tunnel begins in deep mines in the South Green Mountain Coal Basin and ends at Catawissa Creek in the Catawissa Creek valley. The Catawissa Tunnel is relatively difficult to access. The elevation of the tunnel is 1,440 feet (440 m) above sea level.

The Catawissa Tunnel is approximately 1 mile (1.6 km) upstream of the Audenried Tunnel and 0.9 miles (1.4 km) upstream of the Green Mountain Tunnel. It discharges into Catawissa Creek further upstream than any other mine tunnel in the watershed. The tunnel is less significant than the other mine drainage tunnels in the watershed of Catawissa Creek.

The proposed passive treatment system for the Catawissa Tunnel would be capable of treating 3,000 gallons of water per minute. This would require 1,750 tons per year of limestone rock with high concentrations of calcium carbonate. Assuming a lifespan of 20 years, the limestone for the passive treatment system would cost $360,000. Land reclamation in the area where water enters the Catawissa Tunnel has been proposed. This would reduce the discharge of the tunnel and make it easier to treat the tunnel's water.

The Catawissa Tunnel is near the community of Sheppton.

== History ==
Mining in the North Green Mountain Coal Basin and the South Green Mountain Coal Basin began in the middle of the 1800s. The construction of the Catawissa Tunnel was completed in the early 1930s. It was one of five mine drainage tunnels in the Catawissa Creek watershed to be constructed during this time (the others being the Audenried Tunnel, the Green Mountain Tunnel, the Oneida Number One Tunnel, and the Oneida Number Three Tunnel). Its purpose is to drain water from deep mines in the South Green Mountain Coal Basin via gravity.

Data on the discharge of the Catawissa Tunnel was collected continuously between July 1974 and September 1976. A total maximum daily load for various substances was set for the Catawissa Tunnel in the total maximum daily load document for Catawissa Creek, which was completed in 2003. There are plans to develop a treatment system for the tunnel, although this such plans are not considered to be high-priority. The treatment system for the tunnel is planned to be the last treatment system installed on any mine drainage tunnel in the watershed of Catawissa Creek and the construction of the treatment system is not definite.

The Catawissa Tunnel is not on the Pennsylvania Section 303(d) list of streams that are impaired due to pH.

== See also ==
- Audenried Tunnel coal mining drainage in Luzerne County
- Green Mountain Tunnel coal mining drainage in Schuylkill County
- Jeddo Tunnel coal mining drainage in Luzerne County
- Oneida Number One Tunnel coal mining drainage in Schuylkill County
- Oneida Number Three Tunnel coal mining drainage in Schuylkill County
- Quakake Tunnel coal mining drainage in Carbon County
