= Oneida Number One Tunnel =

Tunnel in Schuylkill County, Pennsylvania, U.S.

Coordinates: 40.9256°N 76.1236°W

- Interactive map of Oneida Number One Tunnel

Overview
- Location: Schuylkill County, Pennsylvania
- Status: abandoned
- Start: North Green Mountain Coal Basin
- End: Sugarloaf Creek between Lake Susquehanna and Lake Choctaw

Operation
- Opened: 1930s

Technical
- Min elevation: 510 feet (160 m)

The Oneida Number One Tunnel (also known as the Oneida Tunnel 1 or the Oneida #1 Tunnel) is a mine drainage tunnel in Schuylkill County, Pennsylvania, in the United States. It is one of five major mine tunnels in the watershed of Catawissa Creek. The tunnel discharges into Sugarloaf Creek near Lake Choctaw and Lake Susquehanna. The water quality of the tunnel's discharge has improved significantly since the installation of a treatment system at the site of the tunnel in 2001.

== Hydrology ==
The Oneida Number One Tunnel is the only source of acid mine drainage to Sugarloaf Creek.

The Oneida Number One Tunnel has a treatment system. This treatment system causes water from the tunnel to flow through an oxic limestone drain, increasing its pH and raising its concentration of alkalinity.

Before the installation of the treatment system, the pH of the Oneida Number One Tunnel had a pH ranging from 4.6 to 4.2. The alkalinity was 0 milligrams per liter and the acidity ranged from 40 to 50 milligrams per liter. The tunnel had trace amounts of iron and an aluminum concentration of 1.4 to 4.9 milligrams per liter.

Following the installation of the treatment system was installed on the Oneida Number One Tunnel, the pH of the tunnel's waters averages 6.5. The alkalinity ranges from 9 to 26 milligrams per liter and the acidity is 0 milligrams per liter. The iron concentration is 0 milligrams per liter and the concentration of aluminum has decreased to 0.70 milligrams per liter. The treatment system has significantly improved the water quality of Lake Choctaw, Sugarloaf Creek, and Tomhicken Creek.

Prior to the installation of the treatment system on the Oneida Number One Tunnel, its discharge ranged from 560 to 3000 gallons per minute.

== Geography and geology ==
The Oneida Number One Tunnel drains the North Green Mountain Coal Basin and is the only tunnel to drain this basin. The tunnel is located in the middle reaches of the watershed of Catawissa Creek. It discharges into Sugarloaf Creek near Lake Choctaw and Lake Susquehanna.

The elevation of the Oneida Number One Tunnel is 510 feet (160 m) above sea level. The tunnel discharges its water into a narrow and deep draw approximately 670 feet (200 m) from Sugarloaf Creek. The tunnel begins in coal mining land in East Union Township, Schuylkill County. It flows north-northwest, crossing under Tomhicken Creek to its other end, which is near the border between East Union Township, Schuylkill County; North Union Township, Schuylkill County, and Black Creek Township, Luzerne County. The tunnel is located in the Eagle Rock Resort. The tunnel is a rock tunnel that causes water to flow from mines in its upper reaches via gravity.

The Oneida Number One Tunnel is the second-largest source of acid mine drainage in the watershed of Catawissa Creek.

The opening of the Oneida Number One Tunnel was collapsed as early as the 1970s.

There are recreational lakes both upstream and downstream of the point where the Oneida Number One Tunnel discharges into Sugarloaf Creek.

The total maximum daily load document for Catawissa Creek suggests reclaiming mined land in the Green Mountain Coal Basin to reduce the discharge of the Oneida Number One Tunnel.

== History ==
The construction of the Oneida Number One Tunnel was completed in the 1930s. It was one of five mine drainage tunnels in the Catawissa Creek watershed to be constructed during this decade (the others being the Audenried Tunnel, the Catawissa Tunnel, the Green Mountain Tunnel, and the Oneida Number Three Tunnel).

A treatment system was constructed for the Oneida Number One Tunnel in July 2001. The treatment system was built by the Catawissa Creek Restoration Association and a number of other organizations. These organizations included the Schuylkill County Conservation District, the Columbia County Conservation District, the Office of Surface Mining, the landowners of the Double Diamond Development Corporation, the Eagle Rock Homeowner's Association, the Eastern Pennsylvania Council on Abandoned Mine Reclamation, and the Natural Resource Conservation Service. The treatment system has significantly reduced the effect of acid mine drainage on Sugarloaf Creek. The total cost of the system was $375,000.

== See also ==
- Audenried Tunnel coal mining drainage in Luzerne County
- Catawissa Tunnel coal mining drainage in Schuylkill County
- Green Mountain Tunnel coal mining drainage in Schuylkill County
- Jeddo Tunnel coal mining drainage in Luzerne County
- Oneida Number Three Tunnel coal mining drainage in Schuylkill County
- Quakake Tunnel coal mining drainage in Carbon County
