= Green Mountain Tunnel =

Tunnel in Schuylkill County, Pennsylvania, U.S.

Coordinates: 40.7167°N 76.0675°W

- Interactive map of Green Mountain Tunnel

Overview
- Start: South Green Mountain Coal Basin in East Union Township, Pennsylvania
- End: Catawissa Creek in East Union Township, Schuylkill County, Pennsylvania

Operation
- Opened: 1930s

Technical
- Length: approximately 4,100 feet (1,200 m)

The Green Mountain Tunnel is a mine drainage tunnel in Schuylkill County, Pennsylvania, in the United States. It is one of five major mine drainage tunnels in the watershed of Catawissa Creek. The tunnel discharges into Catawissa Creek near the Audenried Tunnel and the Catawissa Tunnel. The tunnel was constructed in the 1930s and is slightly less than one mile long.

== Hydrology ==
The average discharge of the Green Mountain Tunnel is 1,440,000 gallons per day (1,000 gallons per minute or 1.75 cubic feet per second). Although a significant majority of the acid mine drainage discharging into Catawissa Creek comes from the Audenried Tunnel, the Green Mountain Tunnel is one of four other mine drainage tunnels that contribute most of the remaining acid mine drainage to the creek.

The pH of the waters of the Green Mountain Tunnel ranges from 3.6 to 4.2, with an average of 4.05. The concentration of acidity in the tunnel's waters is 28.05 milligrams per liter and the daily load of acidity is 337.0 pounds (152.9 kg). The tunnel's acidity load requires a 92 percent reduction to meet its total maximum daily load requirements. The concentration of alkalinity is 3.29 milligrams per liter and the load is 39.5 pounds (17.9 kg) per day.

The concentration of iron in the waters of the Green Mountain Tunnel is 0.44 milligrams per liter and the daily load is 5.3 pounds (2.4 kg). The iron load requires a 49 percent reduction to meet its total maximum daily load requirements. The concentration of manganese in the tunnel's waters is 0.64 milligrams per liter and the load is 7.7 pounds (3.5 kg) per day. The load of manganese requires a 3 percent reduction to meet its total maximum daily load requirements. The concentration of aluminum in the discharge of the tunnel is 2.97 milligrams per liter and the load is 35.7 pounds (16.2 kg) per day. The load of manganese requires an 89 percent reduction to meet its total maximum daily load requirements.

The concentration of hydrogen ions in the waters of the Green Mountain Tunnel is 0.25318 milligrams per liter. The concentration of sulfates ranges from 75.0 to 96.0 milligrams per liter.

The temperature of the water being discharged from the Green Mountain Tunnel was measured to be 9.0 °C (48.2 °F) on April 15, 1975. The water temperature was measured to be 8.5 °C (47.3 °F) on November 7, 1991 at 1:10 P.M. The specific conductance of the tunnel's waters was 210 micro-siemens per centimeter at 25 °C (77 °F) on the former date and 269 micro-siemens per centimeter at 25 °C (77 °F) on the latter date.

== Description and geography ==
The Green Mountain Tunnel is approximately 4,100 feet (1,200 m) long. It is entirely in East Union Township, Pennsylvania and discharges near Catawissa Creek. The location where it discharges into the creek is near where the Audenried Tunnel and the Catawissa Tunnel discharge into the creek. Specifically, it is 328 feet (100 m) from the Audenried Tunnel and 0.9 miles (1.4 km) from the Catawissa Tunnel.

The Green Mountain Tunnel drains the eastern part of the South Green Mountain Coal Basin.

The discharge of the Green Mountain Tunnel is in an undeveloped area.

The Green Mountain Tunnel is near Spies Run.

== History ==
Mining in the North Green Mountain Coal Basin and the South Green Mountain Coal Basin began in the middle of the 1800s. The construction of the Green Mountain Tunnel was completed in the South Green Mountain Coal Basin the early 1930s. It was one of five mine drainage tunnels to be constructed in the watershed of Catawissa Creek during this decade (the others being the Audenried Tunnel, the Catawissa Tunnel, the Oneida Number One Tunnel, and the Oneida Number Three Tunnel). Its original purpose was to drain water from deep mines in the South Green Mountain Coal Basin.

A plan was once conceived to treat one million gallons per day of the waters of the Green Mountain Tunnel to the point that it would be potable and sell it to the Humboldt Industrial Park. This plan would allow the Humboldt Industrial Park to expand and provide 4,800 additional jobs.

In 2000, the Catawissa Creek Restoration Association received $35,000 to construct a vertical flow system for the Green Mountain Tunnel. The Catawissa Creek Restoration Association began making basic plans to construct a treatment system for the Green Mountain Tunnel as early as 2003. The Audenried & Green Mountain Tunnel Wetlands Delineation and Identification was completed in 2004 by the Eastern Pennsylvania Council for Abandoned Mine Reclamation.

The Green Mountain Tunnel is not on the Pennsylvania Section 303(d) list of streams that are impaired due to pH.

== See also ==
- Audenried Tunnel coal mining drainage in Luzerne County
- Catawissa Tunnel coal mining drainage in Schuylkill County
- Jeddo Tunnel coal mining drainage in Luzerne County
- Oneida Number One Tunnel coal mining drainage in Schuylkill County
- Oneida Number Three Tunnel coal mining drainage in Schuylkill County
- Quakake Tunnel coal mining drainage in Carbon County
