= Hunkydory Creek =

River in Pennsylvania, US

Physical characteristics
- Source
  - location: Number 8 Reservoir in Kline Township, Schuylkill County, Pennsylvania
  - elevation: 1,720 ft (520 m)
- Mouth
  - location: Catawissa Creek in Hazle Township, Luzerne County, Pennsylvania
  - elevation: 1,689 ft (515 m)
- Length: 1.4 mi (2.3 km)
- Basin size: 3.65 mi^{2} (9.5 km^{2})

Basin features
- Progression: Catawissa Creek → Susquehanna River → Chesapeake Bay

Hunkydory Creek is a tributary of Catawissa Creek in Schuylkill County and Luzerne County, in Pennsylvania, in the United States. It is approximately 1.4 miles (2.3 km) long and flows through Kline Township in Schuylkill County and Hazle Township in Luzerne County. The watershed of the creek has an area of 3.65 square miles (9.5 km^{2}). The creek is considered to be a Coldwater Fishery. It is likely that it is not inhabited by any species of fish. The main rock formations in the creek's watershed are the Mauch Chunk Formation, the Pottsville Formation, and the Llwellyn Formation and the main soils are the Udorthents Kill soil and the Hezleton soil.

== Course ==
Hunkydory Creek begins at the Number Eight Reservoir in Kline Township, Schuylkill County. It flows north for several dozen feet before turning west-northwest for a few tenths of a mile. The creek then turns north and a few tenths of a mile further downstream, it exits Kline Township and Schuylkill County.

Upon exiting Kline Township and Schuylkill County, Hunkydory Creek enters Hazle Township, Luzerne County. In this township, the creek flows east-northeast, roughly parallel to the border between Luzerne County and Schuylkill County, passing through a small pond. After some distance, it turns northeast and passes through a much larger pond or small lake. At the northeastern corner of the lake, the creek loses its flow for a short distance before regaining it in another pond. On the northern edge of the pond, the creek loses its flow for a few tenths of a mile. It then reaches its confluence with Catawissa Creek.

Hunkydory Creek joins Catawissa Creek 40.86 miles (65.76 km) upstream of its mouth.

== Hydrology ==
Hunkydory Creek is considered by the Pennsylvania Department of Environmental Protection to be impaired by abandoned mine drainage and mining for 0.26775 miles (0.43090 km). The creek's designated use is aquatic life and the creek is not considered to be attaining the standards for this use.

== Geography and geology ==
The elevation near the mouth of Hunkydory Creek is 1,689 feet (515 m) above sea level. The elevation of the creek's source is just over 1,720 feet (520 m) above sea level.

Hunkydory Creek flows through spoil piles and unreclaimed mining land for most of its length. However, there are several rock formations in the watershed. The Mauch Chunk Formation is present in the watershed's western and southernmost parts. This rock formation consists of siltstone, sandstone, grayish-red shale, and conglomerate. The Pottsville Formation is found in its central and southwestern parts. This rock formation contains claystone, limestone, conglomerate, shale, and gray sandstone. Parts of the watershed's eastern section have rock of the Llewellyn Formation. Most of the watershed of the creek is on anthracite.

Hunkydory Creek flows over Udorthents soil for its entire length. Nearly all of the watershed is also on this type of soil. However, its southernmost part is on Hazleton soil.

The mouth of Hunkydory Creek is in an active strip mine. The lower reaches of the creek in Luzerne County are flanked by land that is prone to flooding during a 100 year flood. The land immediately south of the Number Eight Reservoir is also prone to flooding during a 100-year flood.

Hunkydory Creek is a small creek. It has a low gradient of 5.2 meters per kilometer (27.5 feet per mile), the lowest gradient of any tributary of Catawissa Creek. The creek loses its entire flow in some places where it passes through deep mines. The creek's flow enters strip pits or broken strata, where it enters the Audenried Tunnel and flows into Catawissa Creek in the form of acid mine drainage.

The mouth of Hunkydory Creek is at the headwaters of Catawissa Creek.

== Watershed ==
The watershed of Hunkydory Creek has an area of 3.65 square miles (9.5 km^{2}). Most of the watershed is in Kline Township, Schuylkill County. However, small areas of it are in East Union Township, Schuylkill County, Hazle Township, Luzerne County, and Banks Township, Carbon County. The entirety of the borough of McAdoo is also in the watershed of the creek.

The lower reaches of Hunkydory Creek are near the community of Kelyres. A reservoir known as Reservoir No. 8 is in the upper reaches of the creek's watershed, at its headwaters. The creek is in the United States Geological Survey quadrangle of Conyngham.

The major roads in the watershed of Hunkydory Creek are Pennsylvania Route 309 and Interstate 81. Pennsylvania Route 309 traverses the eastern part of the watershed in a north–south direction. Interstate 81 traverses the western part of the watershed in a north–south direction. 70 percent of the creek's length is within 100 metres (330 ft) of a road and 90 percent is within 300 metres (980 ft) of one. Its entire length is within 500 metres (1,600 ft) of a road.

In 1990, the population density of the watershed of Hunkydory Creek was 238 people per square kilometer (620 people per square mile), making it the most population-dense sub-watershed in the Catawissa Creek drainage basin. No portion of Hunkydory Creek is accessible to be public.

== History and industries ==
Nearly all of the watershed of Hunkydory Creek has been mined. In 2003, the TMDL document for Catawissa Creek suggested reclaiming the land in the vicinity of the creek and restoring its stream channels. The purpose of this was to reduce the discharge of the Audenreid Tunnel.

== Biology ==
Hunkydory Creek is considered by the Pennsylvania Department of Environmental Protection to be a Coldwater Fishery. It is also considered to be a Migratory Fishery. A 1997 report stated that the creek was unlikely to contain any fish, although the creators of the report were unable to search for fish in it due to the fact that it is entirely on private strip mining land. The creek is closed to fishing.

== See also ==
- Cross Run, next tributary of Catawissa Creek going downstream
- List of tributaries of Catawissa Creek
