= Lake Choctaw =

- Location within Pennsylvania Location within the United States
- Location: Luzerne County and Schuylkill County, Pennsylvania
- Coordinates: 40°55′46″N 76°07′49″W
- Type: manmade lake
- Primary inflows: Sugarloaf Creek
- Primary outflows: Sugarloaf Creek
- Surface area: 22.1 acres (8.9 ha)
- Shore length^{1}: 0.85 miles (1.37 km)
- Surface elevation: 1,266 feet (386 m)
- ^{1} Shore length is not a well-defined measure.

Lake Choctaw is a manmade lake and reservoir in Luzerne County and Schuylkill County in Pennsylvania, in the United States. It has a surface area of 22.1 acres. The lake is situated on Sugarloaf Creek. In the past, the lake had poor water quality and a low pH. However, after the installation of a treatment system on the nearby Oneida Number One Tunnel, the water quality rapidly improved and fish were introduced into it.

== Geography and geology ==
The elevation of Lake Choctaw is 1,266 feet (386 m) above sea level. The lake is on Sugarloaf Creek, but also receives water from the Oneida Number One Tunnel.

The only rock formation in the vicinity of Lake Choctaw is the Mauch Chunk Formation. The only soil in the vicinity of the lake is the Hazleton soil. There are some areas prone to flooding immediately south of the lake. However, there are no such areas immediately north of the lake.

The land immediately north and east of Lake Choctaw has a zoning designation of C-1. The land immediately south and west of the lake mainly has the zoning designations of C and R.

Lake Choctaw is dammed by an impoundment. The dam is known as the Lake Choctaw Dam. The dam was considered to be unsafe in 1979. The lake is manmade.

== Hydrology ==
Lake Choctaw was historically highly acidic. However, in modern times, it has become alkaline, with a high pH and concentration of alkalinity. It also has a low concentration of aluminum. Additionally, the lake serves as an oxidation/precipitation basin, helping to remove aluminum from the water discharged by the Oneida Number One Tunnel.

Lake Choctaw has been described as "once-dead, [and] totally acidified". However, more recently, its water quality was described as "very good" in the TMDL for Catawissa Creek. The water quality of the lake is expected to improve further in the future.

The pH of Lake Choctaw was between 4.5 and 5.0 prior to the installation of a treatment system at the Oneida Number One Tunnel in 2000. Two months after the installation of the treatment system, it increased to between 6.5 and 7.0.

== History ==
In the late 20th or early 21st century, the Catawissa Creek Restoration Association was involved in a plan to restore the water quality of Lake Choctaw, along with Sugarloaf Creek, Tomhicken Creek, and Catawissa Creek, using a passive treatment system.

== Biology ==
Historically, Lake Choctaw was an infertile lake. However, in modern times, it is stocked with fish provided by the Zion Grove Trout Fishery. These fish include brook trout, brown trout, rainbow trout, and minnows. Freshwater jellyfish were observed in the lake in 2007. Additionally, aquatic insects inhabit the lake.

== See also ==
- List of lakes in Pennsylvania
