= Sugarloaf Creek =

Tributary of Tomhicken Creek in Luzerne and Schuylkill counties, Pennsylvania

- Location of Sugarloaf Creek mouth Sugarloaf Creek (the United States)

Physical characteristics
- Source
  - location: Valley in Hazle Township, Luzerne County, Pennsylvania, U.S.
  - elevation: 1,460 ft (450 m)
- Mouth
  - location: Tomhicken Creek in North Union Township, Schuylkill County, Pennsylvania, U.S.
  - coordinates: 40°55′35″N 76°09′03″W
  - elevation: 1,014 ft (309 m)
- Length: 3.5 mi (5.6 km)
- Basin size: 3.34 sq mi (8.7 km^{2})

Basin features
- Progression: Tomhicken Creek → Catawissa Creek → Susquehanna River → Chesapeake Bay

Sugarloaf Creek is a tributary of Tomhicken Creek in Luzerne County and Schuylkill County, in Pennsylvania, in the United States. It is approximately 3.5 miles (5.6 km) long and flows through Hazle Township and Black Creek Township in Luzerne County and North Union Township in Schuylkill County.

The watershed of the stream has an area of 3.34 square miles (8.7 km^{2}). The stream is considered to be a Coldwater Fishery. The main rock formation in the stream's watershed are the Mauch Chunk Formation and the main soil is the Hazleton soil. The creek has been impaired by acid mine drainage from the Oneida Number One Tunnel.

== Course ==
Sugarloaf Creek begins in a broad valley in Hazle Township, Luzerne County, with Little Sugarloaf Mountain to the north. It flows west for a few tenths of a mile before receiving an unnamed tributary. It then continues west and a short distance later exits Hazle Township and enters Black Creek Township, Luzerne County. The creek continues west, soon receiving another unnamed tributary and then entering Lake Susquehanna. The creek exits the lake on its southwestern corner, leaving Black Creek Township and Luzerne County. It enters North Union Township, Schuylkill County and then turns north for a few hundred feet, reentering Black Creek Township, Luzerne County. The creek then turns west and enters Lake Choctaw, where it reenters North Union Township, Schuylkill County. On the western side of the lake, the creek continues west-southwest for nearly a mile. It then turns northwest and reaches its confluence with Tomhicken Creek after a few tenths of a mile.

Sugarloaf Creek joins Tomhicken Creek 5.08 miles (8.18 km) upstream of its mouth.

== Hydrology ==
Sugarloaf Creek is considered to be impaired for aquatic life by acid mine drainage/pH in its upper reaches. All of the acid mine drainage comes from the Oneida Number One Tunnel. The creek is one of the sources of acid mine drainage that flows into Tomhicken Creek.

Sugarloaf Creek is highly acidic due to its impairment by acid mine drainage. It has a pH of 5.0 and the concentration of alkalinity in the creek is 0 milligrams per liter. The concentration of water hardness in the creek is greater than 150 milligrams per liter.

Sugarloaf Creek experiences pollution.

At 11:35 A.M. on July 11, 1997, the air temperature in the vicinity of Sugarloaf Creek was measured to be 24 °C (75 °F). The water temperature of the creek at that time was 20.3 °C (68.5 °F). The specific conductance of the creek's waters is 117 umhos.

== Geography and geology ==
The elevation near the mouth of Sugarloaf Creek is 1,014 feet (309 m) above sea level. The elevation at the source of the creek is 1,460 feet (450 m) above sea level.

Sugarloaf Creek flows entirely over rock of the Mauch Chunk Formation. The entirety of the watershed of the creek is on Hazleton soil.

Sugarloaf Creek is a small creek, with a width of 3.6 metres (12 ft). It has a moderate gradient of 24.2 meters per kilometer.

Some areas near Sugarloaf Creek are prone to flooding. There are three impoundments on the creek.

== Watershed and history ==
The watershed of Sugarloaf Creek has an area of 3.34 square miles (8.7 km^{2}). The majority of the watershed is in Hazle Township, Luzerne County and Black Creek Township, Luzerne County. However, a substantial portion of it is in North Union Township, Schuylkill County and East Union Township, Schuylkill County.

Sugarloaf Creek is in the United States Geological Survey quadrangles of Nuremberg and Conyngham.

There are two major lakes on Sugarloaf Creek. They are known as Lake Susquehanna and Lake Choctaw. The Oneida Number 1 Tunnel discharges into Sugarloaf Creek as it flows between Lake Susquehanna and Lake Choctaw.

84 percent of the length of Sugarloaf Creek is within 100 metres (330 ft) of a road. The entirety of the creek is within 300 metres (980 ft) of a road. In 1990, the population density of the creek's watershed was 164 people per square kilometer.

A resort known as Eagle Rock is situated on Sugarloaf Creek. Substantial development occurred in this area in the 1990s. The headwaters of the creek are in a residential area. The mouth of the creek is near Millers Corner. The Catawissa Creek Restoration Association applied limestone sand to Sugarloaf Creek in 1997. The creek was later neutralized. A 1999 newspaper article estimated the restoration of Sugarloaf Creek to cost $205,000.

== Biology ==
Sugarloaf Creek is considered by the Pennsylvania Department of Environmental Protection to be a Coldwater Fishery. However, no fish life has been observed in it. A 1997 report stated that the creek was a poor site for angling.

== See also ==
- Little Crooked Run, next tributary of Tomhicken Creek going downstream
- Little Tomhicken Creek, next tributary of Tomhicken Creek going upstream
