= Little Crooked Run =

River in Pennsylvania, United States

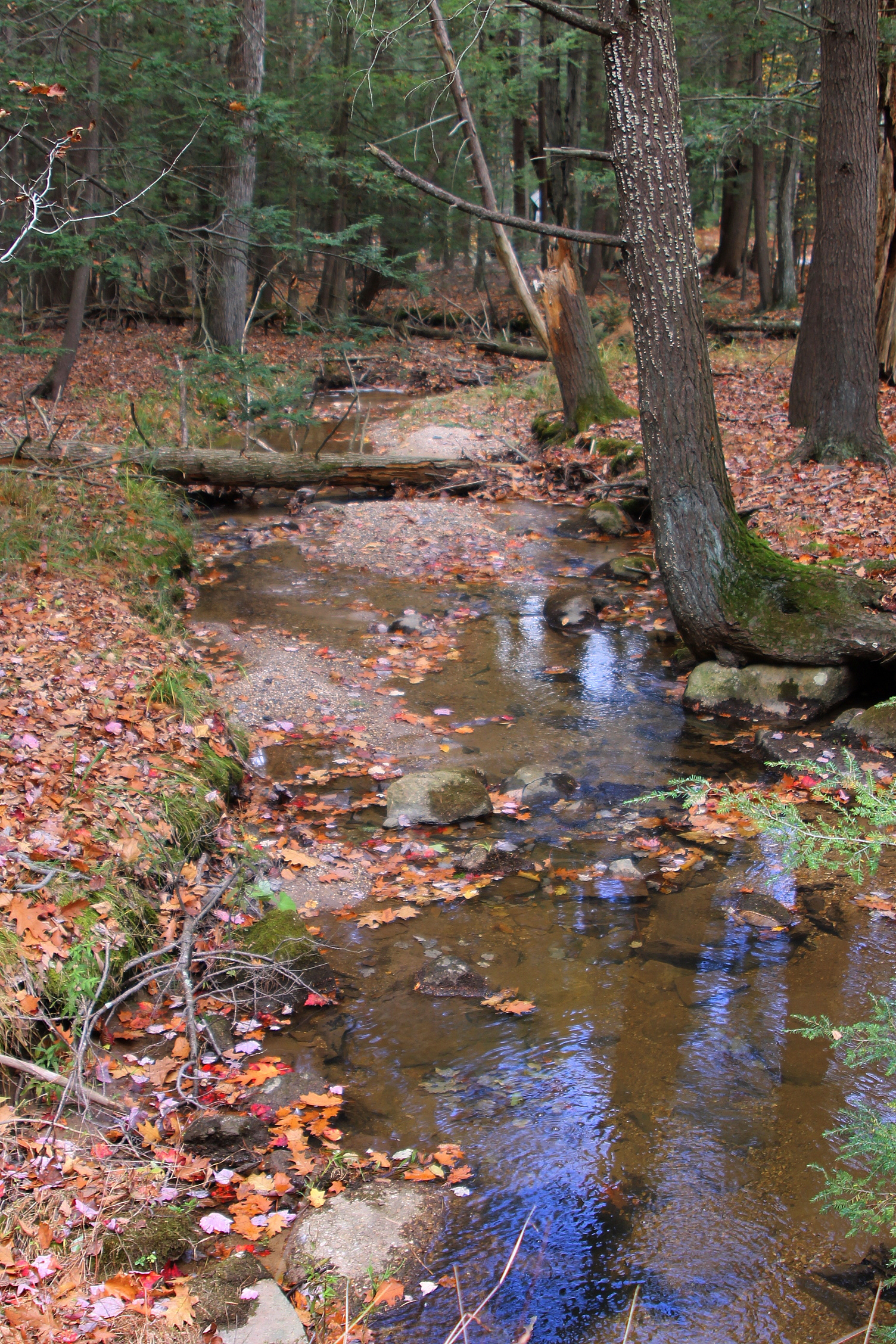
- Little Crooked Run

Physical characteristics
- Source
  - location: valley in southeastern North Union Township, Schuylkill County, Pennsylvania
  - elevation: 1,480 ft (450 m)
- Mouth
  - location: Tomhicken Creek in North Union Township, Schuylkill County, Pennsylvania
  - coordinates: 40°55′47″N 76°09′15″W
  - elevation: 997 ft (304 m)
- Length: 1.7 mi (2.7 km)
- Basin size: 1.22 sq mi (3.2 km^{2})

Basin features
- Progression: Tomhicken Creek → Catawissa Creek → Susquehanna River → Chesapeake Bay

Little Crooked Run is a tributary of Tomhicken Creek in Schuylkill County, Pennsylvania, in the United States. It is approximately 1.7 miles (2.7 km) long and flows through North Union Township. The watershed of the stream has an area of 1.22 square miles (3.2 km^{2}). The stream is considered to be a High-Quality Coldwater Fishery and Class A Wild Trout Waters. The main rock formations in the stream's watershed are the Mauch Chunk Formation and the Pottsville Formation and the main soil is the Hazleton soil.

== Course ==
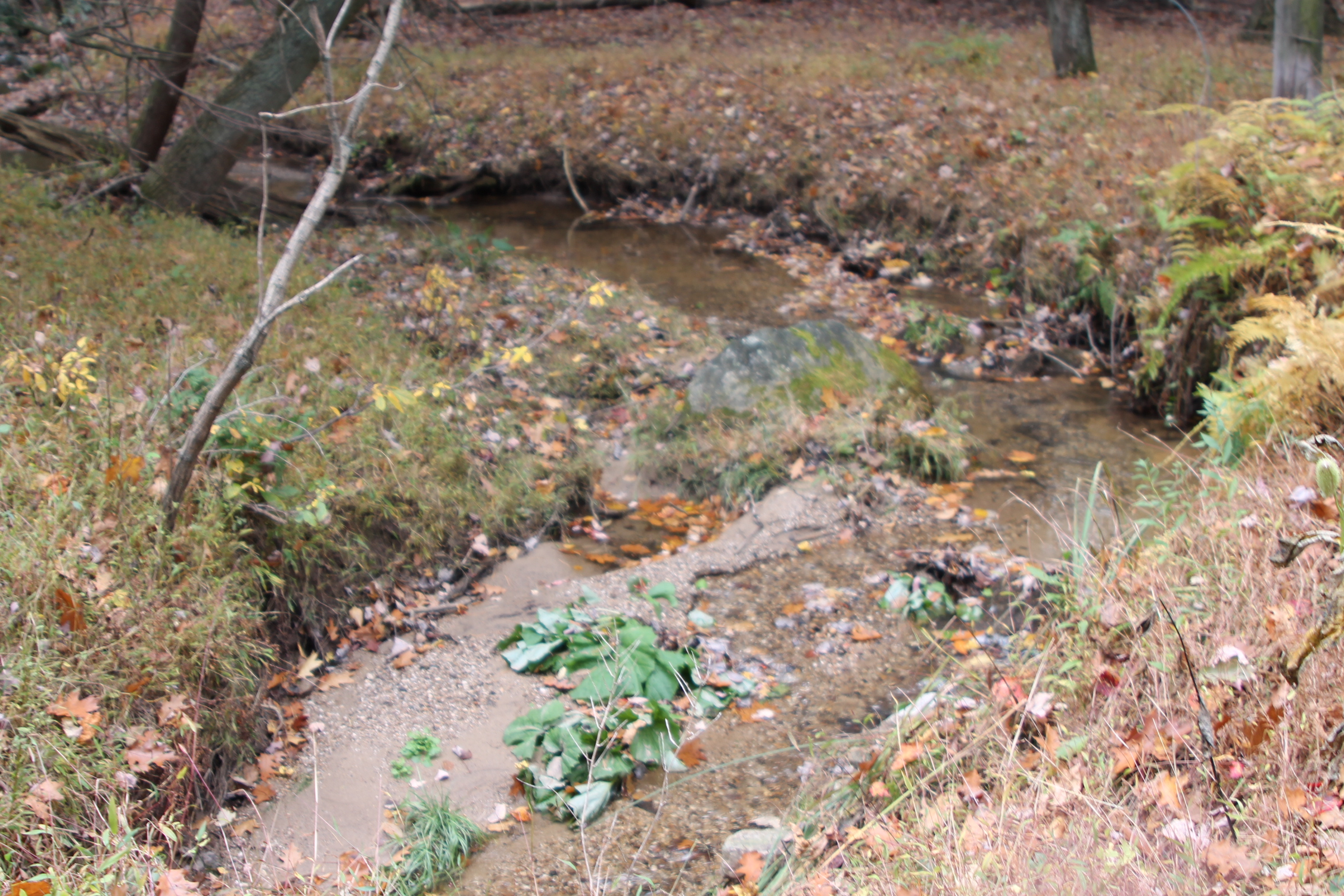
Little Crooked Run looking upstream in its lower reaches

Little Crooked Run begins a in a valley in southeastern North Union Township, a few hundred feet from the border between North Union Township and East Union Township. The stream flows northeast for a few tenths of a mile before turning north and slightly west and leaving the valley. After several tenths of a mile, it crosses Miller Road and T872. A short distance downstream, it reaches its confluence with Tomhicken Creek.

Little Crooked Run joins Tomhicken Creek 4.79 miles (7.71 km) upstream of its mouth.

== Hydrology ==
Little Crooked Run is not considered to be impaired. However, it is infertile and acidic, and has the potential to be affected by acid precipitation.

The concentration of alkalinity in Little Crooked Run is 4 milligrams per liter. The pH of the stream is 6.6. The level of water hardness in its waters is 6 milligrams per liter.

At 12:25 P.M. on July 11, 1997, the air temperature in the vicinity of Little Crooked Run was measured to be 30 °C (86 °F). The water temperature of the stream at that time was measured to be 15.3 °C (59.5 °F). The specific conductivity of its waters is 32 umhos.

== Geography and geology ==
The elevation near the mouth of Little Crooked Run is 997 feet (304 m) above sea level. The elevation at the source of the stream is just over 1,480 feet (450 m) above sea level.

The entire length of Little Crooked Run is on rock of the Mauch Chunk Formation. However, an area of rock of the Pottsville Formation is also found near the stream. The stream flows over Hazleton soil for its entire length.

Little Crooked Run is a small stream, with a width of 1.8 metres (5.9 ft). It has a high gradient of 57.4 meters per kilometer. Some areas in the vicinity of Little Crooked Run in its lower reaches are prone to flooding. However, few other areas in the watershed of the stream are prone to flooding. A mountain known as Green Mountain is present at the headwaters of the stream.

== Watershed and history ==
The watershed of Little Crooked Run has an area of 1.22 square miles (3.2 km^{2}). Most of the watershed is in North Union Township. However, a small portion of it is in East Union Township. There are some agricultural lands to the west of the stream in its middle reaches. A residential area is situated near the headwaters of the stream.

Little Crooked Run is in the United States Geological Survey quadrangle of Nuremberg.

Major roads in the watershed of Little Crooked Run include Nuremberg Mountain Road, which runs along the northeastern border of the watershed. 40 percent of the length of the stream is within 100 metres (330 ft) of a road, 59 percent is within 300 metres (980 ft) of a road, and 71 percent is within 500 metres (1,600 ft) of a road. The population density of the watershed in 1990 was 22 people per square kilometer.

In the 1990s, there was a period of residential development in the vicinity of the headwaters of Little Crooked Run.

== Biology ==
Little Crooked Run is considered by the Pennsylvania Department of Environmental Protection to be a High-Quality Coldwater Fishery, but was historically only considered to be a Coldwater Fishery. Additionally, it is considered by the Pennsylvania Fish and Boat Commission to be Class A Wild Trout Waters.

The only species of fish inhabiting Little Crooked Run is brook trout, which are wild as opposed to being stocked. The biomass of wild brook trout in the stream is 52.74 kilograms per hectare, including 46.64 kilograms per hectare of trout that are less than 175 millimeters long and 6.10 kilograms per hectare that are more than 175 millimeters long. The lengths of the trout range from 25 to 199 millimeters. There are 889 wild brook trout per kilometer in the stream. 869 of them are less than 175 millimeters long and 20 are more than 175 millimeters long. The total number of fish per hectare is 4544, of which 4444 are less than 175 millimeters long and 100 are more than 175 millimeters long.

== See also ==
- Sugarloaf Creek, next tributary of Tomhicken Creek going upstream
- Raccoon Creek (Tomhicken Creek), next tributary of Tomhicken Creek going downstream
