= Audenried Tunnel =

Overview
- Location: East Union Township, Pennsylvania, U.S.
- Start: Jeansville Coal Basin
- End: Upper reaches of Catawissa Creek

Operation
- Work began: 1928
- Opened: 1931

Technical
- Length: 3.05 m (10.0 ft)
- Tunnel clearance: 9 ft (2.7 m)
- Width: 12 ft (3.7 m)

The Audenried Tunnel, also known as the Audenried Mine Tunnel, is a drainage tunnel located in East Union Township, Schuylkill County, Pennsylvania, in the United States. It is approximately three miles long and drains the western portion of a coal basin near Kelayres.

It is among the largest sources of acid mine drainage into Catawissa Creek. It also contributes up to 80% of the acidity to Catawissa Creek. The Audenried Tunnel's pH is approximately 4. However, there have been somewhat successful attempts at treating the tunnel outflow in the 21st century. The bedrock in the vicinity of the tunnel is mostly shale and sandstone.

== Location and description ==
The Audenried Tunnel is 16,150 feet (4,920 m) long. The tunnel runs between Audenried Mine and the watershed of Catawissa Creek. It is filled with debris and the air inside the tunnel is not breathable. The tunnel roughly follows the synclinal axis of the coal basin it is in. The tunnel drains the Jeansville Coal Basin, which is located between Hazleton and McAdoo.

The Audenried Tunnel is located approximately 2 miles (3.2 km) east of the community of Sheppton, Pennsylvania. The tunnel is 12.0 feet (3.7 m) in width and 9.0 feet (2.7 m) in height.

When the Audenried Tunnel was first built, the first 350 feet (110 m) were fully lined with timber due to the low quality of the rock in that part of the tunnel. The next 150 feet (46 m) were also supported by timber, but to a lesser extent.

In 1931, the Glen Alden Coal Company reported that 8,499 feet (2,590 m) from the mouth of the Audenried Tunnel, there was a fissure that discharged close to 800 gallons (approximately 211 liters) per minute. It is possible that there is a fault at this location.

The Audenried Tunnel is the most downstream mine drainage tunnel to discharge into Catawissa Creek.

== Hydrology ==
The Audenried Tunnel discharges into Catawissa Creek near where the Green Mountain Tunnel and the Catawissa Tunnel discharge into the creek. The Audenried Tunnel discharges in a strip mine not far from Catawissa Creek's headwaters. All of the mine workings in the Jeansville Coal Basin likely drain into the tunnel, as does some water from the surface. The discharge from the Audenried Tunnel contributes currently as much as 80% of the acid flowing through Catawissa Creek, with previous studies showing up to 84%. The average discharge of the tunnel is 12.22 million gallons per day, or about 8500 gallons per minute. However, during heavy rainstorms, the discharge can reach 300,000 gallons per minute. The pH of the water in the tunnel ranges between 3.8 and 4.1. The average pH is 4.03.

The total concentration of iron in the waters at the confluence of the Audenried Tunnel and Catawissa Creek is 0.7 milligrams per liter, which equates to a load of 71.3 pounds (32.3 kg) per day. The total maximum daily load for iron is 57.1 pounds (25.9 kg) per day, which is 21% less than the current load. The total concentration of manganese at the confluence is 2.28 milligrams per liter, which equates to a load of 232.4 pounds (105.4 kg) per day. The total maximum daily load for manganese is 73% less than the current daily load. The total concentration of aluminum is 7.93 milligrams per liter, which equates to a load of 808.2 pounds (366.6 kg) per day. The total maximum daily load for aluminum is 40.8 pounds (18.5 kg), which is 95% less than the current daily load. The total concentration of acidity is 68.08 milligrams per liter, which equates to 6,938.4 pounds (3,147.2 kg) per day. The total maximum daily load for acidity is 69.3 pounds (31.4 kg), which is 99% less than the current load. The total concentration of alkalinity is 2.31 milligrams per liter, which equates to 235.4 pounds (106.8 kg) per day. The total concentration of sulfates in the discharge is 136.25 milligrams per liter.

== History ==
The Glen Alden Coal Company commenced construction of the Audenried Tunnel in 1928. Construction of the tunnel finished in 1931. The tunnel was originally created to decrease the elevation of the area's water table without resorting to the use of pumps, thus allowing the drilling of deep coal mine shafts. It was successful in doing this, but rendered 33 miles (53 km) of Catawissa Creek devoid of life for 75 years.

An attempt was made to map the Audenried Tunnel in 1971. However, the attempt was aborted after 1,300 feet (400 m) due to the presence of debris that was impassible. Plans were made in 1974 to plug the tunnel.

In 2006, part of the treatment plant at the mouth of the Audenried Tunnel was buried by a landslide, putting it out of commission.

=== Attempts at restoration and treatment ===
One plan to reduce the discharge rate of the Audenried Tunnel is to reclaim land and create stream channels for Hunkydory Creek and two unnamed tributaries of Catawissa Creek. There are plans to test a way to neutralize the water in the Audenried Tunnel. The Audenried Tunnel AMD Treatment Project began in the summer of 2005, with the aim of treating the outflow of the Audenried Tunnel. The Eastern Pennsylvania Coalition for Abandoned Mine Reclamation gained $150,000 from the Office of Surface Mining for the project. The treatment cost approximately $1,900,000 and is the largest acid mine drainage treatment system in the Coal Region. Around 2000, plans were made to reroute Catawissa Creek away from the tunnel.

The Audenried Tunnel AMD Treatment Project takes in water from the Audenried Tunnel and puts it in three concrete tanks that are 120 feet (37 m) wide and 10 feet (3.0 m) deep. The tanks are filled with 4500 tons of limestone. The treatment system raises the pH of the water by 30%. Ed Rendell, the governor of Pennsylvania when this project was worked on, granted $200,000 to the project.

== Geology ==
The bedrock around the Audenried Tunnel includes red shale, sandy shale, which are both clay-like or silt-like. The shale is more weathered near the mouth of the tunnel. The bedrock near the tunnel also includes sandstone belonging to the Mauch Chunk Formation. Between 1,000 feet (300 m) and 1,200 feet (370 m), the bedrock around the tunnel is largely sandstone.

Up to 8,499 feet (2,590 m), the rock near the Audenried Tunnel is mostly interbedded red shale and sandstone. However, there is also a 29 feet (8.8 m) layer of conglomerate.

== See also ==
- Catawissa Tunnel coal mining drainage in Schuylkill County
- Green Mountain Tunnel coal mining drainage in Schuylkill County
- Jeddo Tunnel coal mining drainage in Luzerne County
- Oneida Number One Tunnel coal mining drainage in Schuylkill County
- Oneida Number Three Tunnel coal mining drainage in Schuylkill County
- Quakake Tunnel coal mining drainage in Carbon County
