= Little Tomhicken Creek =

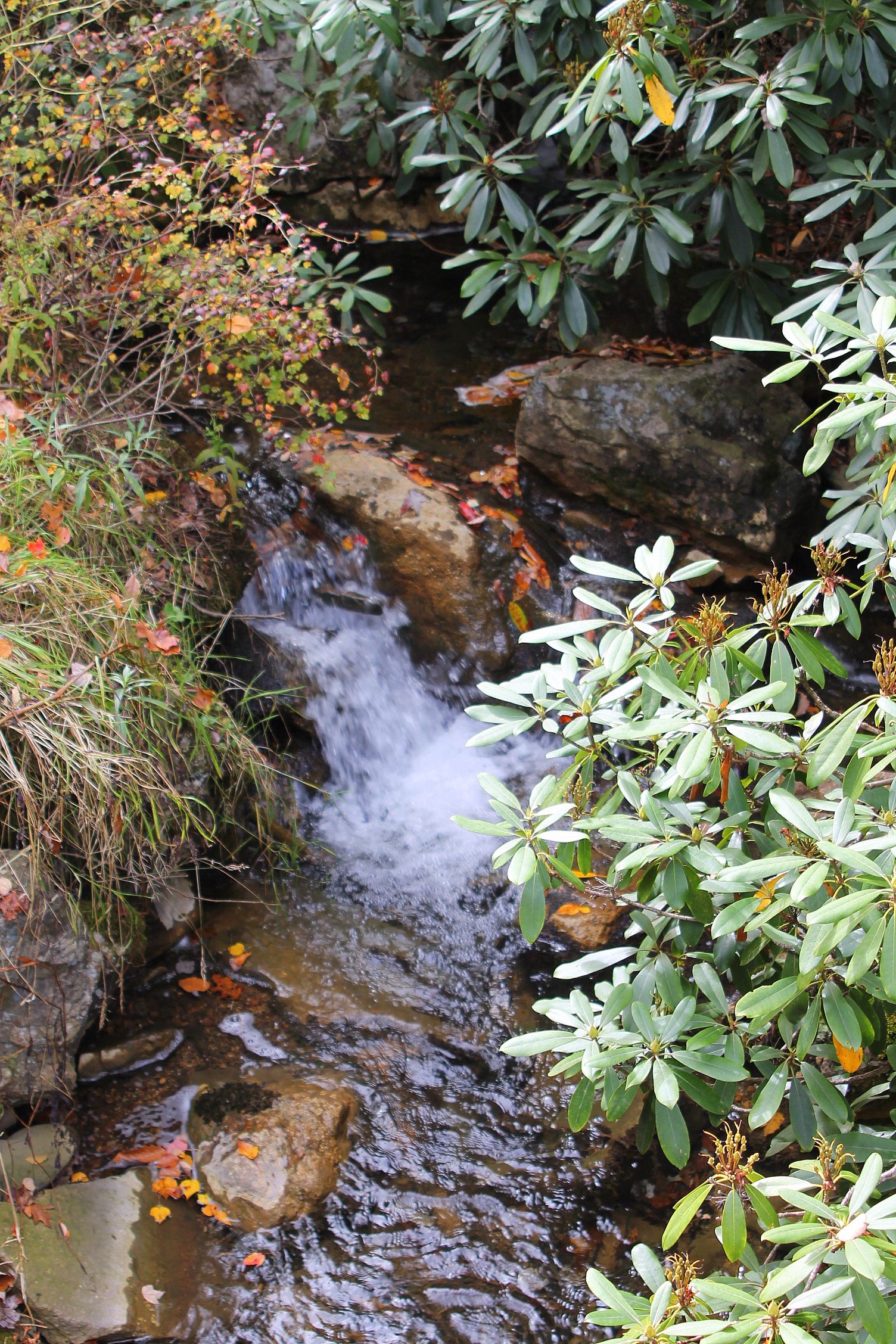
- Little Tomhicken Creek looking upstreamin its middle reaches

Physical characteristics
- Source
  - location: strip mine on Green Mountain in East Union Township, Schuylkill County, Pennsylvania
  - elevation: 1,500 to 1,520 feet (460 to 460 m)
- Mouth
  - location: Tomhicken Creek in North Union Township, Schuylkill County, Pennsylvania
  - coordinates: 40°54′59″N 76°08′36″W
  - elevation: 1,200 ft (370 m)
- Length: 1.0 mi (1.6 km)
- Basin size: 4.31 sq mi (11.2 km^{2})

Basin features
- Progression: Tomhicken Creek → Catawissa Creek → Susquehanna River → Chesapeake Bay

Little Tomhicken Creek is a tributary of Tomhicken Creek in Schuylkill County, Pennsylvania, in the United States. It is approximately 1.0 mile (1.6 km) long and flows through East Union Township and North Union Township. The watershed of the stream has an area of 4.31 square miles (11.2 km^{2}). The creek is considered to be a Coldwater Fishery. However, it is devoid of fish life and is impaired by acid mine drainage. It also has low water quality. The main rock formations in the creek's watershed are the Mauch Chunk Formation and the Pottsville Formation and the main soil is the Hazleton soil. Nearly all of the creek's length is fairly close to a road.

== Course ==
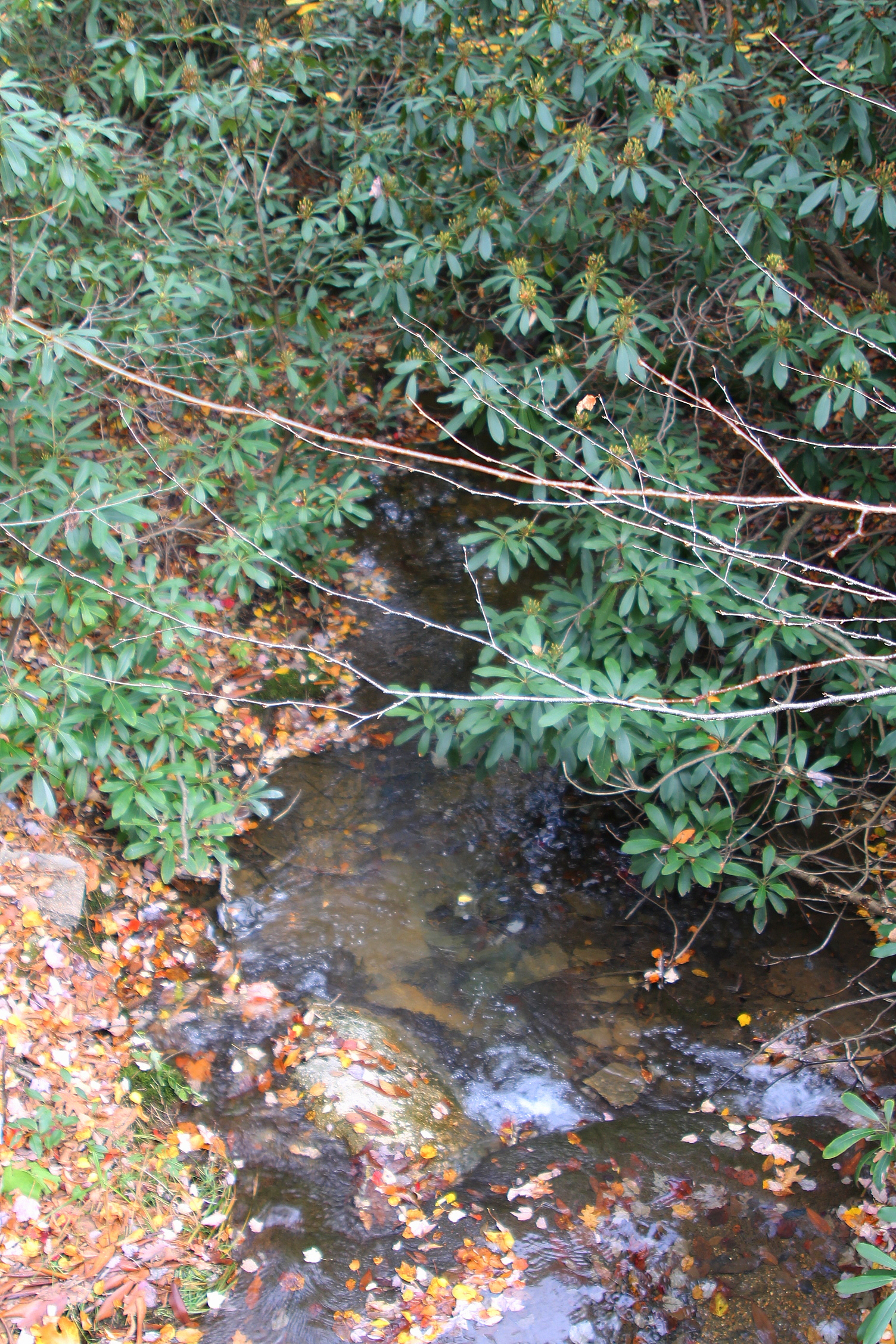
Little Tomhicken Creek looking downstream in its middle reaches

Little Tomhicken Creek begins in a strip mine on Green Mountain near Cove Mountain Drive in East Union Township. It flows north for a few hundred feet, almost immediately entering a valley. It then turns northeast for a few hundred feet before turning north again and flowing parallel to Nuremberg Road for several tenths of a mile. The creek then enters North Union Township and continues north. A few hundred feet downstream, it reaches its confluence with Tomhicken Creek.

Little Tomhicken Creek joins Tomhicken Creek 6.03 miles (9.70 km) upstream of its mouth.

== Hydrology ==
Little Tomhicken Creek is considered by the Pennsylvania Department of Environmental Protection to be impaired for aquatic life by acid mine drainage and pH. There is one source of acid mine drainage in the watershed near the mouth of the creek. Strip mines at its headwaters also contribute acid mine drainage making the creek highly acidic and significantly degrading its water quality.

The pH of Little Tomhicken Creek is 4.4. The concentration of alkalinity in the creek is 0 milligrams per liter. The water hardness is 22 milligrams per liter.

At 1:20 P.M. on July 8, 1997, the air temperature in the vicinity of Little Tomhicken Creek 0.52 miles (0.84 km) upstream of its mouth was 30 °C (86 °F). The water temperature of the creek at that place and time was 15.5 °C (59.9 °F). The specific conductance of its waters is 107 μmhos.

== Geography and geology ==
The elevation near the mouth of Little Tomhicken Creek is 1,200 feet (370 m) above sea level. The elevation of the source of the creek is between 1,500 feet (460 m) and 1,520 feet (460 m). Most of the watershed of the creek is at a high elevation relative to the rest of the watershed of Catawissa Creek.

The main rock formations in the watershed of Little Tomhicken Creek are the Mauch Chunk Formation and the Pottsville Formation. The watershed of the creek is mainly on Hazleton soil. There are few areas prone to flooding in the watershed. The headwaters of the creek are near a mountain known as Green Mountain. A mine tunnel known as the Oneida Number 3 Tunnel discharges into Little Tomhicken Creek. This tunnel is the second-largest acid mine drainage discharge in the watershed of Catawissa Creek.

Little Tomhicken Creek is a small creek with a width of 4.6 ft (1.4 m), making it the narrowest named stream in the watershed of Catawissa Creek. It has a high gradient of 310 ft/mi (59 m/km).

== Watershed and history ==
The watershed of Little Tomhicken Creek has an area of 4.31 square miles (11.2 km^{2}). Most of the watershed is in East Union Township. However, the northern and western parts of it are in North Union Township. There is an area of agricultural land near the headwaters of the creek.

Nuremberg Road runs parallel to Little Tomhicken Creek for much of the creek's length. Additionally, Chapel Road is in the northern part of the watershed and Pennsylvania Route 924 passes through the watershed in a north-south direction. 91 percent of the creek's length is within 330 ft (100 m) of a road and 100 percent of its length is within 980 ft (300 m) of a road. In 1990, the population density of the watershed was 21 people per square kilometer.

Little Tomhicken Creek is in the United States Geological Survey quadrangle of Nuremberg.

In the 1990s, there was a period of development at the headwaters of Little Tomhicken Creek. In December 2009, a passive treatment system was installed on the Oneida Number Three Tunnel. However, heavy rain and erosion in March 2011 rendered it useless.

As of August 1, 2014, the East Union Township Sewer Authority has authorization to discharge material from the East Union Township Wastewater Treatment Plant into Little Tomhicken Creek. The authorization will expires on at midnight on July 31, 2019.

== Biology ==
Little Tomhicken Creek is considered by the Pennsylvania Department of Environmental Protection to be a Coldwater Fishery. A 1997 report advised against further management actions on the creek due to its low water quality. The creek is also not managed by the Pennsylvania Fish and Boat Commission for the same reason. Due to acid mine drainage, no portion of the creek is able to support a usable fishery and it is devoid of any fish life.

A 1997 report stated that Little Tomhicken Creek was a poor site for angling.

Rainbow trout inhabited Little Tomhicken Creek in the early 20th century.

== See also ==
- Sugarloaf Creek, next tributary of Tomhicken Creek going downstream
