= Hydrology of the Catawissa Tunnel =

Mine drainage tunnel in Schuylkill County, US

The Catawissa Tunnel is a mine drainage tunnel in Schuylkill County, Pennsylvania, in the United States. Its properties include the discharge, the pH, the chemical hydrology, and the water temperature. A total of 30 different metals and metalloids have been observed in the tunnel's waters. The hydrological data comes from a gauge on the tunnel at a location of 40°54'39" north and 76°03'59" west and an elevation of 1,440 feet (440 m) above sea level. Some of the most abundant metals in the waters of the tunnel include iron, aluminum, and manganese. These metals have concentrations on the order of several milligrams per liter. A number of other metals have concentrations on the order of micrograms per liter and some metals are found in even lower concentrations. Nonmetals such as nitrates, sulfates, fluorides, chlorides, and silica are also present in the tunnel. The concentrations of such nonmetals range between several micrograms per liter and several milligrams per liter.

The discharge of the Catawissa Tunnel is similar to the discharges of other mine drainage tunnels in the watershed of Catawissa Creek, being on the order of several thousand gallons per minute. However, it can become significantly higher during times of heavy rainfall. Additionally, the tunnel is highly acidic, with a pH averaging slightly more than 4.

== Background ==
Coal mining began in the South Green Mountain Coal Basin in the middle of the 1800s. The Catawissa Tunnel was constructed in the 1930s to drain the aforementioned coal basin via gravity.

== Metals and metalloids ==
The concentrations of metals in the Catawissa Tunnel are lower than other mine drainage tunnels in the watershed of Catawissa Creek.

The concentration of iron in the water discharged from the Catawissa Tunnel is 1.01 milligrams per liter and the daily load of iron is 6.9 pounds (3.1 kg). The maximum allowable concentration of iron is 0.58 milligrams per liter and the maximum allowable load is 4.0 pounds (1.8 kg). The iron load requires a 43 percent reduction to meet its total maximum daily load requirements. The concentration of manganese is 0.31 milligrams per liter and the load of manganese is 2.1 pounds (0.95 kg) per day. The maximum allowable manganese concentration is 0.31 milligrams per liter and the maximum allowable load is 2.1 pounds (0.95 kg) per day. The load of manganese requires no reduction to meet its total maximum daily load requirements.

The concentration of aluminum in the tunnel's waters is 1.27 milligrams per liter and the daily load is 8.7 pounds (3.9 kg). The maximum allowable concentration is 0.39 milligrams per liter and the maximum allowable daily load is 2.7 pounds (1.2 kg). The aluminum load requires a 69 percent reduction to meet its total maximum daily load requirements. On April 15, 1975, the concentrations of magnesium and calcium were 3.70 and 3.50 milligrams per liter, respectively. The concentration of strontium was measured to be 20 micrograms per liter and the barium is 23 micrograms per liter. The concentrations of lithium, sodium and potassium were 0.10, 50, and 60 micrograms per liter, respectively.

The concentrations of titanium and zirconium in the discharge of the Catawissa Tunnel are both less than 1 microgram per liter. The vanadium concentration is less than 0.5 milligrams per liter, the chromium and molybdenum concentrations are less than 1 milligram per liter. The concentrations of cobalt, nickel, and copper are 40 micrograms per liter, 100 micrograms per liter, and 30 micrograms per liter, respectively. The silver concentration is less than one microgram per liter. The concentrations of zinc and mercury are 200 and 0.5 micrograms per liter, respectively.

The concentrations of gallium, germanium, and tin in the waters of the Catawissa Tunnel is less than 1 microgram per liter. The bismuth concentration is less than 1 microgram per liter and the arsenic concentration is 1 milligram per liter.

A number of other elements have been observed in the discharge of the Catawissa Tunnel, but their concentrations are unknown. These include beryllium, boron, cadmium, and lead.

== Nonmetals ==
On April 15, 1975, the concentration of nitrogen in the form nitrates was measured to be 0.08 milligrams per liter in the waters of the Catawissa Tunnel. The concentration of organic carbon was measured to be 13.0 milligrams per liter. The concentration of hydrogen ions in the tunnel's waters was measured to be 0.12689 milligrams per liter.

The concentration of sulfates in the waters of the Catawissa Tunnel was measured to be 58.0 milligrams per liter on April 15, 1975. The chloride concentration was 1.4 milligrams per liter and the fluoride concentration was 0.1 milligrams per liter. Additionally, the mineral silica is present in the waters of the tunnel. Its concentration was measured to be 8 micrograms per liter.

The concentration of total dissolved solids in the waters of the Catawissa Tunnel was measured to be 0.19 tons per day and 0.12 tons per acre-foot on April 15, 1975.

== Other hydrological information ==
The discharge of the Catawissa Tunnel is 820,000 gallons per day. The discharge of the tunnel ranges from 4,000 to 10,000 gallons per minute, although it can reach 18,000 gallons per minute during rainfall. This is fairly close to the discharges of the other mine drainage tunnels in the watershed of Catawissa Creek.

The pH of the water discharged from the Catawissa Tunnel ranges from 3.8 to 4.5, with an average of 4.17. However, it was measured to be 3.9 on April 15, 1975. The concentration of acidity in the tunnel's water is 18.44 milligrams per liter and the daily load of acidity is 126.1 pounds (57.2 kg). The acidity load requires a 90 percent reduction to meet its total maximum daily load requirements. The concentration of alkalinity is 4.11 milligrams per liter and the daily load of alkalinity is 28.1 pounds (12.7 kg) per day. The concentration of water hardness was measured to be 24.0 milligrams per liter in 1975.

The water temperature of the water discharged from the Catawissa Tunnel was measured to be 7.0 °C (44.6 °F) on April 15, 1975. The specific conductance at this time was 175 micro-siemens per centimeter at 25 °C (77 °F).
