= Quakake Tunnel =

Coordinates: 40.9191°N 75.9018°W

- Interactive map of Quakake Tunnel

Overview
- Other names: Meadow Tunnel, Beaver Meadow Tunnel
- Location: Packer Township, Pennsylvania, U.S.
- Start: Jeansville Coal Basin in Packer Township, Pennsylvania
- End: Wetzel Creek in Packer Township, Pennsylvania

Technical
- Length: approximately 3,900 feet (1,200 m)
- Min elevation: approximately 1,300 feet (400 m)

The Quakake Tunnel (also known as the Meadow Tunnel or the Beaver Meadow Tunnel) is a mine drainage tunnel in Carbon County, Pennsylvania, in the United States. The tunnel is several thousand feet long and has a discharge of thousands of gallons per minute. It was the subject of an Operation Scarlift report. The tunnel is a major contributor of acid mine drainage to the watershed of the Lehigh River.

== Description ==
The Quakake Tunnel is located in Packer Township near the border between Carbon and Luzerne counties. The tunnel is located to the south of the borough of Beaver Meadows. It is approximately 3,900 feet (1,200 m) in length. The mouth of the tunnel is at Wetzel Creek and its waters ultimately enter the Delaware River. The tunnel's direction is mainly north and 60 degrees west and the other end of the tunnel is in coal mine workings belonging to the Lykens Vein. It drains part of the Spring Mountain coal workings as well as the Beaver Meadow and the Coleraine coal workings.

The mouth of the Quakake Tunnel is slightly over 1,300 feet (400 m) above sea level. The upper end of the tunnel is not significantly higher.

The Quakake Tunnel is one of four sources of acid mine drainage in Carbon County and one of eight in the watershed of the Lehigh River.

== Geology ==
The portal of the Quakake Tunnel is in severely fractured red shale. Timbering is required to support the tunnel at this location. Other varieties of rocks are found deeper into the tunnel. Sandstone belonging to the Pottsville Formation is found from 1,450 feet (440 m) above the mouth of the tunnel to 1,800 feet (550 m) above the mouth of the tunnel. From this area up to 2,000 feet (610 m) from the tunnel's mouth, the tunnel is mostly in conglomerate rock. There are few fractures in the rock in this part of the tunnel. From 2,100 to 2,200 feet (640 to 670 m), 3,300 to 3,400 feet (1,000 to 1,000 m), and 3,650 to 3,850 feet (1,110 to 1,170 m), there are more conglomerates. Other rock types found deeper than 2,000 feet (610 m) include red shale, gray shale, and sandstone.

There are coal seams at the upper end of the Quakake Tunnel.

The Quakake Tunnel is collapsed in places. Historically, there was also debris in the tunnel. A number of minor thrust faults are also found within the tunnel. A synclinal axis occurs at 1,900 feet (580 m) from the mouth and an anticlinal axis occurs at 2,800 feet (850 m) from the mouth. The tunnel is at the southeastern edge of the Jeansville Coal Basin.

The water of the Quakake Tunnel comes from surface water that flows through broken strata and abandoned strip pits.

== Hydrology ==
The discharge of the Quakake Tunnel is greater than the acid mine drainage discharges that feed Hazle Creek at Stockton. The load of acidity in the tunnel is also greater than the aforementioned acid mine drainage discharges. The tunnel causes Wetzel Creek to be acidic as far downstream as its mouth. Between 1979 and 1980, the pH of the discharge of the Quakake Tunnel ranged from 3.4 to 4.6, with an average of 3.9. The total concentration of acidity ranged from 66 to 110 milligrams per liter, with an average of 80 milligrams per liter.

Between 1979 and 1980, the concentration of aluminum in the waters of the Quakake Tunnel ranged between 5.5 and 17.0 milligrams per liter and averaged 9.8 milligrams per liter. The calcium concentration ranged from 6.0 to 39.8 milligrams per liter, with an average of 14.1 milligrams per liter. The iron concentration ranged from 0.18 to 0.97 milligrams per liter, with an average of 0.83 milligrams per liter. The concentration of sulfates ranged from 80 to 200 milligrams per liter, with an average of 144 milligrams per liter.

Between 1973 and 1974, the discharge of the Quakake Tunnel ranged from 10.1 to 33.6 cubic feet per second, with an average of 21.3 cubic feet per second. The water temperature ranged from 9 to 10 °C (48 to 50 °F), with an average of 9 °C (48 °F). Between 1979 and 1980, the average water temperature of the tunnel's discharge was 9 °C (48 °F). As of 2008, the discharge of the tunnel is over 6000 gallons per minute (13.37 cubic feet per second), making it the largest abandoned mine discharge in the watershed of the Lehigh River.

== History ==
The Quakake Tunnel was constructed for the purpose of draining water from deep mines via gravity.

A prototype installation of a treatment system for the Quakake Tunnel was constructed in 1978 and 1979.

The Quakake Tunnel was cleared of debris by the Pennsylvania Department of Environmental Protection at some point in the past. After this, it was possible to access the tunnel between its lower end and its upper end for the purposes of mapping it. A study once suggested that it was possible to place a seal in the tunnel between 1,800 and 2,000 feet (550 and 610 m) from its mouth.

The treatment of the Quakake Tunnel ranks third in priority among eight acid mine drainage discharges in the watershed of the Lehigh River.

== See also ==
- Audenried Tunnel coal mining drainage in Luzerne County
- Catawissa Tunnel coal mining drainage in Schuylkill County
- Green Mountain Tunnel coal mining drainage in Schuylkill County
- Jeddo Tunnel coal mining drainage in Luzerne County
- Oneida Number One Tunnel coal mining drainage in Schuylkill County
- Oneida Number Three Tunnel coal mining drainage in Schuylkill County
