= Cross Run =

Coordinates: 40°54′58″N 76°01′27″W

Physical characteristics
- Source
  - location: immediately east of Pismire Ridge in Hazle Township, Luzerne County, Pennsylvania
  - elevation: 1,700 to 1,720 feet (520 to 520 m)
- Mouth
  - location: Catawissa Creek in Hazle Township, Luzerne County, Pennsylvania
  - elevation: 1,630 ft (500 m)
- Length: 1.1 mi (1.8 km)

Basin features
- Progression: Catawissa Creek → Susquehanna River → Chesapeake Bay
- Tributaries
  - left: one unnamed tributary

Cross Run is a tributary of Catawissa Creek in Luzerne County, Pennsylvania, in the United States. It is approximately 1.1 miles (1.8 km) long and flows through Hazle Township. The stream is in the United States Geological Survey quadrangle of Conyngham. The stream has two reservoirs on it and has been used as a water supply for Hazleton since at least the late 1800s or early 1900s. Both of the stream's reservoirs have dams. The stream has one unnamed tributary. Cross Run and its unnamed tributary are considered by the Pennsylvania Department of Environmental Protection to be impaired for part of their lengths.

== Course ==
Cross Run begins immediately east of Pismire Ridge in Hazle Township. The stream flows west-southwest for several hundred feet. It then turns south and after a few hundred feet enters a reservoir. At the southwestern corner of the reservoir, the stream passes through the Upper Mount Pleasant Dam and almost immediately turns southeast, entering a second reservoir after a few hundred feet. At the southeastern corner of this reservoir, it flows south-southwest for several hundred feet before receiving an unnamed tributary and turning west. After several hundred feet, the stream enters a third lake and turns south-southwest. At the southern edge of the lake, the stream loses its flow for a few dozen feet before entering a fourth lake, where it reaches its confluence with Catawissa Creek.

== Hydrology ==
A total of 0.22 miles (0.35 km) of Cross Run is considered by the Pennsylvania Department of Environmental Protection to be impaired for aquatic life by abandoned mine drainage and metals. Its unnamed tributary is also considered to be impaired for the same reason for 1.54 miles (2.48 km).

== Geography and watershed ==
The elevation near the mouth of Cross Run is 1,630 feet (500 m) above sea level. The elevation of the source of the stream is between 1,700 feet (520 m) and 1,720 feet (520 m) above sea level.

There is a ravine in the watershed of Cross Run. A coal basin known as Coal Basin No. 2 has one terminus in the vicinity of the stream. This coal basin is associated with Dreck Creek.

There are two reservoirs on the stream near its headwaters, one upstream of the other. The upper reservoir is 15 feet (4.6 m) deep on average, with a maximum depth of 20 feet (6.1 m). It has an area of approximately eight acres and has a volume of 26,500,000 gallons. The lower reservoir is 15 feet (4.6 m) deep on average, with a maximum depth of 25 feet (7.6 m). It has a volume of 44,000,000 gallons. Both reservoirs are dammed.

Cross Run is in the United States Geological Survey quadrangle of Conyngham. The stream is in the uppermost reaches of the watershed of Catawissa Creek. The stream is 3 miles (4.8 km) southwest of the city of Hazleton.

== History ==
A water supply known as the Mount Pleasant supply existed on Cross Run as early as the early 1900s. The Hazleton Water Company purchased from the Lehigh Valley Coal Company a pair of supply reservoirs on the stream on January 8, 1895. They were part of the Mount Pleasant Plant. The reservoirs were supplied by a deep well. Drilled wells at the headwaters of the stream were historically used as a water supply.

Cross Run was listed in the Geographic Names Information System on January 1, 1990. The stream is also in the Atlas of the Anthracite Coalfields of Pennsylvania.

Cross Run was first listed as impaired in 1996. The total maximum daily load date was 2003.

== See also ==
- Spies Run, next tributary of Catawissa Creek going downstream
- Hunkydory Creek, next tributary of Catawissa Creek going upstream
- List of tributaries of Catawissa Creek
