= Operation Scarlift =

Operation Scarlift (also known as Project 500 or The Bond Issue Program) was a program carried out by the Pennsylvania government in the 1960s and 1970s. Its mission was to repair environmental damage caused by abandoned mine lands, acid mine drainage, and other issues associated with historic mining. The operation began around the time that the Land and Water Conservation and Reclamation Act was passed and became inactive in the 1970s due to a lack of funding. During the operation, a total of $141,000,000 was spent on a variety of tasks, including remedying pollution in hundreds of streams, extinguishing dozens of mine fires, and constructing acid mine drainage treatment plants. Numerous reports on mining-impacted streams were produced during the operation, many of which continue to be used for assessing watersheds.

== Background ==
On May 16, 1967, voters in Pennsylvania approved a $500 million bond issue for the purpose of resolving environmental problems. In 1968, Pennsylvania passed the Land and Water Conservation and Reclamation Act, which was the first act in the United States concerning abandoned mine reclamation. It was this act that led to the formation of Operation Scarlift to repair damage caused by abandoned mines. A chunk of the money from the $500 million bond issue was used to fund the operation.

Operation Scarlift is so-named because of its mission to remove the "scars" left by historical mining activities in Pennsylvania.

== Operations ==
The purpose of Operation Scarlift was to remedy the environmental damage that historic mining in Pennsylvania has caused to the land, water, and air. The operation carried out abandoned mine reclamation projects. These projects addressed such environmental issues as abandoned strip mines, open underground mine shafts, burning refuse banks, mine fires, identifying and gathering data on acid mine drainage sites across Pennsylvania. The operation built a series of lime neutralization stations to remedy acid mine drainage. Additionally, it produced dozens of studies on mining-impacted areas, including watersheds and mine complexes. These reports were created between 1968 and 1982.

The actions taken by Operation Scarlift used a total of $141,000,000. It used the money to carry out 500 stream pollution abatement projects, eliminate 150 areas of mine subsidence, extinguish 75 mine fires, and alleviate air pollution at 30 burning refuse banks. Between 1968 and 1981, approximately $78,000,000 were spent on remedying stream pollution and approximately $64,000,000 was spent on the other tasks carried out by the operation. By 1976, 48 miles (77 km) of streams had been made free of pollution by the operation and another 140 miles (230 km) had had their pollution levels reduced. A total of 32 deep mine complexes were sealed and 2,600 acres (11 km^{2}) were reclaimed.

Operation Scarlift was first administered by the Department of Mines and Mineral Industries. Later, that role passed to the Pennsylvania Department Environmental Resources (now known as the Pennsylvania Department of Environmental Protection). Operation Scarlift became inactive in the 1970s after using up all the money provided by its revenue bond.

=== Stream pollution remedies ===
Operation Scarlift had two main methods for remedying stream pollution by acid mine drainage. These methods were source correction and treatment. Source correction methods in deep mines included deep mine sealing and reducing the flow of surface water into deep mines. The operation also carried out various source correction procedures on strip mines and refuse banks. Where source correction was impractical, treatment was used instead. Treatment sometimes used lime or limestone and was successful at reducing acidity and iron concentrations. However, due to the high cost involved, the operation rarely attempted to treat high sulfate concentrations except when remedying pollution in sources of potable water. Nevertheless, several chemical treatment plants were constructed, and were largely successful. However, several were shut down due to the high cost involved in maintaining them. In the 1980s, some of the remaining funds were used to attempt to construct passive treatment systems such as aerobic and anaerobic wetlands and ponds. However, these systems were mostly ineffective.

== Aftermath ==
While Operation Scarlift was underway, the Pennsylvania Department of Environmental Protection periodically created updates on the status of the operation. These updates were known as Bond Issue Report and the last one was published in 1990. It serves as a historical summary of the operation's work.

Operation Scarlift has been described as achieving "limited success" with acid mine drainage abatement. Despite being several decades old, the information in the reports produced by Operation Scarlift "still provides much valuable background information for groups assessing their watershed", as described by the Abandoned Mine Reclamation Clearinghouse. A number of the reports on mining-impacted watersheds "remain the best descriptions and outlines of the AMD problems in the watersheds". The reports were scanned and digitized in the 2000s.

== See also ==
- Environmental impact of mining
- Quakake Tunnel - subject of an Operation Scarlift report
