= Spies Run =

Coordinates: 40.8974°N 76.0689°W

Physical characteristics
- Source
  - location: mountain in East Union Township, Schuylkill County, Pennsylvania
  - elevation: between 1,660 and 1,680 feet (510 and 510 m)
- Mouth
  - location: Catawissa Creek in East Union Township, Schuylkill County, Pennsylvania
  - elevation: 1,184 ft (361 m)
- Length: 1.0 mi (1.6 km)

Basin features
- Progression: Catawissa Creek → Susquehanna River → Chesapeake Bay
- Tributaries
  - left: one unnamed tributary

Spies Run is a tributary of Catawissa Creek in Schuylkill County, Pennsylvania, in the United States. It is approximately 1.0 mile (1.6 km) long and flows through East Union Township. The stream has a pH that is fairly close to neutral. The stream is in the United States Geological Survey quadrangle of Conyngham. Trout naturally reproduce in it.

== Course ==
Spies Run begins on a mountain in East Union Township, a few hundred feet from the border between East Union Township and Kline Township. It flows northwest in a narrow valley for several tenths of a mile. The stream then receives an unnamed tributary and turns north-northwest, entering a much broader valley. After a few tenths of a mile, it turns northwest and crosses a road. Within several hundred feet, the stream reaches its confluence with Catawissa Creek.

Spies Run arrives at its confluence with Catawissa Creek 36.86 miles (59.32 km) upstream of the mouth of the creek.

== Hydrology ==
Spies Run is described as a "clean stream" in the January 2013 Progress Report for the Eastern Pennsylvania Coalition for Abandoned Mine Reclamation. An extremely low pH was once observed in the stream using two water chemistry units. However, laboratory analysis of water samples for the stream determined that its pH was significantly closer to neutral. The pH measurements observed in the field are considered to erroneous, while the pH measurements observed in the laboratory are considered to be correct.

== Geography ==
The elevation near the mouth of Spies Run is 1,184 feet (361 m) above sea level. The elevation of the stream's source is between 1,660 feet (510 m) and 1,680 feet (510 m).

Spies Run is in the United States Geological Survey quadrangle of Conyngham. The community of McAdoo is near the stream.

There is a mountain in the watershed of Spies Run. A spoon-like geographical feature a mile from Buck Mountain is present at the headwaters of the stream. This geographical feature contains a rock formation known as Formation No. XII.

== History ==
Spies Run was listed in the Geographic Names Information System on January 1, 1990. Additionally, the stream is in the Atlas of the Anthracite Coalfields of Pennsylvania. The stream was considered by the Pennsylvania Fish and Boat Commission for addition to their list of Pennsylvania's wild trout streams in April 2009.

== Biology ==
Wild trout reproduce naturally in Spies Run between its headwaters and its mouth. They have done so as early as 2009.

== See also ==
- Messers Run, next tributary of Catawissa Creek going downstream
- Cross Run, next tributary of Catawissa Creek going upstream
- List of tributaries of Catawissa Creek
