= Jeddo Tunnel =

Coordinates: 41°00′18.6″N 75°59′35.7″W

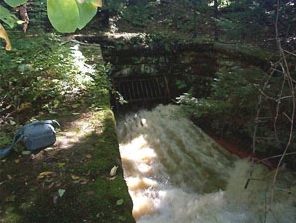
- An outflow of the Jeddo Tunnel

Overview
- Location: Luzerne County, Pennsylvania
- Status: Abandoned
- Start: Black Creek
- End: Butler Valley

Technical
- Length: 5 miles plus (close to 9 counting extensions)

The Jeddo Tunnel (also called the Jeddo Mine Tunnel) is a drainage tunnel at water level in Pennsylvania. It is one of the Coal Region's biggest discharges of mine water. The tunnel is five miles (eight kilometers) long and was constructed between 1891 and 1894, and at the time of its construction, was reputed to be the largest mine drainage tunnel in the world. It consists of major tunnels A and B, and minor tunnels C, D and X.

== Description ==
The Jeddo Tunnel drains four large coal basins over an area of close to 33 square miles (85 km^{2}). It also drained the collieries of G.B. Markle & Company. On average the tunnel drains 40,000 US gallons (150,000 L; 33,000 imp gal) of water each minute. Sometimes the tunnel drains up to 100,000 gallons per minute. The tunnel is about 5 miles (8 kilometers) long and runs between Black Creek and the hills in Butler Valley. It is 7 by 11 feet (2.1 by 3.4 m). The Jeddo Tunnel is located close to the community of Drums. The tunnel drains the nine major minepools in the area via gravity.

The Jeddo Tunnel drains the mines in 13 nearby communities. These communities are Hollywood, Lattimer, Minesville, Drifton, Harleigh, Sandy Run, Ebervale, Humboldt, Cranberry, Harwood, Stockton, and the Eckley Miners' Village.

== Hydrology ==
The level of precipitation in the watershed of the Jeddo Tunnel between 1996 and 1998 was 48.5 inches (1,230 mm) per year. The average level of surface runoff during the same period was 3.46 inches (88 mm). The base runoff was 32.18 inches (817 mm) inches and the evapotranspiration was 12.87 inches (327 mm) inches. The Jeddo Tunnel is the largest carrier of water away from the Jeddo Tunnel watershed. There are several streams on the surface, such as Black Creek, Little Black Creek, Hazle Creek, and Cranberry Creek. Besides minepools, contributors to the flow of the tunnel include precipitation draining through mines, seepage of streams, and water falling through sinkholes and cave-ins.

39% of the Jeddo Tunnel's discharge, or 30.99 cubic feet (0.878 m^{3}) per second, comes from the Black Creek watershed. 26%, or 16.31 cubic feet (0.462 m^{3}) per second comes from the Cranberry Creek watershed. 21%, or 21.01 cubic feet (0.595 m^{3}) per second, comes from the Hazle Creek watershed. 14%, or 11.43 cubic feet (0.324 m^{3}) per second, comes from the Little Black Creek watershed. The tunnel's discharge is lowest in November. The specific conductance of the water in the Jeddo Tunnel is on average around 728 micromhos.

=== Water quality ===
More than 90,000 pounds (41,000 kg) of acid drain from the Jeddo Tunnel into the Susquehanna River (via Little Nescopeck and Nescopeck Creeks) every day. At the end of the 1990s, the sulfate, iron, manganese, and aluminum levels in the Jeddo Tunnel were significantly lower than in previous years. The pH of the tunnel water has also risen significantly.

The pH of the water in the Jeddo Tunnel ranges between approximately 3.6 and 5.0, and averages around 4.3. The tunnel water's pH level is the lowest at the end of summer and the beginning of autumn. The most commonly occurring cation in the water of the tunnel is magnesium, which occurs in concentrations of 52 mg/L. Calcium is another cation that occurs in the tunnel water, at concentrations of 35 mg/L. Sodium and potassium also occur in the water from the Jeddo Tunnel, at concentrations of 12 and 2.2 mg/L, respectively. There are also several other metals in the tunnel's water. The iron concentration ranges from 2 to 90 mg/L and averages at 9 mg/L. The manganese concentration ranges from 1.4 to 6.8 mg/L and averages at 4.2 mg/L. The aluminum concentration ranges from 2.5 to 44 mg/L. The zinc concentration in the tunnel water averages at 0.7 mg/L. The iron, aluminum, and manganese concentrations are all several times higher than the ideal concentration. Common anions in the tunnel's water include sulfate and chloride. These occur at concentrations of 284 and 13.5 mg/L, respectively. The concentration of solids in the water of the Jeddo Tunnel ranges between 265 and 6800 mg/L. The average concentration is 900 mg/L. The solids consist of 125 milligrams per liter of suspended solids and 140 to 6675 mg/L of dissolved solids. The concentration of solids in the water has been decreasing since at least the 1990s.

An average of 2,900 pounds (1,300 kg) of aluminum, 1,350 pounds (610 kg) of manganese, and 860 pounds (390 kg) of iron per day flow through the Jeddo Tunnel.

== History ==
The original builders of the Jeddo Tunnel suspected that the local farmers, who used Little Nescopeck Creek as their water supply, would not approve of mine waters from the tunnel polluting the creek. Because of this, the lawyer Thomas McNair bought the right of way along the creek.

The basic geology of the Jeddo Tunnel's watershed was created 345 million years ago, during the Carboniferous Period. The Jeddo Tunnel itself was established at the end of the 19th century. John Markle was one of the people involved in designing the tunnel; he spent three years and $1,000,000 on the construction of the tunnel. Two teams of workers used compressed air drills and explosives to build the tunnel from both ends. A total of 250 workers were involved in the construction of the tunnel. The construction finished on September 15, 1894. The construction of the Jeddo Tunnel used up 170 tons of forcite, a Belgian gel dynamite. The Jeddo Tunnel's original purpose was to remove the water from deep coal mines in the eastern middle anthracite field. However it also connects to mining operations near Hazleton. The construction of the tunnel involved the channeling of streams, as well as the construction of haulageways. When constructed, the tunnel was considered to be an engineering marvel; however, in modern times, Alan C. Gregory describes it as "a dinosaur that survived extinction". The tunnel ceased to be used in 1955, when the deep-mining industry stopped, and the mines in the area were largely abandoned in 1961. However Pagnotti Enterprises still mines anthracite in the vicinity of the tunnel. The water quality of the Jeddo Tunnel has improved slightly since the deep-mining industry stopped.

The Jeddo Tunnel has been the subject of a number of studies. Between 1949 and 1950, group led by a person named Ash gathered data on the tunnel's water quality and discharge. The Hazleton City Authority conducted a study at the beginning of the 1970s, attempting to determine if the tunnel's outflow was of suitable quality for drinking water. The United States Geological Survey monitored the tunnel's water quality and flow in 1975 and again in 1991. The Wildlife Conservancy, Bloomsburg University, and the Susquehanna River Basin Commission all studied the Jeddo Tunnel between 1995 and 1998. The National Renewable Energy Laboratory once conducted a study to determine whether it would be worthwhile to install a hydroelectric system in the Jeddo Tunnel. Several studies have attempted to fix the pollution coming from the tunnel but their proposed plans cost at least $15,000,000 and take at least 20 years.

=== Construction of additional tunnels ===
The main tunnels of the Jeddo Tunnel A and B were built in 1895. In later years, several more tunnels were added to the system, increasing its length to close to 6 miles (9.7 km). Jeddo Tunnel A goes from Ebervale Mammoth Vain slope number 2 to Little Nescopeck Creek and is 15,100 feet (4,600 m) long. Jeddo Tunnel B goes from Jeddo Mammoth Vain slope number 9 to the beginning of Jeddo Tunnel A, a distance of 9,800 feet (3,000 m) feet. Jeddo Tunnel C was created in 1926. It stretched from the Highland Number 5 mine to the beginning of Jeddo Tunnel B for a distance of 4,268 feet (1,301 m). Jeddo Tunnel D was created in 1929. It stretched from Drifton Number 2 mine to the beginning of Jeddo Tunnel C for a distance of 4,038 feet (1,231 m). The final addition to the Jeddo Tunnel was Jeddo Tunnel X, which was constructed in 1934. It started at the Hazleton Shaft Colliery and was 9,601 feet (2,926 m) long. It joins the main tunnel system at the confluence of Jeddo Tunnels A and B.

== Environmental impact, media impact and controversies ==
The Jeddo Tunnel was initially received positively. The Philadelphia Press and the New York Herald both printed a piece on the tunnel on December 9, 1894, calling the tunnel a "remarkable feat of engineering".

The water that the Jeddo Tunnel drains is polluted due to past mining in its vicinity. The Jeddo Tunnel drains into Little Nescopeck Creek, thus polluting the creek and consequently Nescopeck Creek, the Susquehanna River, and the Chesapeake Bay. The construction of the tunnel has partially contributed to the width of Little Nescopeck Creek increasing from around 10 feet to between 30 and 40 feet. The tunnel is the only source of acid mine drainage that flows into Little Nescopeck Creek. The Jeddo Tunnel has eroded the banks of Little Nescopeck Creek.

One contaminant in the Jeddo Tunnel is aluminum. The tunnel also discharges coal dust and sediment containing heavy metals. These materials collect along the banks of Little Nescopeck Creek. Two people were killed in the Jeddo Tunnel on February 5, 1894. The tunnel also takes in sewage, hydrocarbons, and runoff pollution.

== Reducing tunnel discharge ==
Several proposed measures have been introduced to reduce the discharge of the Jeddo Tunnel. One of these methods is to seal fissures, cave-ins, and sinkholes in the Jeddo Tunnel watershed. This could reduce the Jeddo Tunnel's discharge by 11%. Diverting runoff from the hills around the coal basins near the Jeddo Tunnel is another method of reducing the tunnel's discharge, and this could reduce the discharge by 10%. Creating perimeter drains to pick up runoff from nearby ridges is another proposed method of reducing the tunnel's discharge.

== See also ==
- Audenried Tunnel coal mining drainage in Luzerne County
- Catawissa Tunnel coal mining drainage in Schuylkill County
- Green Mountain Tunnel coal mining drainage in Schuylkill County
- Oneida Number One Tunnel coal mining drainage in Schuylkill County
- Oneida Number Three Tunnel coal mining drainage in Schuylkill County
- Quakake Tunnel coal mining drainage in Carbon County
