= Tomhicken Creek =

Tributary of Catawissa Creek in Pennsylvania, US

Coordinates: 40.9105°N 76.2144°W

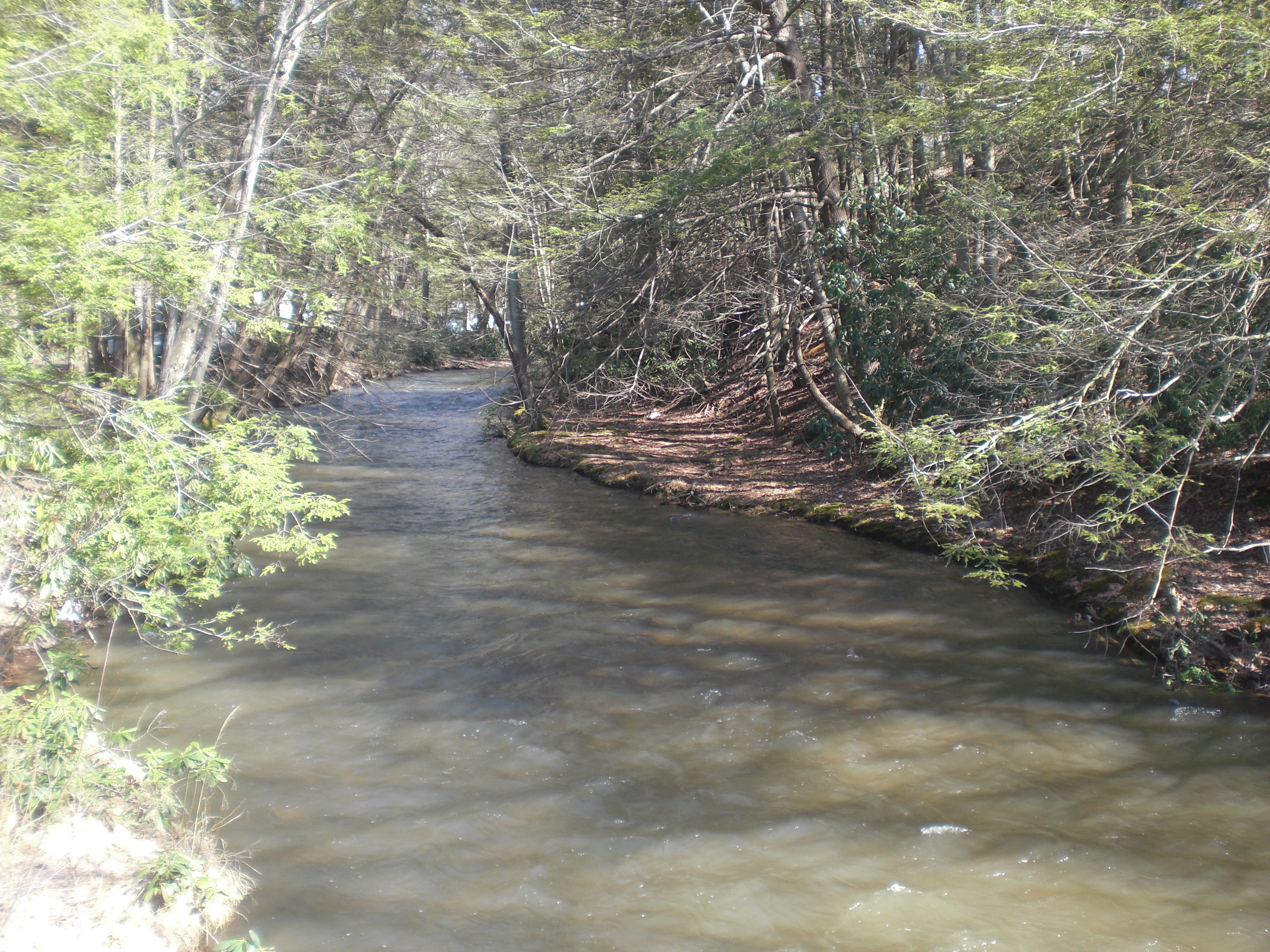
- Tomhicken Creek a little over a mile from its mouth

Physical characteristics
- Source
  - location: Deep mine in Hazle Township, Luzerne County, Pennsylvania, U.S.
- Mouth
  - location: Catawissa Creek in North Union Township, Schuylkill County, Pennsylvania, U.S.
- Length: 11 mi (18 km)
- Basin size: 20.6 sq mi (53 km^{2})
- Discharge
  - average: 10,687.5 US gal/min (0.67428 m^{3}/s)

Basin features
- Tributaries
  - left: Little Tomhicken Creek, Little Crooked Run
  - right: Sugarloaf Creek, Raccoon Creek

Tomhicken Creek, also known as Tomhickon Creek, is a stream in Luzerne County and Schuylkill County, in Pennsylvania, in the United States. It is approximately 11 miles (18 km) long and is the largest tributary of Catawissa Creek. Named tributaries of the creek include Little Crooked Run, Little Tomhicken Creek, Raccoon Creek, and Sugarloaf Creek. The watershed of the main stem has an area of 20.6 square miles. A number of mine tunnels discharge into the creek and its tributaries.

== Course ==
The headwaters of Tomhicken Creek are inside a deep mine. Tomhicken Creek begins in southwestern Hazle Township, Luzerne County immediately west of an area of strip mines and north of Pismire Ridge. It flows west-southwest, roughly paralleling Pennsylvania Route 924 and shortly leaves Hazle Township and Luzerne County. Upon leaving Luzerne County, the creek enters East Union Township, in Schuylkill County.

It crosses Pennsylvania Route 924 and flows immediately north of another area of strip mines before turning northwest to flow off Green Mountain and entering North Union Township. It receives Sugarloaf Creek in the eastern reaches of the township and shortly afterwards passes the community of Miller's Corner. At Miller's Corner, Tomhicken Creek turns southwest and then north, receiving Raccoon Creek. The creek then turns southwest again and meanders several times south of Red Ridge before reaching its confluence with Catawissa Creek near the community of Zion Grove.

=== Tributaries ===
Tomhicken Creek's tributaries include Sugarloaf Creek, Little Tomhicken Creek, and Raccoon Creek.

Raccoon Creek is approximately 3 miles (4.8 km) long and flows west from Black Creek Township, Luzerne County into North Union Township, Schuylkill County, where it joins Tommhicken Creek.

Little Tomhicken Creek is approximately 1 mile (1.6 km) long and flows southwest to join Tomhicken Creek in East Union Township. Sugarloaf Creek is approximately 3.5 miles (5.6 km) long and flows from Hazle Township, Luzerne County to North Union Township, where it joins the main stem.

Other tributaries include Little Crooked Run and "Trib 27568 to Tomhicken Creek".

== Hydrology ==
Little Tomhicken Creek contributes acid mine drainage to Tomhicken Creek. There are also high concentrations of nutrients in the creek.

Upstream of Little Tomhicken Creek, Sugarloaf Creek, and the Oneida No. 3 Tunnel, the iron concentration is 0.5 milligrams per liter. The daily load is 4.8 pounds (2.2 kg). The manganese concentration is 0.08 milligrams per liter, equating to a daily load of 0.8 pounds (0.36 kg). The concentration of aluminum is 0.69 milligrams per liter, so the daily load is 6.7 pounds (3.0 kg). The concentrations of acidity and alkalinity are 0.83 and 23.37 milligrams per liter respectively and the loads are 8.0 pounds (3.6 kg) per day and 226.1 pounds (102.6 kg) per day. The concentration of sulfates ranges from 10 to 65 milligrams per liter with an average of 25.69 milligrams per liter.

At the mouth of Tomhicken Creek, the concentration of iron is 0.15 milligrams per liter. The daily load is 4.8 pounds (2.2 kg). The manganese concentration is 0.17 milligrams per liter, equating to a daily load of 0.8 pounds (0.36 kg). The concentration of aluminum is 0.42 milligrams per liter, so the daily load is 6.7 pounds (3.0 kg). The concentration of acidity is 10.92 milligrams per liter and the concentration of alkalinity is 6.04 milligrams per liter. The daily load of acidity is 1,401.6 pounds (635.8 kg) and the load of alkalinity is 775.2 pounds (351.6 kg). the minimum sulfate concentration is 21 milligrams per liter, the average concentration is 30.04 milligrams per liter, and the maximum concentration is 49 milligrams per liter.

The pH of Tomhicken Creek upstream of Little Tomhicken Creek, Sugarloaf Creek, and the Oneida No. 3 Tunnel ranges from 5.6 to 7.2 with an average of 6.52. At the mouth, the pH ranges from 5.8 to 6.2 with an average of 6.0. Before 1997, much of the lower reaches of the creek had a pH from 4.0 to 4.9.

The discharge of Tomhicken Creek near its headwaters is 10,681 gallons per minute. Near Zion Grove, the discharge is 10,687.5 gallons per minute.

== Geology ==
The Oneida No. 3 Tunnel empties into Tomhicken Creek downstream of the mouth of Little Tomhicken Creek. The Oneida No. 1 Tunnel discharges into the tributary Sugarloaf Creek. Little Sugarloaf Mountain is located between Tomhicken Creek and Little Tomhicken Creek. There is a small and narrow basin of coal in the watershed of Tomhicken Creek.

The Mauch Chunk Formation is found near the confluence of the creek with Catawissa Creek and much of the rest of the Tomhicken Creek watershed. However, some of the upper reaches of the watershed are occupied by the Hamilton Group. The soils in the watershed include the Leck Kill soil in the lower reaches and the Hazleton Soil in the upper reaches.

There are deep valleys north and south of the Tomhicken Creek basin due to erosion.

== Watershed ==
The watershed of Tomhicken Creek has an area of 20.6 square miles. The creek is the largest tributary of Catawissa Creek. The watershed is not far from the headwaters of Black Creek at Little Sugarloaf Mountain. The Tomhicken Creek watershed does not border any other major sub-watersheds of Catawissa Creek.

The Eagle Rock Resort is located in the upper reaches of the Tomhicken Creek. It consists mostly of second homes or retirement homes.

== History and recreation ==
Gristmills and other types of mills were built on the creek some time before 1901. The Red Ridge Road bridge over Tomhicken Creek was built in 1937. A nine-ton weight restriction was placed on it in 2010. A number of large private campgrounds have been established along the creek.

== Biology ==
Tomhicken Creek is a coldwater fishery. Little Tomhicken Creek was studied by the Pennsylvania Fish and Boat Commission in 1997 and found to be completely devoid of fish. This has later been found to inaccurate. Tomhicken Creek was found to be teeming with life such as the Bluntnose minnow, Brook trout, Brown Trout, digger crayfish and multiple species of turtles. The tributary Raccoon Creek is classified as a high-quality coldwater fishery.

There are four species of fish in the upper reaches of Tomhicken Creek and five species of fish between two sites in the lower reaches. A large population of brook trout, as well as several other fish species, inhabit the tributary Raccoon Creek. There is also a significant population of brook trout in the tributary Little Crooked Run.

In 1905, 700 rainbow trout were observed in Tomhicken Creek and Little Tomhicken Creek.

Significant numbers of Allocapnia and Taeniopteryx were observed on Tomhicken Creek near Zion Grove in 2003. Sweltsa have also been observed in the creek.

== See also ==
- Crooked Run (Catawissa Creek), next tributary of Catawissa Creek going downstream
- Little Catawissa Creek, next tributary of Catawissa Creek going upstream
- List of tributaries of Catawissa Creek
