= Blyvooruitzicht mine =

Mine in South Africa

- Location within South Africa
- Location: Gauteng, South Africa; 26°22′59″S 27°22′57″E
- Products: gold and uranium

The Blyvooruitzicht mine is a large mine located near the village of Blyvooruitzicht in the northern part of Gauteng, South Africa. Blyvooruitzicht represents one of the largest gold reserves in South Africa. It is part of the Witwatersrand Basin.
