= Sheppton, Pennsylvania =

Unincorporated community in Pennsylvania, US

Sheppton
- Census-designated place
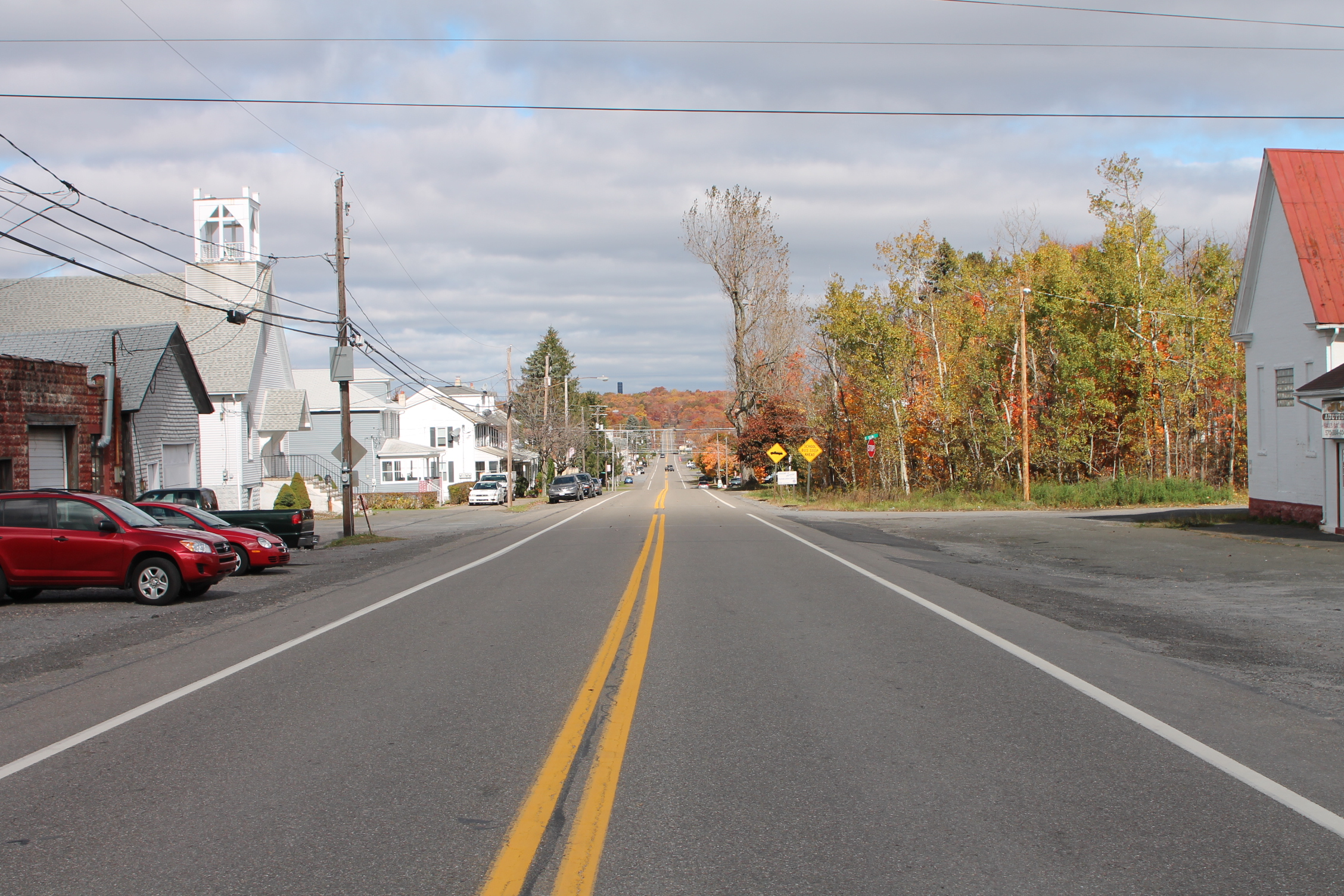
- Pennsylvania Route 924 north in Sheppton

- Location within the U.S. state of Pennsylvania Sheppton (the United States)
- Coordinates: 40°53′46″N 76°7′6″W
- Country: United States
- State: Pennsylvania
- County: Schuylkill
- Township: East Union

Area
  - Total: 0.039 sq mi (0.1 km^{2})
  - Land: 0.039 sq mi (0.1 km^{2})

Population (2000)
  - Total: 239
  - Density: 6,200/sq mi (2,400/km^{2})
- Time zone: UTC-5 (Eastern (EST))
  - Summer (DST): UTC-4 (EDT)
- ZIP codes: 18248
- Area code: 570

Sheppton is a census-designated place (CDP) in Schuylkill County, Pennsylvania, United States. The population was 239 at the 2000 census.

== Geography ==
Sheppton is located at 40°53′46″N 76°7′6″W (40.895990, -76.118221).

According to the United States Census Bureau, the CDP has a total area of 0.1 square miles (0.26 km^{2}), all land.

The ZIP code of Sheppton is 18248.

== Demographics ==
At the 2000 census there were 239 people, 99 households, and 58 families living in the CDP. The population density was 4,492.4 inhabitants per square mile (1,734.5/km^{2}). There were 114 housing units at an average density of 2,142.8 per square mile (827.3/km^{2}). The racial makeup of the CDP was 100.00% White. There were 99 households, 27.3% had children under the age of 18 living with them, 41.4% were married couples living together, 16.2% had a female householder with no husband present, and 41.4% were non-families. 33.3% of households were one person and 21.2% were one person aged 65 or older. The average household size was 2.41 and the average family size was 3.21.

The age distribution was 24.3% under the age of 18, 5.9% from 18 to 24, 27.2% from 25 to 44, 25.1% from 45 to 64, and 17.6% 65 or older. The median age was 40 years. For every 100 females, there were 92.7 males. For every 100 females age 18 and over, there were 84.7 males.

The median household income was $26,042 and the median family income was $35,750. Males had a median income of $30,625 versus $26,250 for females. The per capita income for the CDP was $12,547. About 13.6% of families and 16.3% of the population were below the poverty line, including 15.3% of those under the age of eighteen and 4.8% of those sixty five or over.

== Education ==
The Hazleton Area School District covers the CDP. The zoned public high school is Hazleton Area High School in Hazle Township.
