= List of deepest mines =

This list of deepest mines includes operational and non-operational mines that are at least 2,224 m (7,297 ft), which is the depth of Krubera Cave, the deepest known natural cave in the world. The depth measurements in this list represent the difference in elevation from the entrance of the mine to the deepest excavated point.

The definition of mine for this list is an artificially made excavation for the purpose of extracting resources, that can potentially be accessed by humans.

| Rank | Name of mine | Depth | Location | Primary resource | Active / closed |
|---|---|---|---|---|---|
| 1 | Mponeng Gold Mine | 4.0 km (2.5 mi) | South Africa | Gold | Active |
| 2 | TauTona Mine | 3.9 km (2.4 mi) | South Africa | Gold | Active. Grouped under Mponeng |
| 3 | Savuka Gold Mine | 3.7 km (2.3 mi) | South Africa | Gold | Closed 2017 |
| 4 | East Rand Mine | 3.585 km (2.228 mi) | South Africa | Gold | Closed 2008 |
| 5 | Driefontein Mine | 3.420 km (2.125 mi) | South Africa | Gold | Active |
| 6 | Kusasalethu mine | 3.388 km (2.105 mi) | South Africa | Gold | Active |
| 7 | Empire Mine | 3.355 km (2.085 mi) | United States | Gold | Closed 1956 |
| 8 | Kloof mine | 3.347 km (2.080 mi) | South Africa | Gold, uranium | Active |
| 9 | Laronde Mine | 3.260 km (2.026 mi) | Canada | Gold, copper, silver, zinc | Active |
| 10 | Kolar Gold Fields | 3.217 km (1.999 mi) | India | Gold | Closed 2001 |
| 11 | Blyvooruitzicht mine | 3.213 km (1.996 mi) | South Africa | Gold, uranium | Active |
| 12 | Moab Khotsong mine | 3.052 km (1.896 mi) | South Africa | Gold, uranium | Active |
| 13 | Kidd Mine | 3.014 km (1.873 mi) | Canada | Copper, zinc | Active |
| 14 | Morro Velho | 3.0 km (1.9 mi) | Brazil | Gold | Active |
| 15 | South Deep mine | 2.99 km (1.86 mi) | South Africa | Gold | Active |
| 16 | Target 1 Mine | 2.945 km (1.830 mi) | South Africa | Gold | Active |
| 17 | Lucky Friday Mine | 2.922 km (1.816 mi) | United States | Silver, lead, zinc | Active |
| 18 | Homestake Mine | 2.438 km (1.515 mi) | United States | Gold | Closed 2002 |
| 19 | Phakisa Mine | 2.426 km (1.507 mi) | South Africa | Gold | Active |
| 20 | Great Noligwa Gold Mine | 2.4 km (1.5 mi) | South Africa | Gold | Closed |
| 21 | Creighton Mine | 2.39 km (1.49 mi) | Canada | Nickel | Active |
| 22 | Bambanani Mine | 2.365 km (1.470 mi) | South Africa | Gold | Closed 2020 |
| 23 | Tshepong Mine | 2.349 km (1.460 mi) | South Africa | Gold, uranium | Active |
| 24 | Kopanang mine | 2.334 km (1.450 mi) | South Africa | Gold, uranium | Active |

== See also ==
- List of deepest caves
- List of longest tunnels
- List of largest mining companies by revenue
- List of mines
- List of mines in South Africa
- List of mining companies
- Extreme points of Earth
