= Passive treatment system =

A passive treatment system is a method for removing metals from acid mine drainage. There are several types of passive treatment systems, each of which may be used on their own or in combination to treat effluents. The type of system selected is dependent upon the chemistry of the acid mine drainage and the flow of the discharge, as well as relevant regulations. Passive treatment systems do not require power and are less expensive than active treatment systems. They also require less maintenance, which is an advantage in remote locations.

== Types of passive treatment systems ==
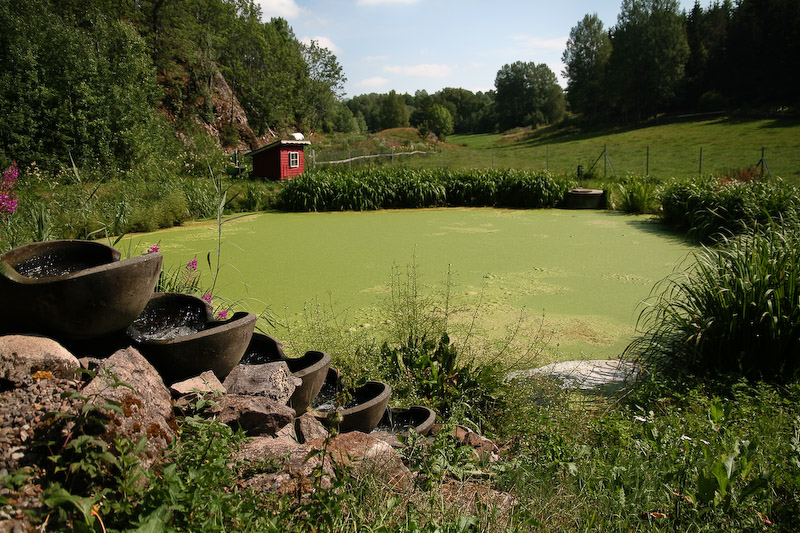
A hybrid system using Flowforms in a passive treatment pond, in Norway.

There are many types of water treatment systems available for removing metals from acid mine drainage. Passive treatment systems are a relatively recent technology that involves using sulfate-reducing bacteria or limestone or both to neutralize acidity and precipitate metals. These systems are sometimes called “wetlands” or “bioreactors.” Passive treatment systems differ from active systems (water treatment plants), which commonly use power; use more hazardous chemicals such as hydrated lime, caustic soda, or ammonia; and, are more expensive. Passive treatment systems are preferred for sites managed by the Bureau of Land Management (BLM).

Passive treatment systems provide a controlled environment in which natural chemical and biological reactions that help in the treatment of acid mine drainage can occur. There are several types of passive treatment systems. Each type may be used on its own, or more than one may be used in sequence to optimize treatment of difficult effluents. However, the design selected will ultimately depend upon site characteristics and other specific criteria.

=== Aerobic wetlands ===
Aerobic wetlands are shallow (1–3 foot deep) ponds; they may be lined or unlined and some are nearly filled with soil or limestone gravel. Such wetlands facilitate natural oxidation of the metals and precipitate iron, manganese, and other metals. Anaerobic wetlands are used to neutralize acidity and reduce metals to the sulfide form. This reaction consumes H+ and therefore acidity.

=== Anaerobic wetlands ===
Anaerobic wetlands may be lined or unlined shallow ponds filled with organic matter, such as compost, and underlain by limestone gravel. Water percolates through the compost, becomes anaerobic and metals precipitate as sulfides. Microorganisms facilitate this reaction by first consuming oxygen. Alkalinity and H_{2}S are produced. If the system is improperly sized, if flow dries up, or if extended low temperatures are encountered, the microorganisms will die and the performance will be decreased. Some anaerobic wetlands discharge a sulfide “sewage” effluent, particularly during the first few years.

=== Anoxic limestone drains ===
Anoxic limestone drains consist of a buried limestone gravel system that requires the exclusion of oxygen and aluminum in the water. If oxygen or aluminum are present, iron and aluminum hydroxides clog the system, causing failure. Alkalinity producing systems are a combination of an anaerobic wetland and an anoxic limestone drain.

=== Other types ===
Other types of passive treatment systems include various limestone treatment configurations, ranging from limestone ponds to open limestone channels in which water flows down a steep slope with limestone riprap. These systems oxidize and precipitate metals and add alkalinity to the water.

Another passive treatment system uses lime dispensing technology to neutralize acidity and precipitate metals in a settling pond. These units do not require power or hazardous chemicals and are inexpensive. BLM is currently conducting pilot tests on the Aquafix technology.

== Advantages ==
Passive treatment systems are a valuable option for treating acid mine drainage at remote locations. The advantages of passive treatment systems are that they do not require electrical power; do not require any mechanical equipment, hazardous chemicals, or buildings; do not require daily operation and maintenance; are more natural and aesthetic in their appearance and may support plants and wildlife; and, are less expensive than active alternatives.

== Disadvantages ==
There are disadvantages with any water treatment system. The disadvantages of passive treatment systems are that they may require complex discharge permits unless taking a Comprehensive Environmental Response, Compensation, and Liability Act (CERCLA) action; may not meet stringent water-quality-based effluent standards; may fail because of poor design or severe winter conditions; and, are a relatively new technology and an area of active research. For these reasons, there have been failures along with success stories.

== Maintenance ==
All of the passive treatment systems described will accumulate metal precipitates and will eventually have to be replaced. Research indicates that these systems can be expected to perform for 20 years. The precipitate is not normally a hazardous waste. Nonetheless, regular monitoring, inspection, and maintenance are required, although to a much lesser extent than with active water treatment systems.

== See also ==
- Constructed wetland
