= North Union Township, Schuylkill County, Pennsylvania =

Township in Pennsylvania, US

Coordinates: 40°54′00″N 76°15′29″W

- Township
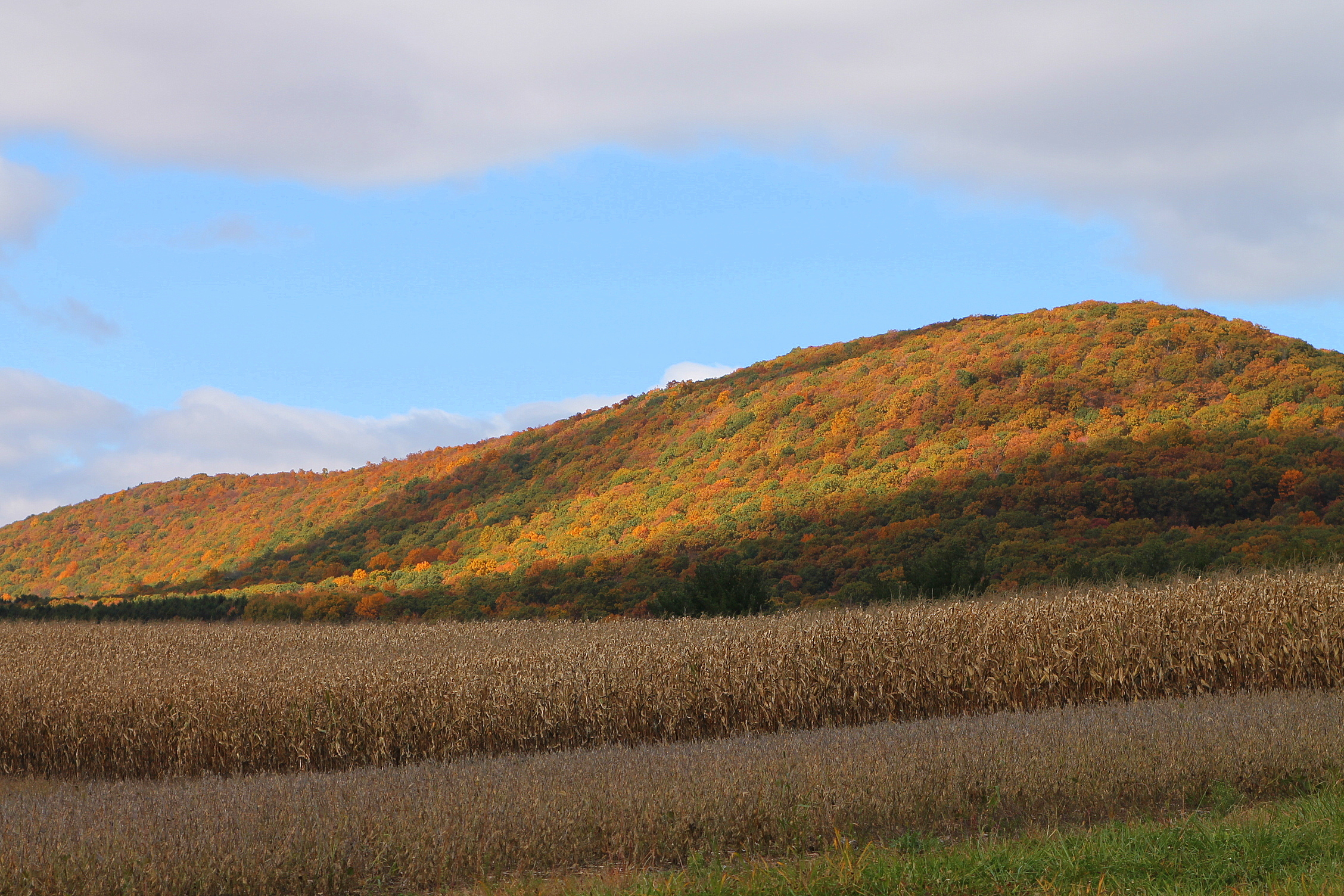
- Buck Mountain in North Union Township

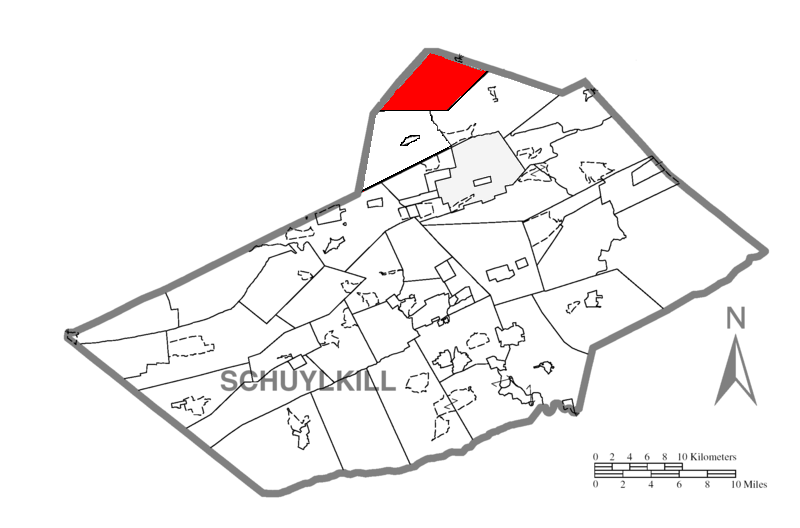
- Map of Schuylkill County, Pennsylvania Highlighting North Union Township

- Map of Schuylkill County, Pennsylvania
- Country: United States
- State: Pennsylvania
- County: Schuylkill
- Settled: 1806
- Incorporated: 1867

Area
  - Total: 20.76 sq mi (53.77 km^{2})
  - Land: 20.72 sq mi (53.67 km^{2})
  - Water: 0.039 sq mi (0.10 km^{2})

Population (2020)
  - Total: 1,409 ▼
  - Estimate (2023): 1,417
  - Density: 68.9/sq mi (26.61/km^{2})
- Time zone: UTC-5 (Eastern (EST))
  - Summer (DST): UTC-4 (EDT)
- FIPS code: 42-107-55472

North Union Township is a township that is located in Schuylkill County, Pennsylvania, United States. The population was 1,409 at the time of the 2020 census.

== Geography ==
According to the United States Census Bureau, the township has a total area of 20.0 square miles (51.9 km^{2}), of which 20.0 square miles (51.8 km^{2}) is land and 0.04 square mile (0.1 km^{2}) (0.20%) is water. It contains part of the census-designated place of Nuremberg.

== Demographics ==
Historical population
Census	Pop.	Note	%±
2010	1,476		—
2020	1,409		−4.5%
2023 (est.)	1,417		0.6%
U.S. Decennial Census

At the time of the 2000 census, there were 1,225 people, 504 households, and 337 families living in the township.

The population density was 61.2 inhabitants per square mile (23.6/km^{2}). There were 598 housing units at an average density of 29.9 per square mile (11.5/km^{2}).

The racial makeup of the township was 97.96% White, 0.57% Asian, 0.73% from other races, and 0.73% from two or more races. Hispanic or Latino of any race were 0.49%.

Of the 504 households that were documented, 27.4% had children who were under the age of eighteen, 55.8% were married couples living together, 7.5% had a female householder with no husband present, and 33.1% were non-families. 28.4% of households were one-person households and 15.9% were one-person households with residents who were aged sixty-five or older.

The average household size was 2.43 and the average family size was 3.00.

The age distribution was 21.0% under the age of eighteen, 6.8% who were aged eighteen to twenty-four, 28.6% who were aged twenty-five to forty-four, 26.9% who were aged forty-five to sixty-four, and 16.8% who were aged sixty-five or older. The median age was forty-one years.

For every one hundred females, there were 100.2 males. For every one hundred females who were aged eighteen or older, there were 100.0 males.

The median household income was $34,659 and the median family income was $42,262. Males had a median income of $31,506 compared with that of $22,188 for females.

The per capita income for the township was $17,108.

Approximately 6.8% of families and 9.1% of the population were living below the poverty line, including 15.6% of those who were under the age of eighteen and 6.5% of those who were aged sixty-five or older.

== Gallery ==
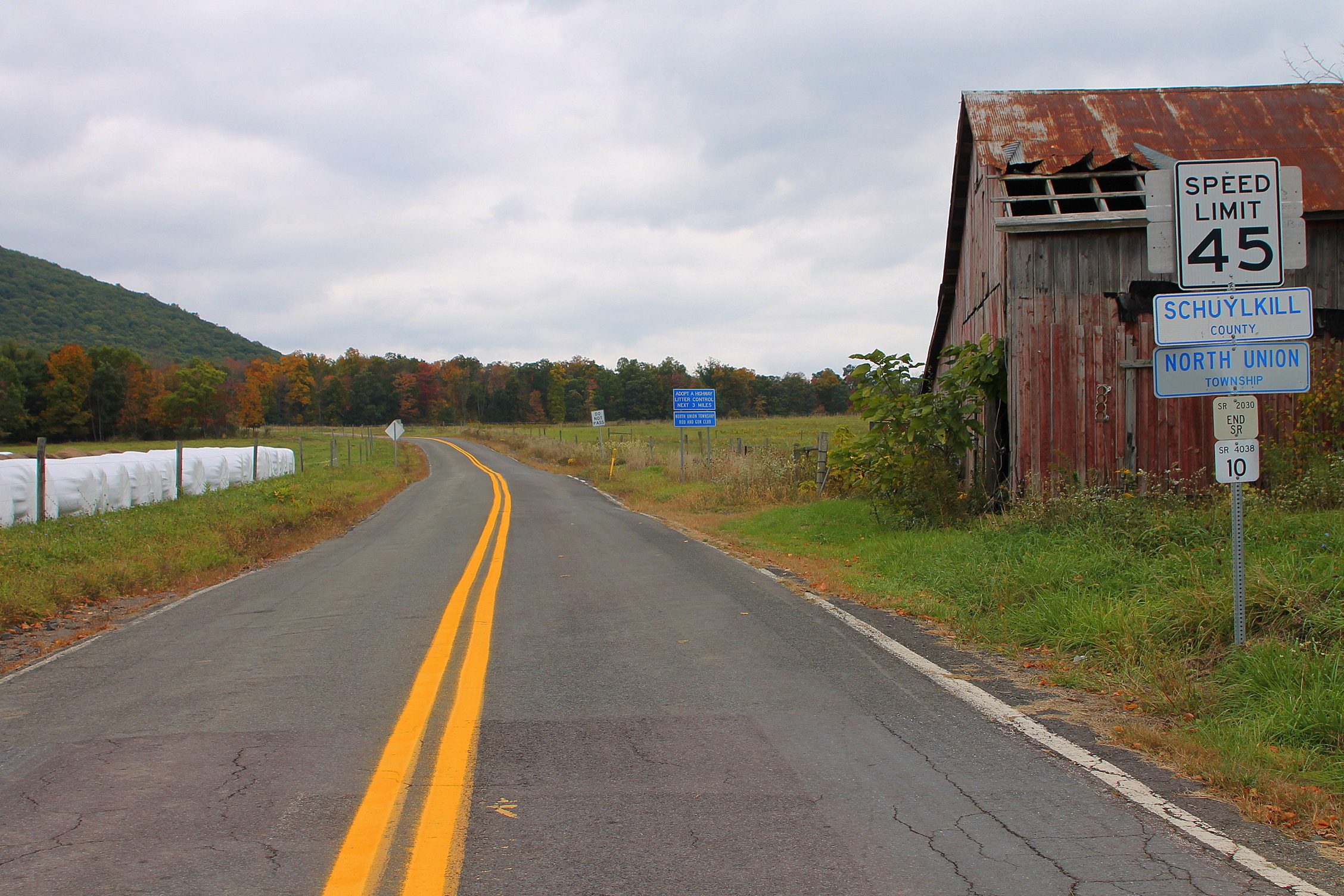
Buck Mountain Road at the Columbia/Schuylkill County line

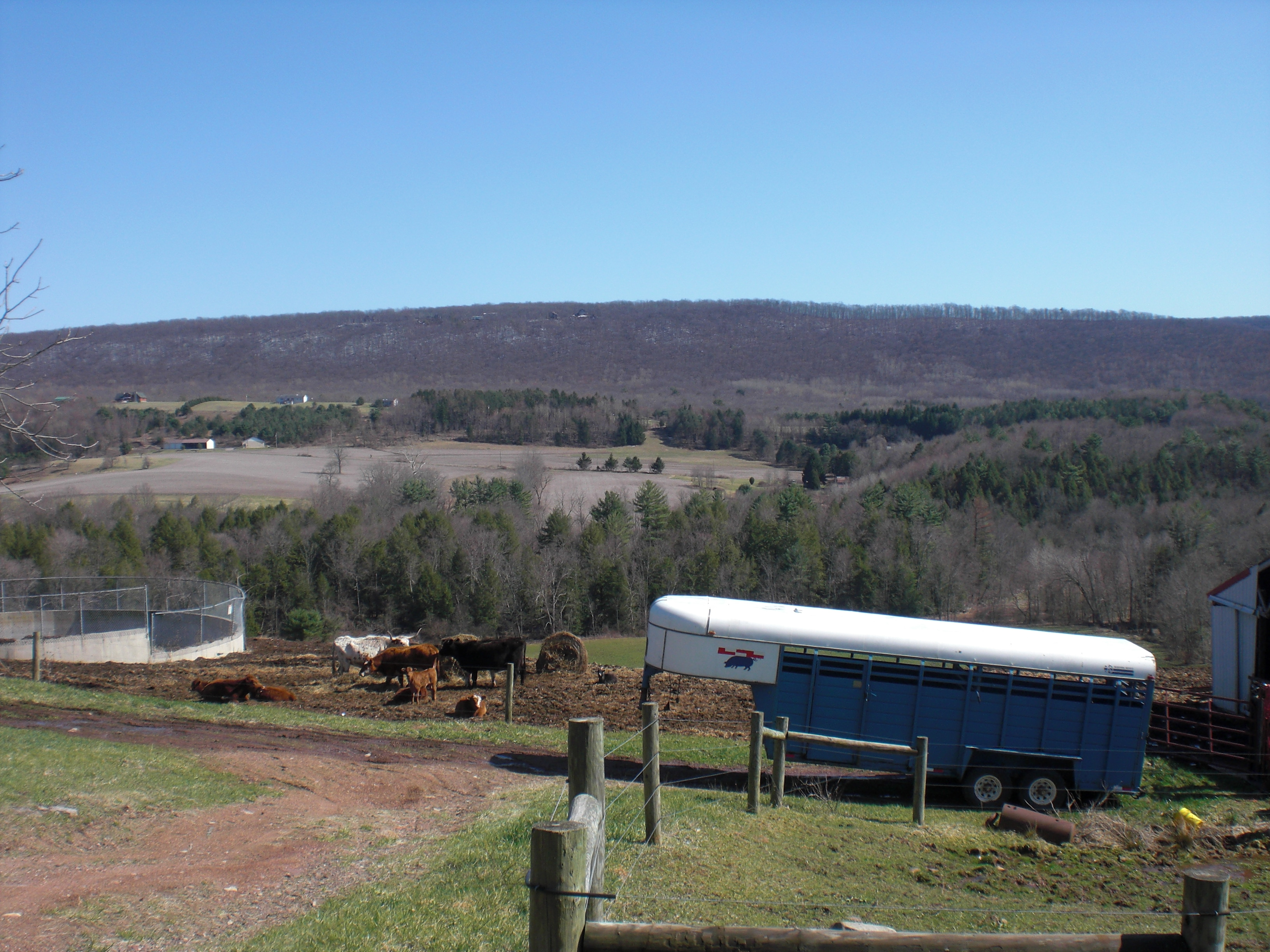
Scenery of North Union Township
