= Total maximum daily load =

Term in US environmental law

A total maximum daily load (TMDL) is a regulatory term in the U.S. Clean Water Act, describing a plan for restoring impaired waters that identifies the maximum amount of a pollutant that a body of water can receive while still meeting water quality standards.

== State and federal agency responsibilities ==
The Clean Water Act requires that state environmental agencies complete TMDLs for impaired waters and that the United States Environmental Protection Agency (EPA) review and approve / disapprove those TMDLs. Because both state and federal governments are involved in completing TMDLs, the TMDL program is an example of cooperative federalism. If a state doesn't take action to develop TMDLs, or if EPA disapproves state-developed TMDLs, the EPA is responsible for issuing TMDLs. EPA published regulations in 1992 establishing TMDL procedures. Application of TMDLs has broadened significantly in the last decade to include many watershed-scale efforts, including the Chesapeake Bay TMDL. TMDLs identify all point source and nonpoint source pollutants within a watershed.

== State inventories ==
The Clean Water Act requires states to compile lists of water bodies that do not fully support beneficial uses such as aquatic life, fisheries, drinking water, recreation, industry, or agriculture; and to prioritize those water bodies for TMDL development. These inventories are known as "303(d) lists" and characterize waters as fully supporting, impaired, or in some cases threatened for beneficial uses.

== Planning process ==
Beneficial use determinations must have sufficient credible water quality data for TMDL planning.

Throughout the U.S., data are often lacking adequate spatial or temporal coverage to reliably establish the sources and magnitude of water quality degradation.

TMDL planning in large watersheds is a process that typically involves the following steps:

1. Watershed characterization—understanding the basic physical, environmental, and human elements of the watershed.
2. Impairment status—analyzing existing data to determine if waters fully support beneficial uses
3. Data gaps and monitoring report—identification of any additional data needs and monitoring recommendations
4. Source assessment—identification of sources of pollutants, and magnitude of sources.
5. Load allocation—determination of natural pollutant load, and load from human activities (i.e. diffuse nonpoint sources and point discharges).
6. Set targets—establishment of water quality targets intended to restore or maintain beneficial uses.
7. TMDL implementation plan—a watershed management strategy to attain established targets.

=== Water quality targets ===
The purpose of water quality targets is to protect or restore beneficial uses and protect human health. These targets may include state/federal numerical water quality standards or narrative standards, i.e. within the range of "natural" conditions. Establishing targets to restore beneficial uses is challenging and sometimes controversial. For example, the restoration of a fishery may require reducing temperatures, nutrients, sediments, and improving habitat.

Necessary values for each pollutant target to restore fisheries can be uncertain. The potential for a water body to support a fishery even in a pristine state can be uncertain.

=== Background ===
Calculating the TMDL for any given body of water involves the combination of factors that contribute to the problem of nutrient concentrated runoff. Bodies of water are tested for contaminants based on their intended use. Each body of water is tested similarly but designated with a different TMDL. Drinking water reservoirs are designated differently from areas for public swimming and water bodies intended for fishing are designated differently from water located in wildlife conservation areas. The size of the water body also is taken into consideration when TMDL calculating is undertaken. The larger the body of water, the greater the amounts of contaminants can be present and still maintain a margin of safety. The margin of safety (MOS) is numeric estimate included in the TMDL calculation, sometimes 10% of the TMDL, intended to allow a safety buffer between the calculated TMDL and the actual load that will allow the water body to meet its beneficial use (since the natural world is complex and several variables may alter future conditions). TMDL is the end product of all point and non-point source pollutants of a single contaminant. Pollutants that originate from a point source are given allowable levels of contaminants to be discharged; this is the waste load allocation (WLA). Nonpoint source pollutants are also calculated into the TMDL equation with load allocation (LA).

=== Calculation ===
The calculation of a TMDL is as follows:

$$TMDL = WLA + LA + MOS$$

where WLA is the waste load allocation for point sources, LA is the load allocation for nonpoint sources, and MOS is the margin of safety.

=== Load allocations ===
Load allocations are equally challenging as setting targets. Load allocations provide a framework for determining the relative share of natural sources and human sources of pollution.

The natural background load for a pollutant may be imprecisely understood. Industrial dischargers, farmers, land developers, municipalities, natural resource agencies, and other watershed stakeholders each have a vested interest in the outcome.

== Implementation ==
To implement TMDLs with point sources, wasteload allocations are incorporated into discharge permits for these sources. The permits are issued by EPA or delegated state agencies under the National Pollutant Discharge Elimination System (NPDES). Nonpoint source discharges (e.g. agriculture) are generally in a voluntary compliance scenario. The TMDL implementation plan is intended to help bridge this divide and ensure that watershed beneficial uses are restored and maintained. Local watershed groups play a critical role in educating stakeholders, generating funding, and implementing projects to reduce nonpoint sources of pollution.

== See also ==
- Wastewater quality indicators
- Water pollution
- Water quality modelling
