= East Union Township, Pennsylvania =

Township in Pennsylvania, US

Coordinates: 40°53′00″N 76°07′59″W

- Township
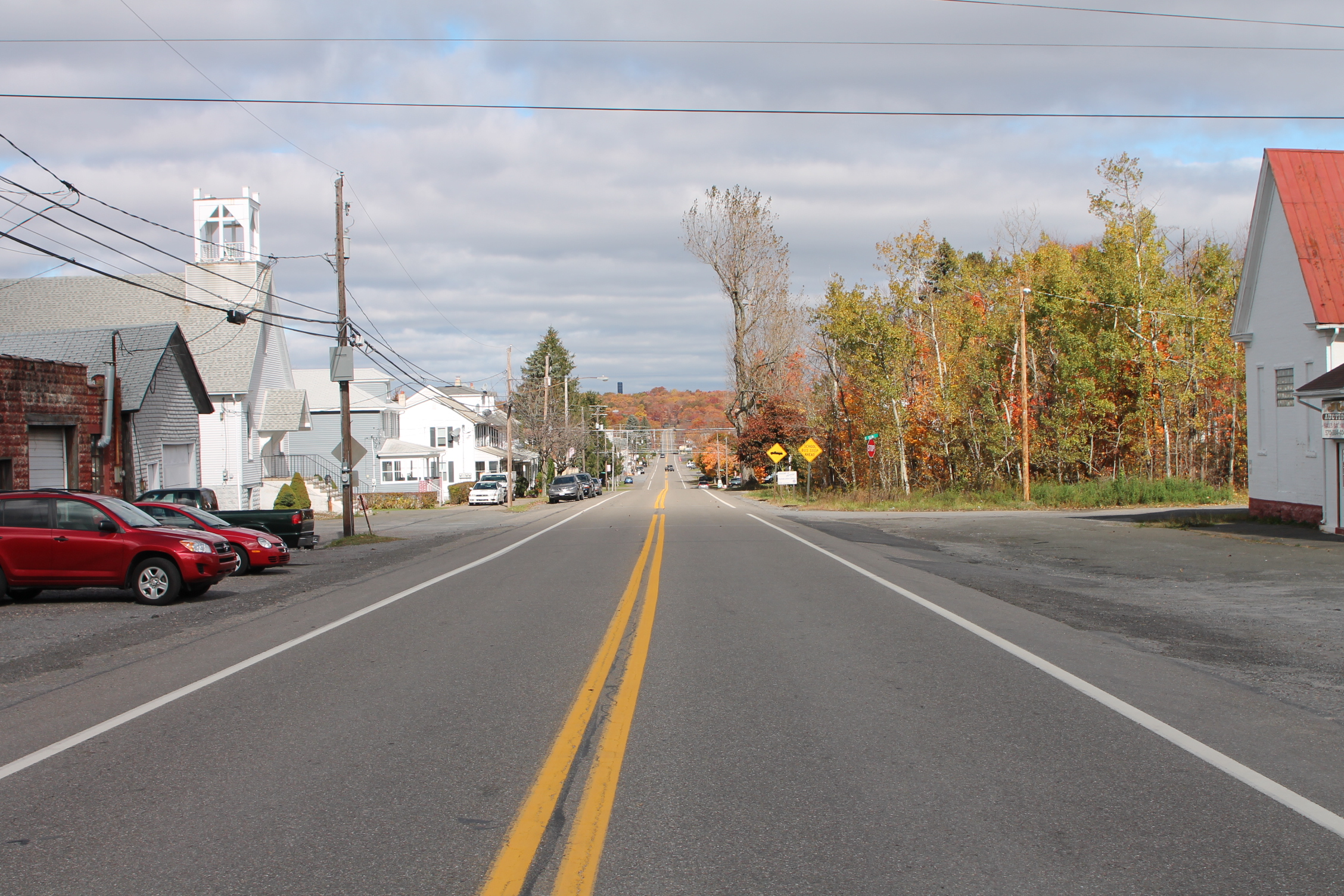
- Pennsylvania Route 924 in Sheppton

- Seal

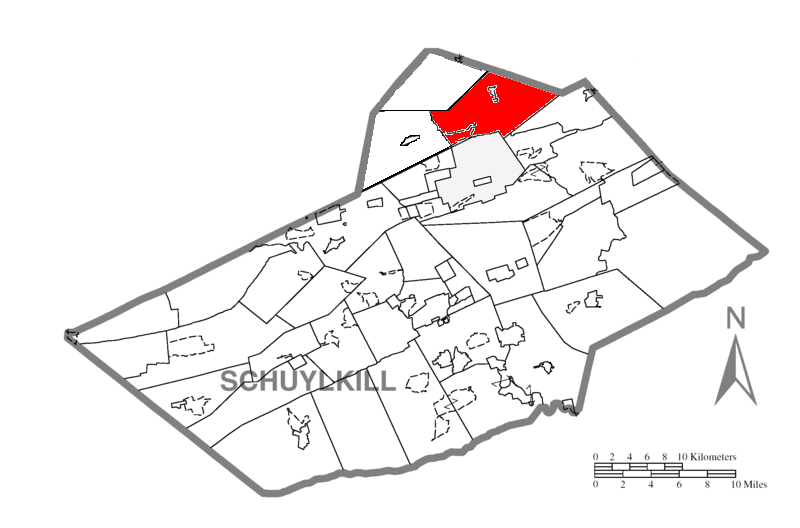
- Map of Schuylkill County, Pennsylvania Highlighting East Union Township

- Map of Schuylkill County, Pennsylvania
- Country: United States
- State: Pennsylvania
- County: Schuylkill
- Settled: 1802
- Incorporated: 1867

Area
  - Total: 25.82 sq mi (66.87 km^{2})
  - Land: 25.79 sq mi (66.79 km^{2})
  - Water: 0.031 sq mi (0.08 km^{2})

Population (2020)
  - Total: 1,641 ▲
  - Estimate (2023): 1,681
  - Density: 61.8/sq mi (23.88/km^{2})
- Time zone: UTC-5 (Eastern (EST))
  - Summer (DST): UTC-4 (EDT)
- FIPS code: 42-107-21952
- Website: www.eastuniontownship.com

East Union Township is a township in Schuylkill County, Pennsylvania, United States. The population was 1,641 at the 2020 census.

== Geography ==
According to the United States Census Bureau, the township has covered total area of 26.0 square miles (67 km^{2}), of which 26.0 square miles (67 km^{2}) is land and 0.04 square miles (0.10 km^{2}) (0.12%) is water. It contains the census-designated place of Brandonville, Oneida, and Sheppton.

== Demographics ==
Historical population
Census	Pop.	Note	%±
2010	1,605		—
2020	1,641		2.2%
2023 (est.)	1,681		2.4%
U.S. Decennial Census

At the 2000 census there were 1,419 people, 630 households, and 400 families living in the township. The population density was 54.6 inhabitants per square mile (21.1/km^{2}). There were 731 housing units at an average density of 28.1 per square mile (10.8/km^{2}). The racial makeup of the township was 99.22% White, 0.14% Native American, 0.07% Asian, 0.35% from other races, and 0.21% from two or more races. Hispanic or Latino of any race were 0.92%.

Of the 630 households 22.7% had children under the age of 18 living with them, 47.1% were married couples living together, 11.0% had a female householder with no husband present, and 36.5% were non-families. 32.1% of households were one person and 15.6% were one person aged 65 or older. The average household size was 2.25 and the average family size was 2.84.

The age distribution was 18.9% under the age of 18, 5.6% from 18 to 24, 27.9% from 25 to 44, 28.2% from 45 to 64, and 19.5% 65 or older. The median age was 44 years. For every 100 females there were 99.0 males. For every 100 females age 18 and over, there were 95.4 males.

The median household income was $31,576 and the median family income was $39,063. Males had a median income of $30,450 versus $21,212 for females. The per capita income for the township was $18,104. About 4.0% of families and 6.3% of the population were below the poverty line, including 5.8% of those under age 18 and 6.8% of those age 65 or over.
