= Laurel Run =

Laurel Run may refer to the following places in the United States

== Communities ==
- Laurel Run Park, in Church Hill, Tennessee
- Laurel Run, Maryland, in St. Mary's County
- Laurel Run, Pennsylvania, in Luzerne County
- Laurel Run, West Virginia, in Preston County

== Streams ==
- Laurel Run (Bald Eagle Creek) (4 streams by this name are tributaries of Bald Eagle Creek)
- Laurel Run (Bennett Branch Sinnemahoning Creek)
- Laurel Run (Clearfield Creek) (2 streams by this name are tributaries of Clearfield Creek)
- Laurel Run (Conemaugh River)
- Laurel Run (Conewago Creek)
- Laurel Run (East Branch Millstone Creek)
- Laurel Run (Elk Creek)
- Laurel Run (Georges Creek)
- Laurel Run (Huntington Creek)
- Laurel Run (Jacobs Creek tributary), a stream in Westmoreland County, Pennsylvania
- Laurel Run (Lackawanna River)
- Laurel Run (Little Brush Creek)
- Laurel Run (Little Conemaugh River)
- Laurel Run (Little Muncy Creek)
- Laurel Run (Marsh Creek)
- Laurel Run (Middle Branch Brodhead Creek)
- Laurel Run (Mill Creek)
- Laurel Run (Moshannon Creek) (2 streams by this name are tributaries of Moshannon Creek)
- Laurel Run (Mud Run)
- Laurel Run (Muddy Run)
- Laurel Run (Muncy Run)
- Laurel Run (Penns Creek)
- Laurel Run (Phoenix Run)
- Laurel Run (Powdermill Run)
- Laurel Run (Roaring Run)
- Laurel Run (Schuylkill River)
- Laurel Run (Sherman Creek)
- Laurel Run (South Fork Little Conemaugh River)
- Laurel Run (Susquehanna River)
- Laurel Run (Toby Creek)
- Laurel Run (West Branch Fishing Creek)
- Laurel Run (West Branch Susquehanna River) (2 streams by this name are tributaries of the West Branch Susquehanna River)
