= Gardner Creek =

Gardner Creek may refer to:

- Gardner Creek (Mill Creek tributary), in Luzerne County, Pennsylvania, US
- Gardner Creek, New Brunswick, New Brunswick, Canada
- Gardner Creek (Susquehanna River tributary), in Lackawanna County, Pennsylvania, US

== See also ==
- Gairdners Creek, New South Wales, Australia
- Gardiners Creek, Melbourne, Victoria, Australia
