= Spring Run =

Spring Run may refer to:

- Spring Run, Pennsylvania, an unincorporated community in Franklin County, Pennsylvania
- Spring Run (Solomon Creek), a stream in Luzerne County, Pennsylvania
- Spring Run (West Branch Susquehanna River), a stream in Northumberland County, Pennsylvania
