= Lampblack Creek =

Lampblack Creek Lamp Black Creek

Physical characteristics
- Source
  - location: small valley on a hill in Jenkins Township, Luzerne County, Pennsylvania
  - elevation: between 1,220 and 1,240 feet (370 and 380 m)
- Mouth
  - location: Gardner Creek in Jenkins Township, Luzerne County, Pennsylvania
  - coordinates: 41°16′51″N 75°46′30″W
  - elevation: 935 ft (285 m)
- Length: 1.5 mi (2.4 km)
- Basin size: 1.08 mi^{2} (2.8 km^{2})

Basin features
- Progression: Gardner Creek → Mill Creek → Susquehanna River → Chesapeake Bay

Lampblack Creek (also known as Lamp Black Creek) is a tributary of Gardner Creek in Luzerne County, Pennsylvania, in the United States. It is approximately 1.5 miles (2.4 km) long and flows through Jenkins Township. The watershed of the creek has an area of 1.08 square miles (2.8 km^{2}). The surficial geology in the area mainly consists of bedrock consisting of sandstone and shale, shale and sandstone pits, urban land, alluvium, Wisconsinan Till, and coal dumps.

== Course ==
Lampblack Creek begins in a small valley on a hill in Jenkins Township. It flows west-southwest for several tenths of a mile before turning west-northwest for a short distance, crossing Interstate 476. The creek then turns southwest for several before turning northwest. Several hundred feet further downstream, it reaches its confluence with Gardner Creek.

Lampblack Creek joins Gardner Creek 3.92 miles (6.31 km) upstream of its mouth.

== Hydrology, geography and geology ==
The elevation near the mouth of Lampblack Creek is 935 feet (285 m) above sea level. The elevation of the creek's source is between 1,220 and 1,240 feet (370 and 380 m) above sea level.

The surficial geology of Lampblack Creek mainly features bedrock consisting of sandstone and shale, as well as shale and sandstone pits. There are also some patches of urban land, alluvium, a glacial or resedimented till known as Wisconsinan Till, and coal dumps.

In 1974, Lampblack Creek was described as having "depressed" water quality. It was affected by acid mine drainage and sedimentation. As of 2009, Pennsy Supply, Inc. has a permit to discharge treated mine discharge into Lampblack Creek.

== Watershed ==
The watershed of Lampblack Creek has an area of 1.08 square miles (2.8 km^{2}). The creek is entirely within the United States Geological Survey quadrangle of Pittston.

The Laflin Reservoir was historically on Gardner Creek just upstream of Lampblack Creek. Lampblack Creek historically had a dam on it and a ditch also ran from the creek to Gardner Creek at a point above the Laflin Reservoir.

Lampblack Creek is a minor sub-tributary of Mill Creek.

== History ==
Lampblack Creek was entered into the Geographic Names Information System on August 2, 1979. Its identifier in the Geographic Names Information System is 1178836. The creek is also known as Lamp Black Creek. This name appears in the Atlas of the Anthracite Coalfields of Pennsylvania, which was published in 1888.

In the 2000s, a 70.9-acre area in the watersheds of Lampblack Creek and Mill Creek in Jenkins Township experienced a $1.27 million mine reclamation project.

== Biology ==
Lampblack Creek is designated as a Coldwater Fishery and a Migratory Fishery.

== See also ==
- List of rivers of Pennsylvania
