= Solomon Creek =

River of the Susquehanna River, Pennsylvania

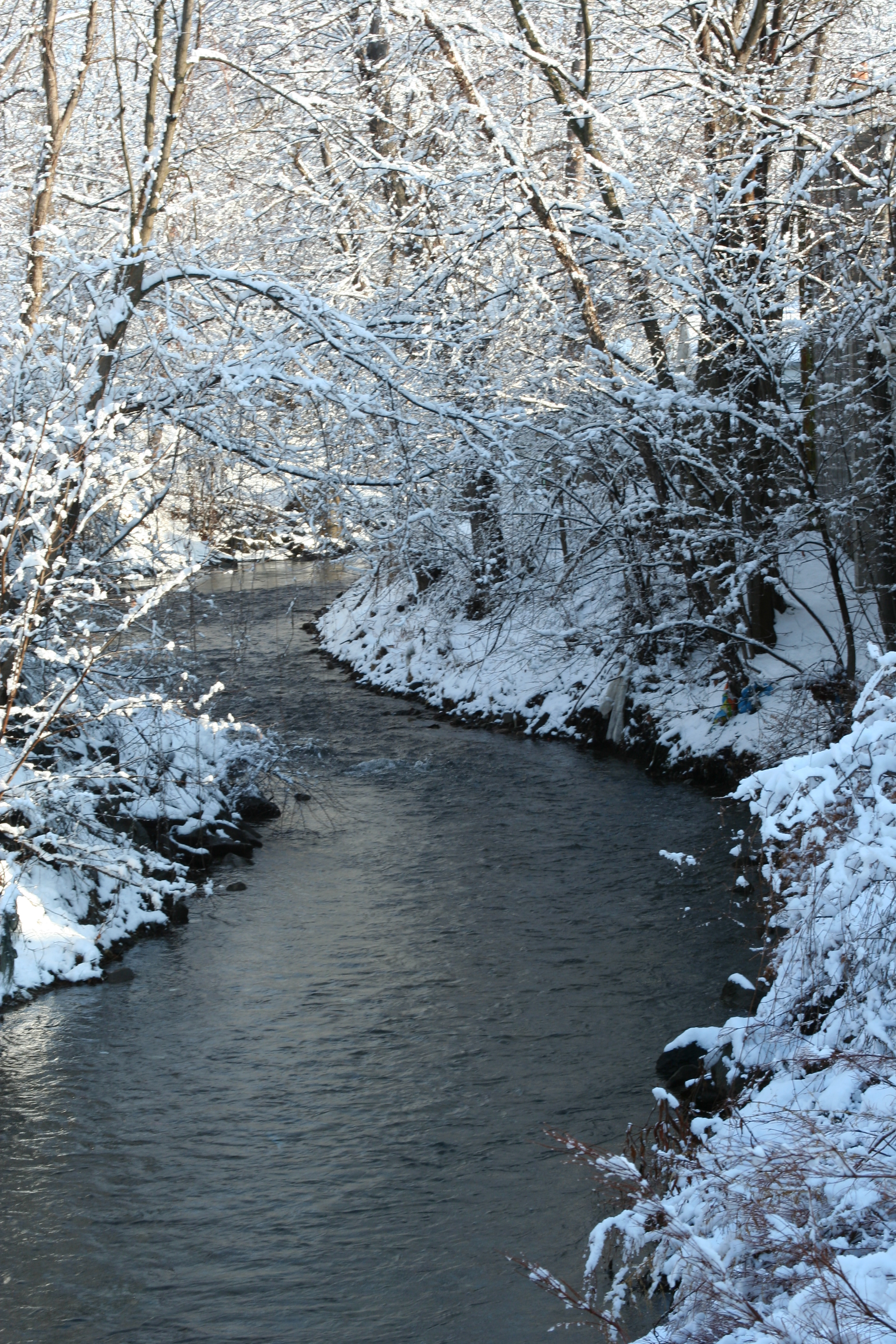
- Solomon Creek in wintertime

Physical characteristics
- Source
  - location: Fairview Township, Luzerne County, Pennsylvania
  - coordinates: 41°10′46″N 75°51′59″W
  - elevation: 1,840 ft (560 m)
- Mouth
  - location: Susquehanna River at Hanover Township, Luzerne County, Pennsylvania
  - coordinates: 41°13′24″N 75°57′14″W
  - elevation: 594 ft (181 m)
- Length: 8.5 mi (13.7 km)
- Basin size: 18.1 sq mi (47 km^{2})
- Discharge
  - average: 3.39 cu ft/s (0.096 m^{3}/s)

Basin features
- Progression: Susquehanna River, Chesapeake Bay
- Tributaries
  - left: Sugar Notch Run
  - right: Pine Creek, Spring Run

Solomon Creek is a tributary of the Susquehanna River in Luzerne County, Pennsylvania, in the United States. It is approximately 8.8 miles (14.2 km) long and flows through Fairview Township, Hanover Township, and Wilkes-Barre. The creek is affected by acid mine drainage and has significant loads of iron, aluminum, and manganese. The creek's named tributaries are Spring Run, Sugar Notch Run, and Pine Creek. The Solomon Creek watershed is located in the Anthracite Valley section of the ridge-and-valley geographical province. Major rock formations in the watershed include the Mauch Chunk Formation, the Spechty Kopf Formation, and the Catskill Formation.

Solomon Creek was first settled by Native Americans around 8000 to 6000 B.C.E. A settler arrived at the confluence of the creek with the Susquehanna River by 1774. In the 1800s, more people began arriving in the watershed to exploit its natural resources. Anthracite mining was especially prevalent in the watershed in the 19th and 20th centuries, to the point that numerous streams were altered or destroyed and the Laurel Run mine fire started.

Solomon Creek was devoid of fish in the 1970s. However, since then several fish species, including brook trout, have inhabited the creek and its tributaries. A number of varieties of aquatic insects are also present.

== Course ==
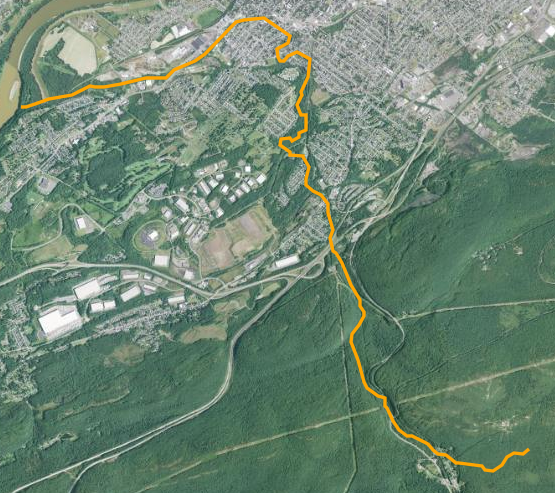
Satellite map of Solomon Creek

Solomon Creek starts on western Penobscot Mountain in northern Fairview Township and flows west down the mountain for a short distance before turning northwards, paralleling Pennsylvania Route 309 and briefly Pennsylvania Route 437. The creek then enters Hanover Township. It picks up Pine Creek and cuts a gap through Wilkes-Barre Mountain and then through Ashley. Upon leaving Ashley, it heads into Wilkes-Barre, picking up Sugar Notch Run and Spring Run. The creek soon turns west into Hanover Township again, having flowed 6 miles (9.7 km) by this point. It enters the Susquehanna River at Hanover Green.

=== Tributaries ===
Sugar Notch Run, Pine Creek and Spring Run are two tributaries of Solomon Creek. Sugar Notch Run is 3.46 miles (5.57 km) long, Pine Creek is 7.68 miles (12.36 km) long, and Spring Run is 2.93 miles (4.72 km) long. Spring Run is an intermittent stream. There are two other ephemeral tributaries that are not officially named, but are known locally as Sulfur Run and the Lee Park tributary.

Historically, Solomon Creek had at least seven tributaries, including one named Buttonwood Creek. However, several tributaries largely disappeared by the late 1890s due to mining in the watershed.

== Hydrology ==
Solomon Creek has an orange color as it flows past Wilkes-Barre, due to acid mine drainage.

The tributaries Sugar Notch Run and Spring Run lose most of their discharge (75% in the case of Spring Run) when passing over subterranean mine pools. The discharge of the creek is 3.39 cubic feet per second. Between 1938 and 1989, the highest recorded discharge of the creek was 2450 cubic feet per second. This occurred on August 18, 1955. The discharge was not higher than 1610 cubic feet per second on any other year during that time period.

The daily load of aluminum (Note: The daily load of a metal is the amount of the metal that flows through a creek daily in dissolved form.) in Solomon Creek ranges from 8.8 pounds (4.0 kg) at a site below Pine Creek to 87.9 pounds (39.9 kg) at the Buttonwood Tunnel. The average load is 29.6 pounds (13.4 kg) per day. The lowest load of iron is 0 pounds (0 kg) per day at the site below Pine Creek and Solomon Creek at Sugar Notch Run and the highest is 9,624 pounds (4,365 kg) per day at the Buttonwood Tunnel. The average is 2,305.5 pounds (1,045.8 kg) per day. The Solomon Creek boreholes and the Nottingham-Buttonwood Airshaft are the second-largest and third-largest sources of iron discharge in the Coal Region, contributing 9.07% and 7.85% of the iron load in the region, respectively. The daily load of manganese ranges between 0.7 pounds (0.32 kg) above Pine Creek and 1,086 pounds (493 kg) at the Buttonwood Tunnel and the average daily load is 260.1 pounds (118.0 kg). The load of acidity in the creek ranges from 0 at site SR to 1,506.1 pounds (683.2 kg) per day at the Buttonwood Tunnel. The average load of acidity per day is 628.9 pounds (285.3 kg). The alkalinity load ranges from 288.4 pounds (130.8 kg) on Sugar Notch Run to 135,660.8 pounds (61,534.7 kg) at the Buttonwood Tunnel. The average daily load of alkalinity is 23,716 pounds (10,757 kg).

At a large number of sites within the Solomon Creek watershed in 2011, the water temperature ranged from 34 °F (1 °C) at site SC12 to 70 °C (158 °F) at sites above, below, and on Sugar Notch Run. At these same sites, the pH ranged from 4.5 at a site on Sugar Notch Run to 7.5 two sites on an unnamed tributary, one site below Sugar Notch Run, and a site on another unnamed tributary. The iron concentration ranged from 0 at over 20 sites to 36 milligrams per liter at an acid mine drainage discharge in the watershed. The concentration of dissolved oxygen ranged from 0 at eight sites to 13 milligrams per liter at SU01, and on Pine Creek northeast of Pennsylvania Route 309 and below Unnamed Tributary 4.

There are six locations in the Solomon Creek watershed where mine drainage is discharged. Ten miles (sixteen kilometers) of the streams on the creek's watershed are rendered devoid of life by mine drainage.

According to Robert Hughes, the Eastern Pennsylvania Coalition for Abandoned Mine Reclamation's executive director, the water level of Solomon Creek has risen since the middle of the 19th century. There are large amounts of sediment along the creek. Sediment piles are over 2 feet (0.61 m) on the creek at Division Street and 3 or 4 feet (0.91 or 1.22 m) in the Brookside area. Sewage is discharged into the creek at several locations. It has been discharged into the creek since at least 1909. Additionally, there are debris dams in various areas on the creek.

== Geology ==
Solomon Creek is located at the edge of the ridge and valley geographic province, in the Anthracite Valley section. There is a ridge in the creek's watershed called the Wilkes-Barre Mountain. On the ridge, the Mauch Chunk Formation exists, with red shale, sandstone, and siltstone. Other significant rock formations in the watershed include the Pocono Formation with olive and gray rocks and the Spechty Kopf formation. Under the Spechty Kopf formation lie rocks of the Catskill Formation. The watershed is located in the Wyoming Coal Basin, the southwestern sub-basin of the Coal Region. The creek's headwaters have glacial deposition from the Wisconsonian glacial period. At the headwaters of the tributary Spring Creek, there is a rock formation of light gray conglomerate called Prospect Rock. It is 1,394 feet (425 m) above sea level and 2.25 miles (3.62 km) southeast of Wilkes-Barre's Public Square.

An unconformity lies between the Catskill Formation and the Spechty Kopf Formation. The sandstone in the latter formation are mostly cross-bedded, although some areas have planar bedding. The Llewellyn Formation, containing conglomerate and sandstone is found in the Spring Run and Sugar Notch Run sub-watersheds.

The upper part of Solomon Creek is located in the Pocono Plateau. The lowest elevation in the watershed is 560 feet (170 m) on the western side of the creek's floodplain. The highest elevation is 2,148 feet (655 m) on Haystack Mountain. The elevation of the creek's mouth is 594 feet (181 m) above sea level. The creek's source is just under 1,840 feet (560 m) above sea level.

There are 14 coal seams in the Solomon Creek watershed. The deepest seam is the Bottom Red Ash. Other seams included the Middle Red Ash, the Top Red Ash, the Checker Bed, the Pittston Bed, the Ross Bed, the Skidmore Bed, the Kidney Bed, the Snake Island Bed, the Hillman Bed, and the Abbott Bed. There are also three numbered beds called the #2, #3, and #4 beds. Historically, parts of the seams were within 50 feet (15 m) of the surface, but they were completely mined. Areas along the banks of the creek are covered in coal ash, coal silt, sand, and gravel. There are gravel bars and point bars in the lower reaches of the creek. The lower reaches of Solomon Creek have a 0.2% grade.

In the Solomon Gap, there are piles coal ash that is pink and orange due to oxidation. These piles rise as high as 60 to 100 feet (18 to 30 m). Similarly colored coal is found in sediment and gravel bars in the creek.

=== Soils ===
Soils in the Pennsylvania State Game Lands Number 207, in the Solomon Creek watershed, include the Arnot Rock outcrop complex. On hills with a grade higher than 25%, the steep variety of this soil appears. It is a dark brown silt loam with a bedrock depth of 12 inches (30 cm). It has fast runoff and 3% to 40% of the surface is covered with boulders. The regular variety of this soil, which occurs on slopes with a grade of 8% to 25%, is the same, but has a bedrock depth of 18 inches (46 cm) and slower runoff.

== Watershed ==
The area of Solomon Creek's watershed is 18.2 square miles.

The watershed area is 60% forested land and 26% developed land. Nearly 7% of the land is considered disturbed by the U.S. Environmental Protection Agency. This includes abandoned coal mines and quarries. In specific, 6748 acres are forest, 1839 acres are considered "low-intensity development" by the Environmental Protection Agency, 1174 acres are considered "high-intensity development" by the Environmental Protection Agency 509 acres are devoted to hay or pastureland, and 492 acres are considered "transition" by the Environmental Protection Agency. Crops are grown on 336 acres, quarries occupy 215 acres, wetland makes up 77 acres, coal mines make up 64 acres, and grass occupies 22 acres. There are a total of 26.66 miles (42.91 km) stream miles in the watershed. Deciduous forest occupies much of the southern part of the watershed. Most of the agricultural land is located on a floodplain at the mouth of the creek.

There are nine municipalities in the Solomon Creek watershed. Most of the watershed is in Ashley, Laurel Run, Wilkes-Barre Township, and Hanover Township. Smaller parts of the watershed are in Wilkes-Barre, Bear Creek Township, Fairview Township, Rice Township, and Sugar Notch.

In the 2000 United States census, there were 928 households in the Solomon Creek area and an average household size of 4.6 people. This indicates a population of 4269 for the Solomon Creek watershed. There is a higher-than-average concentration of people over 65 years of age in the watershed. Major roads in the watershed include Interstate 81 and Pennsylvania Route 309.

There are five designated sub-watersheds of the Solomon Creek watershed. They are the upper and lower Solomon Creek watershed, the Pine Creek watershed, the Spring Run watershed, and the Sugar Notch Run watershed. Neighboring watersheds include those of Little Wapwallopen Creek and Big Wapwallopen Creek.

== History ==
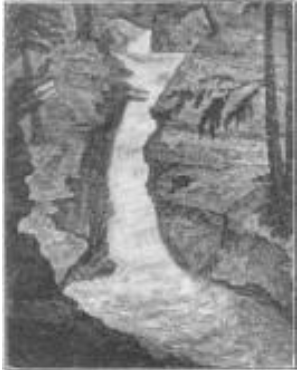
1809 woodcut of the Solomon Creek falls

Native Americans settled in the Solomon Creek watershed by approximately 8000 B.C. to 6000 B.C. Ebenezer Hibbard was an early European settler on the creek, living there by 1772. The creek is named after a person with the surname of Solomon, who settled at the mouth of the creek in 1774. In the early 1800s, Europeans first realized the natural resources of the watershed. In the early 1800s, there was a tavern called Inman's Tavern and several cabins in the Solomon Gap. In the mid-1800s, the population of the watershed increased significantly due to coal mining and timbering opportunities. The first road in Fairview Township, the Wilkes-Barre and Hazleton Turnpike, started at Solomon Creek.

There are waterfalls called Solomon's Falls on Solomon Creek. They were called a "beautiful cascade" by Philadelphia's Portfolio in 1809, although a 1909 book stated that the waterfalls were no longer "picturesque" or "delightful". The falls were between 50 and 60 feet (15 and 18 m).

In 1809, Richard and Israel Inman constructed a gristmill at the foot of Solomon's Falls. It was converted to a house in 1833 and destroyed in 1850. A gristmill on the creek in Hanover Township had been built by 1812 and was run by George Mesinger. It was destroyed in 1840. In 1845, William Petty constructed the gristmill called Petty Mill in Hanover Township. This mill burned down in 1887. The Wyoming Division Canal, which was constructed in the 1830s, started at Solomon Creek. Construction of the Ashley Planes in the Solomon Creek gap began in 1837. They were used until 1848. An iron-producing forge operated on the creek in Ashley until 1839. There was also a sawmill on it until 1839. A powder mill operated on Solomon Creek, but was replaced with a brewery by 1885. A slaughterhouse discharged its waste into the creek in the early 20th century. The creek was used as the water supply for the Huber Breaker from the 1930s to the 1970s. The Wilkes-Barre and Hazleton Railway passed over Solomon Creek.

Mining has been done in the Solomon Creek watershed in the past, causing considerable environmental damage. The mining began in the beginning of the 1800s and continued until the 1970s. However, there was one strip mining permit in the watershed in the late 1990s. Starting in 1967, the mine pools under the creek stopped having water pumped out of them. This led to them flooding and damaging buildings in the watershed in 1972 during Hurricane Agnes. To remedy the problem of the flooding, the Buttonwood Tunnel and three boreholes known as the South Wilkes-Barre Boreholes were created. The water quality of the creek was assessed in 1970 as part of Operation Scarlift. A 1977 study by the Pennsylvania Fish and Boat Commission observed brook trout inhabiting the watershed, although the stream was listed as impaired on account of the mining. A plan called the Solomon Creek Cold Water Conservation Plan was initiated in the summer of 2011 and continued into 2012.

A mine fire known as the Laurel Run mine fire started burning in the watershed of Solomon Creek since 1915, when a miner accidentally left a carbide lamp hanging from a timber support in the Red Ash Coal Mine. The lamp caused the support to catch fire. The fire may continue into the 22nd century. The fire was contained in 1973, but was not extinguished. Had the fire not been contained, it would have eventually spread under the entirety of the Wyoming Valley. The fire burns between 200 and 300 feet (61 and 91 m) underground at a temperature of approximately 1,000 °F (538 °C).

The creek flooded in September 1850. It was the most severe flood of the creek up to that time. In January 1996, 400 buildings along Solomon Creek flooded by it due to melting snow. This was one of numerous floods on that area of the creek.

=== Alternate names ===
Solomon Creek has also been called Chester Creek and Solomon Creek by locals. It was called Moses Creek on maps of Pennsylvania created by William Scull in the 1770s. This last name may be named after an Indian, although it is not known for sure.

== Biology ==
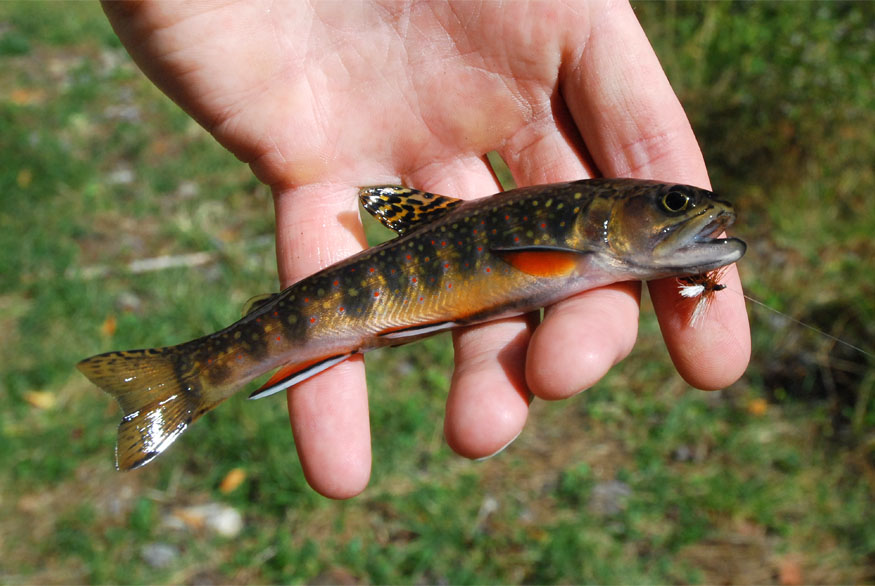
An Appalachian brook trout

In 1975, a study found no fish species on the creek. However, brook trout have been observed at seven locations on Solomon Creek. Brook trout are especially common on the tributary Sugar Notch Run. Trout reproduce everywhere in the tributary Pine Creek and reproduce in the main stem as far downstream as southern Wilkes-Barre. Above of the South Wilkes-Barre borehole, a number of other fish species have been observed. These include eastern blacknose dace, bluegill, creek chub, fallfish, minnows, northern hog sucker, and white sucker. However, there are no species of fish downstream of the borehole. Out of 46 sites on the creek, 30 had sufficient macroinvertebrate concentrations to support trout. 2.6 stream miles in the watershed are home to brook trout fisheries. This area is in Hanover Township, Laurel Run, and Bear Creek Township.

The most common aquatic insects at the headwaters of unimpaired streams in the watershed of Solomon Creek are alderflies, caddis flies, dragonflies, mayflies, and stoneflies. Three sites in the watershed are considered "suboptimal" according to the WVSOS system. 20 sites are considered "marginal" and the remainder are "poor".

== Recreation ==
The Pennsylvania State Game Lands Number 207 are located in the southeastern part of the Solomon Creek Watershed. They take up 6.7% of the watershed. Parts of Pinchot State Forest are also in the watershed; the forest occupies 12.6% of it. Two of the trails in the 139-acre Sugar Notch Trail System are located in the sub-watershed of Sugar Notch Run. The creek is stocked with trout in some places. There are ATV trails in the watershed.

== See also ==
- Warrior Creek, next tributary of the Susquehanna River going downriver
- Coal Creek (Susquehanna River), next tributary of the Susquehanna River going upriver
- List of rivers of Pennsylvania
