= Sugar Notch Run =

Physical characteristics
- Source
  - location: Wilkes-Barre Mountain in Hanover Township, Luzerne County, Pennsylvania
  - elevation: between 1,120 and 1,140 feet (340 and 350 m)
- Mouth
  - location: Solomon Creek in Ashley, Luzerne County, Pennsylvania
  - coordinates: 41°13′03″N 75°54′27″W
  - elevation: 584 ft (178 m)
- Length: 3.0 mi (4.8 km)
- Basin size: 2.33 sq mi (6.0 km^{2})
- Discharge
  - average: 1.17 million US gallons per day (1.81 cu ft/s; 0.051 m^{3}/s)

Basin features
- Progression: Solomon Creek → Susquehanna River → Chesapeake Bay

Sugar Notch Run is a tributary of Solomon Creek in Luzerne County, Pennsylvania, in the United States. It is approximately 3.0 miles (4.8 km) long and flows through Hanover Township, Sugar Notch, and Ashley. The watershed of the stream has an area of 2.33 square miles (6.0 km^{2}). The stream is considered to be impaired by abandoned mine drainage for its entire length. Brook trout and various macroinvertebrate taxa inhabit portions of the stream and it is designated as a Coldwater Fishery. Coal mining has historically been done in the watershed and a small intake dam was on the stream in the early 1900s. Recreational opportunities in the watershed include the Sugar Notch Trail System and Pennsylvania State Game Lands Number 207.

== Course ==
Sugar Notch Run begins on Wilkes-Barre Mountain in Hanover Township. It flows west-southwest for several tenths of a mile before turning north, passing through the valley of Sugar Notch and crossing Interstate 81. After several tenths of a mile, the stream briefly passes through the community of Sugar Notch before reentering Hanover Township and turns northeast. After a few tenths of a mile, it turns north-northeast, crossing Pennsylvania Route 29. The stream then turns north-northeast before turning north and entering the community of Ashley. In Ashley, it meanders north for some distance before reaching its confluence with Solomon Creek.

Sugar Notch Run joins Solomon Creek 4.40 miles (7.08 km) upstream of its mouth.

== Hydrology ==
Sugar Notch Run is considered by the Pennsylvania Department of Environmental Protection to be impaired for its entire length. The source of the impairment is acid mine drainage and the cause of the impairment is flow alteration. The stream also has high levels of suspended solids and a low pH. The stream is also impaired by urban runoff and storm sewers. It experiences pollution including the dumping of trash and tires, as well as various other artificial blockages of the stream channel. It is also affected by woody debris and sedimentation, as well as undercut streambanks.

The discharge of Sugar Notch Run is 1.17 million gallons per day. The water temperature at five points on the stream has been measured as being between 62 and 70 °F (17 and 21 °C). The pH ranges from 4.5 to 7.0 at these sites, half of which have pHs of under 6 and two have pHs under 5. These two sites are the only places in the watershed of Solomon Creek that are too acidic to support aquatic life. The minimum concentration of dissolved oxygen in the stream is 0 milligrams per liter, which occurs at two sites. The maximum concentration is 9 milligrams per liter.

The concentration of iron in the waters of Sugar Notch Run is 0.44 milligrams per liter and the load is 4.3 pounds (2.0 kg) per day. It requires no reduction to meet its total maximum daily load requirements. The concentration of manganese in the stream is 0.50 milligrams per liter and the load is 4.9 pounds (2.2 kg) per day. It requires a 50 percent reduction to meet its total maximum daily load requirements. The concentration of aluminum in the waters of the stream is 1.28 milligrams per liter and the daily load of it is 12.5 pounds (5.7 kg). It requires an 87 percent reduction to meet its total maximum daily load requirements.

The acidity concentration in the waters of Sugar Notch Run is 30.96 milligrams per liter and the daily load is 302.1 pounds (137.0 kg). It requires a 70 percent reduction to meet its total maximum daily load requirements. The alkalinity concentration of the stream is 29.56 milligrams per liter and the daily load is 288.4 pounds (130.8 kg).

== Geography and geology ==
The elevation near the mouth of Sugar Notch Run is 584 feet (178 m) above sea level. The elevation of the stream's source is between 1,120 and 1,140 feet (340 and 350 m) above sea level.

Sugar Notch Run loses some of its flow to subterranean mine pools. The cracks in its streambed can be up to 4 inches (10 cm) wide. In the stream's watershed, there are some cropfalls hundreds of feet deep lead into underground mine workings.

In the early 1900s, there was a small intake dam on Sugar Notch Run approximately 0.5 miles (0.80 km) upstream of the Sugar Notch borough line. The dam is at an elevation of 930 feet (280 m) and drains an area of 1.35 square miles (3.5 km^{2}). It has a capacity of 20,000 gallons or less. The dam was made of concrete and masonry and had a height of 8 feet (2.4 m).

The valley of Sugar Notch is in the vicinity of Sugar Notch Run. Red shale, siltstone, and sandstone of the Mauch Chunk Formation occurs there. The Llewellyn Formation also occurs in the stream's watershed. Coal was historically mined in this formation.

The southeastern headwaters of Sugar Notch Run are on Wilkes-Barre Mountain and the southwestern headwaters are on Penobscot Mountain.

== Watershed ==
The watershed of Sugar Notch Run has an area of 2.33 square miles (6.0 km^{2}). The stream is entirely within the United States Geological Survey quadrangle of Wilkes-Barre West. There are 3.46 miles (5.57 km) of streams in the watershed. This is slightly under 13 percent of all the streams in the watershed of Solomon Creek.

The headwaters of Sugar Notch Run are in a forested area. However, the stream flows through abandoned mining lands for a substantial portion of its length. The stream is situated in the western and southwestern parts of the watershed of Solomon Creek.

The Hanover Township Youth Recreational Complex, the Preston Hose Company, and the Ashley Fire Hall are all in the watershed of Sugar Notch Run. The pump house that historically fed the Huber Breaker is also in the watershed.

== History and recreation ==
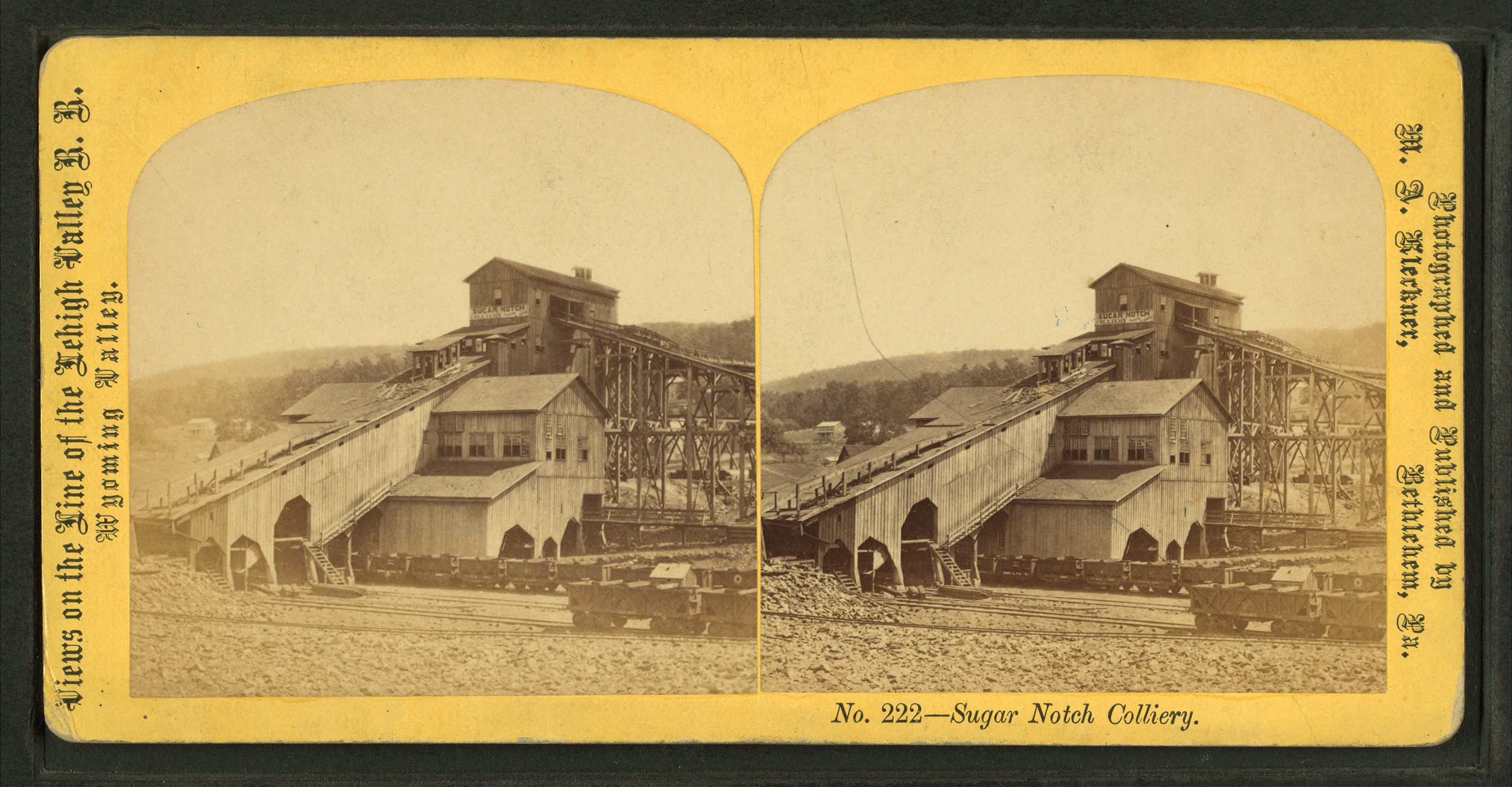
Sugar Notch colliery, by M. A. Kleckner

Sugar Notch Run was entered into the Geographic Names Information System on August 2, 1979. Its identifier in the Geographic Names Information System is 1188956.

Coal mining has been done in the vicinity of Sugar Notch Run. The Lucky Strike Coal Company was found guilty of illegally discharging wastewater into Sugar Notch Run in November 1979.

Sugar Notch was listed as an impaired stream in 2004. Pollution along the stream was cleaned up by the Eastern Pennsylvania Coalition for Abandoned Mine Restoration in 2013.

A prestressed box beam bridge carrying State Route 2010 over Sugar Notch Run was constructed in 1961. It is 30.8 feet (9.4 m) long and is situated in Hanover Township.

The Sugar Notch Trail System is located in the watershed of Sugar Run. It consists of two trails: the Ridge Top Trail and the Park Access Trail. The former is 3.06 miles (4.92 km) long and the latter is 0.64 miles (1.03 km) long. The stream passes through the Greater Hanover Recreation Park. Pennsylvania State Game Lands Number 207 are in the watershed's upper reaches.

== Biology ==
Sugar Notch Run is designated as a Coldwater Fishery. Brook trout are common in it both upstream and downstream of Interstate 81. The trout occur upstream of the Hanover Area Recreation Fields. The stream is designated for use by aquatic life.

Sugar Notch Run has a riparian buffer in its headwaters.

Some sections of Sugar Notch Run are not inhabited by any benthic macroinvertebrates. However, other sections of the stream do have populations of benthic macroinvertebrates, including mayflies and taxa from the orders Ephemeroptera, Plecoptera, and Trichoptera. Cranefly larvae have been observed in the stream.

== See also ==
- Spring Run, next tributary of Solomon Creek going downstream
- Pine Creek (Solomon Creek), next tributary of Solomon Creek going upstream
- List of rivers of Pennsylvania
