= Spring Run (Solomon Creek tributary) =

Physical characteristics
- Source
  - location: near Pennsylvania Route 309 in Wilkes-Barre, Luzerne County, Pennsylvania
  - elevation: between 640 and 660 feet (200 and 200 m)
- Mouth
  - location: Solomon Creek in Hanover Township, Luzerne County, Pennsylvania
  - coordinates: 41°13′22″N 75°54′17″W
  - elevation: 577 ft (176 m)
- Length: 2.1 mi (3.4 km)
- Basin size: 4.34 sq mi (11.2 km^{2})

Basin features
- Progression: Solomon Creek → Susquehanna River → Chesapeake Bay

Spring Run is a tributary of Solomon Creek in Luzerne County, Pennsylvania, in the United States. It is approximately 2.1 miles (3.4 km) long and flows through Wilkes-Barre and Hanover Township. The watershed of the stream has an area of 4.34 square miles (11.2 km^{2}). The stream is considered to be impaired by abandoned mine drainage. It is designated as a Coldwater Fishery, but is devoid of fish life. However, it does have some macroinvertebrates. Coal was mined in the stream's watershed in the past. At least one bridge crosses the stream.

== Course ==
Spring Run begins in Wilkes-Barre, near Pennsylvania Route 309 and nor far from the village of Georgetown. It flows west-southwest for a short distance before turning northwest and then west-southwest again. After a few tenths of a mile, the stream turns southwest for a few tenths of a mile and then turns west. After several tenths of a mile, it turns west-southwest, exiting Wilkes-Barre and entering Hanover Township. The stream then turns south for several hundred feet before turning west and reaching its confluence with Solomon Creek.

Spring Run joins Solomon Creek 3.82 miles (6.15 km) upstream of its mouth.

=== Tributaries ===
Spring Run has no named tributaries. However, it does have an unnamed tributary which joins Spring Run at the corner of Blackman Street and New Frederick Street. It also has a tributary known locally as Sulfur Run.

== Hydrology ==
The entire length of Spring Run is considered by the Pennsylvania Department of Environmental Protection to be impaired. The source of the impairment is abandoned mine drainage and the cause is metals and siltation. The abandoned mine drainage in the watershed has caused the stream to have a low pH and high levels of suspended solids.

The concentration of iron in the waters of Spring Run is 3.30 milligrams per liter and the daily load is 128.3 pounds (58.2 kg). It requires an 87 percent reduction to meet the stream's total maximum daily load requirements. The concentration of manganese in the stream is 0.36 milligrams per liter and the load is 14.0 pounds (6.4 kg). It requires an 11 percent reduction to meet the stream's total maximum daily load requirements. The aluminum concentration is 0.69 milligrams per liter and the daily load is 26.8 pounds (12.2 kg) per day. It requires an 85 percent reduction to meet the stream's total maximum daily load requirements.

The concentration of alkalinity in the waters of Spring Run is 97.5 milligrams per liter. The daily load of it is 3,789.3 pounds (1,718.8 kg) per day. The pH of the stream ranges from 6.5 to 6.7.

The discharge of Spring Run is 4.66 million gallons per day. However, it is an intermittent stream, only flowing during storm flows or rainfall. The watershed is mostly dry because the stream loses its flow to mine voids and permeable stream channels. The peak annual discharge of the stream has a 10 percent chance of reaching 540 cubic feet per second and a 2 percent chance of reaching 1025 cubic feet per second. It has a 1 percent chance of reaching 1325 cubic feet per second and a 0.2 percent chance of reaching 2200 cubic feet per second.

The Solomon Creek Coldwater Conservation Plan described Spring Run as "one of the most degraded tributaries assessed in the Solomon Creek watershed".

== Geography and geology ==
The elevation near the mouth of Spring Run is 577 feet (176 m) above sea level. The elevation of the stream's source is between 640 and 660 feet (200 and 200 m) above sea level.

In the total maximum daily load document for Solomon Creek, Spring Run is described as being a small stream. It loses most of its water to underground mine pools.

Both surface mines and deep mines occur in the watershed of Spring Run. Abandoned mining lands are present in the watershed.

A rock formation known as Prospect Rock is located near the uppermost reaches of the watershed of Spring Run at an elevation of 1,300 feet (400 m) above sea level and 794 feet (242 m) above the Susquehanna River. It is approximately 2.5 miles (4.0 km) southeast of Public Square in Wilkes-Barre. Prospect Rock is a small and irregularly-shaped rock ledge made of very light grayish conglomerate. Nearly all of the Wyoming Valley can be seen from the rock.

== Watershed ==
The watershed of Spring Run has an area of 4.34 square miles (11.2 km^{2}). The mouth of the stream is in the United States Geological Survey quadrangle of Wilkes-Barre West. However, its source is in the quadrangle of Wilkes-Barre East. There are a total of 2.93 miles (4.72 km) of streams in the watershed.

Most of the watershed of Spring Run drains the northwestern part of Wilkes-Barre Mountain as well as the communities of Georgetown, Laurel Run, and Wilkes-Barre Township. The stream is one source of flooding in Hanover Township.

Pennsylvania Route 309 and Interstate 81 pass through the watershed of Spring Run in an east-to-west direction. A tract of Pinchot State Forest is in the stream's watershed.

Spring Run and its watershed are situated in the northeastern part of the watershed of Solomon Creek. The stream's watershed is located immediately to the north of that of Pine Creek, another tributary of Solomon Creek.

== History ==
Spring Run was entered into the Geographic Names Information System on August 2, 1979. Its identifier in the Geographic Names Information System is 1188273.

Coal mining has been done in the watershed of Spring Run. The Empire Silk Mill also once operated in the stream's watershed. It is the last standing mill in Wilkes-Barre.

A prestressed box beam bridge carrying South Empire Street over Spring Run was constructed in 1972. It is 63.0 feet (19.2 m) long. A concrete culvert bridge carrying McLean Street over the stream was constructed in 1991. It is 30.8 feet (9.4 m) long.

== Biology ==
Spring Run is considered to be a Coldwater Fishery. However, no trout inhabit the stream.

Twenty percent of the macroinvertebrate taxa inhabiting Spring Run are of the orders Ephemeroptera, Plecoptera, and Trichoptera. None of the taxa are mayflies.

== See also ==
- Sugar Notch Run, next tributary of Solomon Creek going upstream
- List of rivers of Pennsylvania
