= Mill Creek (Susquehanna River tributary) =

River in Pennsylvania, United States

Coordinates: 41°15′38″N 75°52′12″W

Mill Creek is a tributary of the Susquehanna River in Luzerne County, Pennsylvania in the United States. It is 8.7 miles (14.0 km) long. Its watershed is approximately 36 square miles in area. The creek flows through Plains Township, Bear Creek Township, and Wilkes-Barre.

== Course ==
Mill Creek begins at the southeastern edge of Plains Township, at the Mill Creek Reservoir. It heads southwest into Bear Creek Township, where it crosses under Interstate 476 and turns northwest, returning to Plains Township. After some distance, it turns west, passing by the Mill Creek Intake Dam and receiving the tributary Deep Creek. Shortly afterwards, it crosses under Interstate 81 and Pennsylvania Route 315 and turns southwest again, roughly skirting the border between Plains Township and the city of Wilkes-Barre. The creek soon turns south, following the city border and it receives the tributary Laurel Run before crossing Pennsylvania Route 309 and turning west. A short distance downstream of Pennsylvania Route 309, it reaches its mouth at the Susquehanna River.

=== Tributaries ===
Tributaries of Mill Creek include Gardner Creek, Laurel Run and Coal Brook. There are also a number of minor tributaries, including some unnamed ones.

== Hydrology and climate ==
Mill Creek is affected by acid mine drainage, which comes from the South Wilkes-Barre Boreholes in the Solomon Creek watershed. Another cause of the pollution is the creek's waters entering deep mines. In the 1970s, there was one discharge of raw sewage or treated waste on the main stem.

The water quality of Mill Creek decreases downstream of its confluence with Gardener Creek, but increases downstream of its confluence with Laurel Run, due to a Concentration#Qualitative descriptiondilution effect.

Near its mouth, the pH of Mill Creek was measured to be 6.9 in the mid-1970s. The concentration of acidity was 5 parts per million and the concentration of alkalinity was 11 parts per million. The concentration of iron was 1.47 milligrams per liter and the sulfate concentration was 35 milligrams per liter.

At another location on Mill Creek above the coal mining parts of the watershed (denoted as M-19 on an Operation Scarlift report), the pH ranged from 5.4 to 6.5, the concentration of acidity ranged from 0 to 8 parts per million, and the concentration of alkalinity ranged from 8 to 26 parts per million. The iron concentration ranged from 0 to 0.2 parts per million and the sulfate concentration ranged from 8 to 55 parts per million. The water temperature ranged from 2 °C (36 °F) to 23 °C (73 °F).

In Wilkes-Barre, the annual precipitation was measured to be 44.7 inches (114 cm) from 1975 to 1976.

== Geography and geology ==
The Mill Creek watershed is in southeastern part of the Wyoming Valley and 32 percent of the watershed is in the Wyoming Coal Basin. The middle reaches of Mill Creek experience erosion near Bald Mountain Road. The lowest elevation in the watershed is 530 feet (160 m) above sea level at the confluence of the creek with the Susquehanna River. The highest elevation is 2,160 feet (660 m) above sea level on the tops of ridges on the southeastern edge of the watershed. The Southeast Mine Pool Complex lies under the watershed of the creek, as well as nearby creeks such as Solomon Creek, Nanticoke Creek, and Warrior Creek.

Downstream of the Coalbrook Dam, the tributary Laurel Run is over bedrock that is fractured.

The Mill Creek watershed is in the Appalachian Mountain section of the ridge and valley physiographic region.

The Red Ash coal seam is found in the Mill Creek watershed. In the watershed, it can be found as low as 800 feet (240 m) below sea level. However, on the tributary Gardener Creek, the coal appears at the surface.

The Spechty Kopf formation occupies much of the southern part of the Mill Creek watershed (in Bear Creek and Jenkins Townships, mostly), along with some areas of the Pocono Formation or the Duncannon member of the Catskill Formation. North of the Spechty Kopf formation lies the Pocono Formation. It is found in Laurel Run, Northern Bear Creek Township, southern Plains Township, southern Jenkins Township, and central Pittston Township. The Mauch Chunk Formation is north of the Pocono Formation. It is found in southern Wilkes-Barre Township and Plains Township, central Jenkins Township, and northern Bear Creek Township and Pittston Township. The Pottsville Group is found in central Wilkes-Barre Township and Plains Township, in central and northern Jenkins Township, and in Laflin. The Llwellyn Formation is found in the northwesternmost reaches of the watershed, including northern Wilkes-Barre Township, Wilkes-Barre, and northern Plains Township.

The Oquaga-Wellsboro-Lackawanna soil association is found in the upper reaches of Mill Creek as well as in the southwestern part of the watershed. The Oquaga-Lordstown-Arnot soil association is found a large portion of the central reaches of the watershed and the Chenango-Pope-Wyoming is found in a small part of the central reaches of the watershed. The Strip mine-Mine dump soil association is found in the northern part of the watershed, near the Susquehanna River, and also in parts of the central reaches of the watershed.

There is a levee on Mill Creek in the Parsons region of Wilkes-Barre.

== Watershed ==
The watershed of Mill Creek has an area of 35.87 square miles. Portions of eight municipalities are in the watershed. These include Bear Creek Township, Plains Township, Pittston Township, Jenkins Township, Wilkes-Barre Township, Wilkes-Barre, Laflin, and Laurel Run.

Most of the upper reaches of the Mill Creek watershed are forested or otherwise rural, while most of the lower reaches are urban areas.

Forest occupies 26.24 square miles (73.17%) of the Mill Creek watershed, making it the largest land use. Residential properties of 0.125 acres or less makes up 1.6 square miles (4.47%) of the watershed and commercial land occupies 1.15 square miles (3.2%). 1.06 square miles (2.96%) of the watershed is occupied by a combination of forested and mining lands and 0.86 (2.4%) is occupied by a combination of industrial and commercial land. 0.8 square miles (2.24%) of the watershed are meadows, 0.68 square miles (1.9%) are residential properties between 0.25 and 0.33 acres, and 0.63 square miles (1.74%) are residential properties between 0.5 and 1.0 acres. 0.53 square miles (1.47%) is occupied by residential properties of 2.0 to 4.0 acres, 0.52 square miles (1.46%) is open space, and 0.5 square miles (1.39%) is a combination of forest and meadow.

0.46 square miles (1.29%) of the Mill Creek watershed are used for mining, 0.43 (1.2%) are paved, and 0.26 (0.71%) are water. 0.11 square miles (0.32%) are industrial and 0.03 square miles (0.08%) are institutional.

The main arterial roads in the Mill Creek watershed are Pennsylvania Route 315, Pennsylvania Route 115, and Interstate 476.

== History ==
A small sawmill was built by the Pennamite settlers near the mouth of Mill Creek in spring 1771. In early 1772, Nathan Chapman gained 40 acres of land on a mill site on Mill Creek from the proprietors of Wilkes-Barre Township. This mill operated until October 24, 1784. New mills were built on the creek in 1781 or 1782 and remained in operation until 1787.

A number of European settlers arrived at a blockhouse in the summer of 1771 and remained there until at least 1772.
