= Warrior Creek (Pennsylvania) =

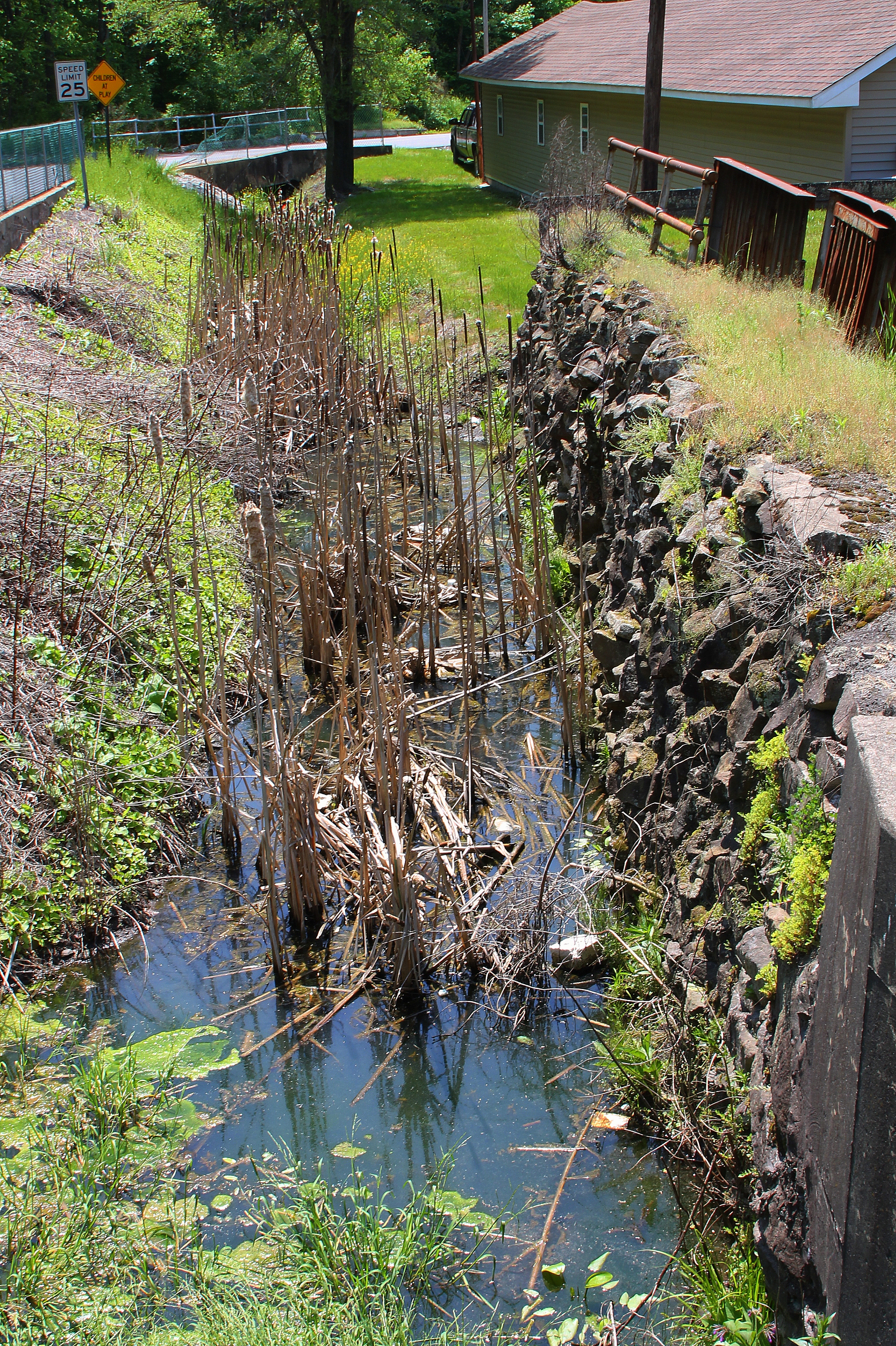
- Warrior Creek looking upstream

Physical characteristics
- Source
  - location: northern base of Wilkes-Barre Mountain on the border between Warrior Run, Luzerne County, Pennsylvania and Sugar Notch, Luzerne County, Pennsylvania
  - elevation: between 760 and 780 feet (230 and 240 m)
- Mouth
  - location: Susquehanna River in Hanover Township, Luzerne County, Pennsylvania
  - coordinates: 41°12′47″N 75°58′28″W
  - elevation: 531 ft (162 m)
- Length: 3.0 mi (4.8 km)
- Basin size: 4.51 sq mi (11.7 km^{2})

Basin features
- Progression: Susquehanna River → Chesapeake Bay
- Tributaries
  - right: one unnamed tributary

Warrior Creek is a tributary of the Susquehanna River in Luzerne County, Pennsylvania, in the United States. It is approximately 3.0 miles (4.8 km) long and flows through Warrior Run, Sugar Notch, and Hanover Township. The watershed of the creek has an area of 4.51 square miles (11.7 km^{2}). It is designated as a Coldwater Fishery. However, it is considered to be impaired by abandoned mine drainage. The surficial geology in the creek's vicinity consists of alluvium, fill, urban land, strip mining land, Wisconsinan Till, and bedrock.

== Course ==
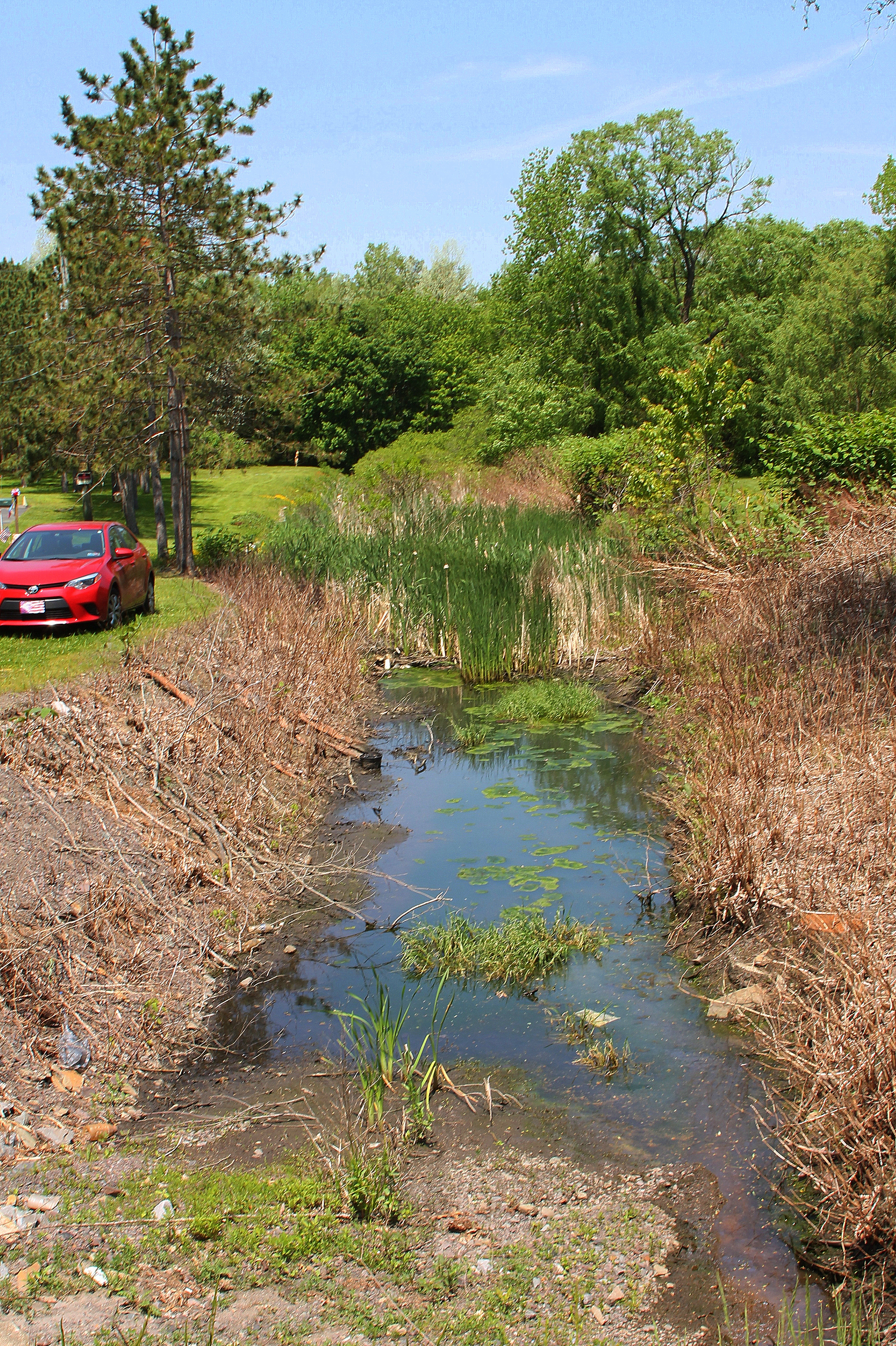
Warrior Creek looking downstream

Warrior Creek begins on the northern base of Wilkes-Barre Mountain on the border between Warrior Run and Sugar Notch. It flows west for a short distance along the border before turning north for a few tenths of a mile, still following the border. It then turns west for a short distance and enters Warrior Run. At this point, the creek turns north-northwest for more than a mile, entering Hanover Township and crossing Pennsylvania Route 29/South Cross Valley Expressway. It then turns north-northwest and receives an unnamed tributary from the right. At this point, the creek turns west-northwest for more than a mile. It crosses the Sans Souci Parkway and reaches its confluence with the Susquehanna River.

Warrior Creek joins the Susquehanna River 183.32 miles (295.02 km) upriver of its mouth.

== Hydrology ==
Warrior Creek is considered to be an impaired stream. The causes of impairment are flow alterations and siltation/sedimentation. The likely source of the impairment is abandoned mine drainage.

Warrior Creek lacks any major base flow until downstream of Middle Road. However, the largest abandoned mine drainage discharge in the creek's watershed has a discharge of up to 75 gallons per minute. The water of the creek downstream of Middle Road is alkaline as of 1975. This is due to raw sewage discharges.

During several measurements in 1973 and 1974, the discharge of Warrior Creek ranged from 0 to 70 gallons per minute at the outlet of a culvert Middle Road. At the inlet of the culvert, the discharge ranged from 0 to 60 gallons per minute. At two pipes carrying the creek under a strip mining road, the creek was dry at most measurements.

During several measurements in 1973 and 1974, the water temperature of Warrior Creek ranged from 0 to 15 °C (32 to 59 °F) at the outlet of a culvert on Middle Road. At the inlet of the culvert, the water temperature ranged from 0 to 27 °C (32 to 81 °F). At the outlet of the culvert on Middle Road, the creek's pH ranged from 4.50 to 7.40. At the inlet of the culvert, the pH ranged from 6.55 to 8.45.

== Geography and geology ==
The elevation near the mouth of Warrior Creek is 531 feet (162 m) above sea level. The elevation of the creek's source is between 760 and 780 feet (230 and 240 m) above sea level.

The headwaters of Warrior Creek are in strip mines. Most of the watershed overlies coal measures. A mountain known as Wilkes-Barre Mountain is also in the upper reaches of the watershed.

The surficial geology in the vicinity of Warrior Creek mainly consists of strip mining land, urban land, a glacial or resedimented till known as Wisconsinan Till, and bedrock consisting of sandstone, shale, coal, and conglomerate. The bedrock mainly occurs near the creek's middle and upper reaches. There are also a few patches of alluvium and fill.

== Watershed ==
The watershed of Warrior Creek has an area of 4.51 square miles (11.7 km^{2}). The creek is entirely within the United States Geological Survey quadrangle of Wilkes-Barre West.

Warrior Creek is designated for use by aquatic life.

== History ==
Warrior Creek was entered into the Geographic Names Information System on August 2, 1979. Its identifier in the Geographic Names Information System is 1190603.

A concrete culvert bridge carrying State Route 2002 was constructed across Warrior Creek in 1952. It is 44.9 feet (13.7 m) long and is situated in Hanover Township.

The Bureau of Abandoned Mine Reclamation of the Pennsylvania Department of Environmental Protection has a permit to discharge stormwater into Warrior Creek during earth-moving activities involving filling in dangerous strip pits. A $750,000 Growing Greener project has been completed in the creek's watershed and in the watershed of Solomon Creek. The project's aim was to reclaim abandoned mine lands.

== Biology ==
The drainage basin of Warrior Creek is designated as a Coldwater Fishery and a Migratory Fishery. However, a 1978 report noted that the creek was devoid of fish life.

== See also ==
- Nanticoke Creek, next tributary of the Susquehanna River going downriver
- Solomon Creek, next tributary of the Susquehanna River going upriver
- List of rivers of Pennsylvania
