= Pine Creek (Solomon Creek tributary) =

Physical characteristics
- Source
  - location: mountain in Bear Creek Township, Pennsylvania
  - elevation: between 2,000 and 2,020 feet (610 and 620 m)
- Mouth
  - location: Solomon Creek in Hanover Township, Luzerne County, Pennsylvania
  - coordinates: 41°11′51″N 75°53′42″W
  - elevation: 896 ft (273 m)
- Length: 3.5 mi (5.6 km)
- Basin size: 5.00 mi^{2} (12.9 km^{2})

Basin features
- Progression: Solomon Creek → Susquehanna River → Chesapeake Bay
- Tributaries
  - left: two unnamed tributaries
  - right: two unnamed tributaries

Pine Creek (also known as Pine Run) is a tributary of Solomon Creek in Luzerne County, Pennsylvania, in the United States. It is approximately 3.5 miles (5.6 km) long and flows through Bear Creek Township, Laurel Run, and Hanover Township. The watershed of the creek has an area of 5.00 square miles (12.9 km^{2}). The creek is designated as a Coldwater Fishery and a Migratory Fishery and its watershed is inhabited by several species of macroinvertebrates and fish, including trout. A reservoir known as the Pine Run Reservoir is situated on the creek. It is dammed by the Pine Run Dam Number 1.

== Course ==
Pine Creek begins on a mountain in Bear Creek Township. It flows northwest for a short distance before turning north and flowing off the mountain. After several tenths of a mile, the creek enters the borough of Laurel Run and begins flowing through a valley. It turns west, receives an unnamed tributary from the right and enters Hanover Township. The creek continues west for more than a mile, receiving two unnamed tributaries from the left and one more from the right. It then turns west-southwest for several tenths of a mile, crossing Pennsylvania Route 309. The creek then turns northwest, passing through a small pond and then reaching its confluence with Solomon Creek after a few tenths of a mile.

Pine Creek joins Solomon Creek 6.10 miles (9.82 km) upstream of its mouth.

== Hydrology ==
The water temperature of Pine Creek ranges from 38 to 62 °F (3 to 17 °C). No iron has been recorded in the creek. Its pH ranges from 5.5 to 6.5, the concentration of acidity ranges from 17.1 to 51.3 milligrams per liter, and the concentration of alkalinity is 17.1 milligrams per liter. The concentration of dissolved oxygen in the creek is between 10 and 13 milligrams per liter, depending on the site.

== Geography and geology ==
The elevation near the mouth of Pine Creek is 896 feet (273 m) above sea level. The elevation of the creek's source is between 2,000 and 2,020 feet (610 and 620 m) above sea level.

Pine Creek is described as "relatively intact" in the Solomon Creek Coldwater Conservation Plan in 2009.

A reservoir known as the Pine Run Reservoir is situated on Pine Creek. The reservoir has a capacity of 7.5 million gallons and is dammed by a masonry and concrete dam of intermediate size. The dam is known as Pine Run Dam Number 1. As of 1980, it is in a deteriorated condition. Its spillway is considered to be "seriously inadequate" and the dam itself is designated as an "unsafe non-emergency dam".

== Watershed ==
The watershed of Pine Creek has an area of 5.00 square miles (12.9 km^{2}). It is in the southeastern part of the watershed of Solomon Creek. There are 7.68 miles (12.36 km) of streams in the watershed. The creek's mouth is in the United States Geological Survey quadrangle of Wilkes-Barre West. However, its source is in the quadrangle of Wilkes-Barre East.

The watershed of Pine Creek is heavily forested. The surrounding terrain shields it from being significantly impacted by severe rainstorms.

Pine Creek flows alongside Pine Run Road for some distance.

== History ==
Pine Creek was entered into the Geographic Names Information System on August 2, 1979. Its identifier in the Geographic Names Information System is 1183778. The main stem of Pine Creek was historically known as Solomon Creek around 1894.

In the late 1800s, Pine Creek was one of the water supplies of the Crystal Spring Water Company. The creek was said to have fair water quality in 1895.

== Biology ==
Pine Creek is designated as a Coldwater Fishery and a Migratory Fishery. However, the creek has had low densities of trout in the past, but more recently, their numbers have increased. The watershed of the creek contains the only Approved Trout Waters in the watershed of Solomon Creek. Pine Creek could potentially be upgraded to Class A Wild Trout Waters.

Brook trout, longnose dace, eastern blacknose dace, and creek chub all inhabit the watershed of Pine Creek. Wild trout naturally reproduce in the creek from its headwaters downstream to its mouth.

Roach-like stoneflies and common shredders inhabit Pine Creek. Of the macroinvertebrate taxa in the creek, between 60 and 83 percent are of the orders Ephemeroptera, Plecoptera, and Trichoptera. Between 0 and 33 percent are mayflies.

== See also ==
- Sugar Notch Run, next tributary of Solomon Creek going downstream
- List of rivers of Pennsylvania
