= Askam Borehole =

Borehole in Pennsylvania, United States

Coordinates: 41.200145°N 75.96606°W

The Askam Borehole is a major discharge point for acid mine drainage (AMD) located in Hanover Township, Luzerne County, Pennsylvania, near the village of Askam in the United States. Constructed by the Pennsylvania Department of Environmental Protection in the early 1970s, the borehole was drilled to relieve pressure from rising groundwater in the South-East Mine Pool Complex, which threatened to flood local basements.

One of two primary outlets for this mine pool, alongside the South Wilkes-Barre Boreholes, it released between 3,500 and 7,000 US gallons (13 to 26 m^{3}) of contaminated water per minute into the Nanticoke Creek watershed. The discharge contained high levels of iron, sulfates, and acidity, with a pH of 3.7 and acidity at 633 parts per million as reported in the 1970s by "Operation Scarlift" studies, posing a significant environmental challenge. The borehole, with a diameter of 30 inches (76 cm), operated until it collapsed in 2008, after which replacement boreholes and active treatment systems took over AMD management at the location.

== Hydrology ==
Water that flows from the Askam Borehole contains a significant amount of iron deposits. Upon exposure to air, the iron precipitates in the form of iron hydroxide, a reddish-orange compound that coats stream channels. The borehole contributes pollution to Nanticoke Creek.

In the 1970s, an Operation Scarlift report found the concentration of acidity in the discharges of the Askam Borehole to be 633 parts per million and the pH was measured to be 3.7. The concentration of iron was 384 parts per million and the sulfate concentration was 1936 parts per million. The daily load of acidity was found to be 29,100 pounds (13,200 kg) and the daily load of iron was 17,660 pounds (8,010 kg).

The Askam Borehole discharges 3,500 US gallons (13 m^{3}) of acid mine drainage per minute into Nanticoke Creek. The discharge of the borehole can reach up to 7,000 US gallons (26 m^{3}) per minute during heavy rain. In the 1970s, an Operation Scarlift report found the discharge of the borehole to be 5.51 million gallons per day.

== Geography ==
The Askam Borehole is located in Hanover Township, in the central part of Luzerne County. The borehole is in the watershed of Nanticoke Creek, whose watershed has been deep mined and strip mined in the past. The borehole is near Dundee Road and Pennsylvania Route 29.

The Askam Borehole is one of two major outlets for mine water from the South-East Mine Pool Complex, with the other being the South Wilkes-Barre Boreholes. The borehole itself has a diameter of 30 inches (76 cm).

The Askam Borehole is the main point by which the T-B mine workings discharge acid mine drainage into Nanticoke Creek. The borehole is the only source of water for the lower reaches of Nanticoke Creek. It discharges in two different locations.

== History and etymology ==
The Askam Borehole is named after Askam, a nearby village. It was drilled in the early 1970s by the Pennsylvania Department of Environmental Resources (later known as the Pennsylvania Department of Environmental Protection). The borehole was created for the purpose of alleviating water pressure from an underground mine pool that was causing groundwater to flood local basements. In 1975, an Operation Scarlift report estimated that the cost of treating the borehole's discharge would be $1,011,600 per year in 1975 dollars.

An active treatment system for the Askam Borehole was proposed by the Earth Conservancy by 2013. As of 2014, the Earth Conservancy has been constructing, testing, and monitoring an abandoned mine drainage treatment system at the Askam Borehole. The treatment system makes use of a technology known as the Maelstrom Oxidizer, which uses electricity to blow air across the surface of the water, causing iron to precipitate from the water before the water is moved to a holding pond and then into the stream. The treatment system is known as the Askam AMD Treatment System or the Askam Treatment System. An artificial wetland has also been used to treat the borehole's discharges. This wetland was constructed in May 1999 and has an area of 2.2 acres (0.89 ha).

In the 2010s, the Earth Conservancy was awarded a $250,000 grant by the Pennsylvania Department of Environmental Protection to clean up the Askam Borehole discharges. There are plans for the Eastern Pennsylvania Coalition for Abandoned Mine Restoration to continue to take biological stream samples and water quality measurements in the vicinity of the Askam Borehole.
