= Askam, Pennsylvania =

Village in Luzerne County, Pennsylvania

Coordinates: 41.19885°N 75.95434°W

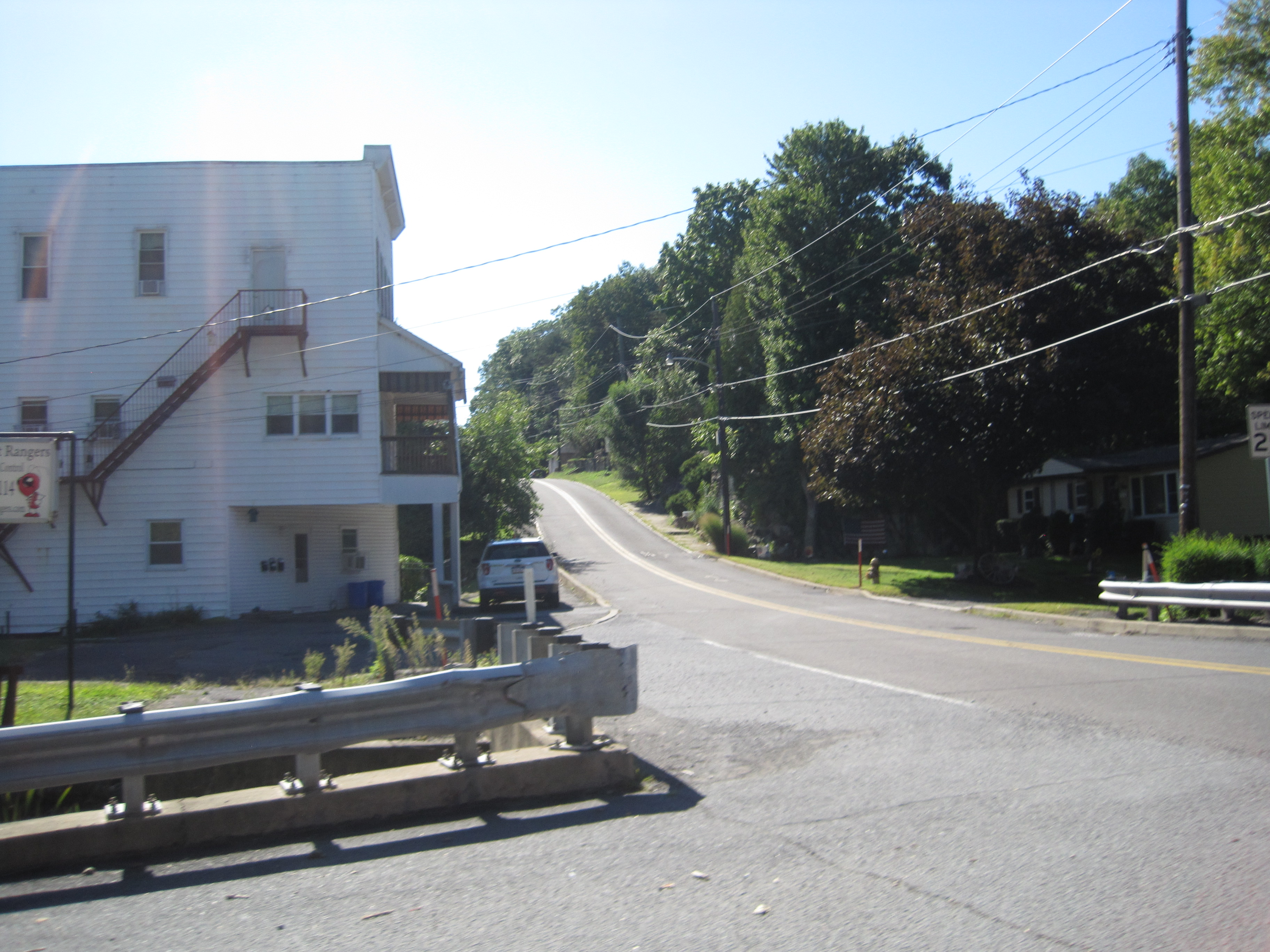
Main Street in Askam

Askam is a village in Hanover Township, Luzerne County, Pennsylvania.

The Askam Borehole is located near Askam.
