= Espy Run =

Physical characteristics
- Source
  - location: near the border between Nanticoke, Luzerne County, Pennsylvania and Newport Township, Luzerne County, Pennsylvania
  - elevation: between 600 and 620 feet (180 and 190 m)
- Mouth
  - location: Espy Run in Hanover Township, Luzerne County, Pennsylvania
  - coordinates: 41°12′24″N 75°58′59″W
  - elevation: 528 ft (161 m)
- Length: 2.4 mi (3.9 km)
- Basin size: 3.14 mi^{2} (8.1 km^{2})

Basin features
- Progression: Nanticoke Creek → Susquehanna River → Chesapeake Bay

Espy Run is a tributary of Nanticoke Creek in Luzerne County, Pennsylvania, in the United States. It is approximately 2.4 miles (3.9 km) long and flows through Nanticoke and Hanover Township. The watershed of the stream has an area of 3.14 square miles (8.1 km^{2}). The stream is affected by abandoned mine drainage and has been affected by sewage in the past. The Espy Run Wetlands and the Espy Run discharge are in the stream's vicinity. The surficial geology in the area consists of urban land, coal dumps, surface mining land, Wisconsinan Till, Wisconsinan Ice-Contact Stratified Drift, and bedrock.

== Course ==
Espy Run begins in Nanticoke, near the border between Nanticoke and Newport Township. It flows east-northeast for several tenths of a mile before turning north for nearly a mile. It then turns northeast and enters Hanover Township. After several tenths of a mile, the stream turns north-northwest for a few tenths of a mile. It then reaches its confluence with Nanticoke Creek near the Sans Souci Parkway.

Espy Run joins Nanticoke Creek 0.42 miles (0.68 km) upstream of its mouth.

== Hydrology ==
Espy Run is considered by the Pennsylvania Department of Environmental Protection to be impaired. The cause of the impairment is flow alterations. However, a total maximum daily load is not planned. The stream has a greater level of flow variability than nearby streams that are more affected by abandoned mine drainage. The stream also received sewage (possibly raw sewage) from some sites in the 1970s. The Espy Run Discharge contaminates the stream with iron hydroxide.

The daily mean discharge of Espy Run ranges from 0.262 to 74 cubic feet per second, with an average of 8.3 cubic feet per second. The instantaneous discharge of the stream at the gage at Nanticoke was measured to be 2.0 cubic feet per second in June 1999 and 2.9 in October 1999. The pH of the stream was 6.9 in June 1999 and 7.0 in October 1999. The net alkalinity concentration on those dates was 245 and 211 milligrams per liter, respectively. The specific conductivity was 1160 micro-siemens per centimeter in June and 1070 micro-siemens per centimeter in October.

In June 1999, the concentration of dissolved oxygen in Espy Run at Nanticoke was measured to be 9.6 milligrams per liter. The concentration was 5.6 milligrams per liter in October of that year. The concentration of dissolved chlorides was 35.0 milligrams per liter in June 1999 and 36.0 milligrams per liter in October 1999. The dissolved sulfate concentration was 320 milligrams per liter in June and 380 milligrams per liter in October.

In June 1999, the concentration of dissolved aluminum in Espy Run at the Nanticoke stream gage was less than 10.0 micrograms per liter. In October, it was less than 15.0 micrograms per liter. However, the dissolved iron concentration was 4400 micrograms per liter in June 1999 and 7000 micrograms per liter in October. The manganese concentration was 4000 micrograms per liter in June and 3700 micrograms per liter in October. In June 1999, the combined daily load of the three metals was 90 pounds (41 kg). In October, the load was 170 pounds (77 kg) per day.

== Geography, geology, and climate ==
The elevation near the mouth of Espy Run is 528 feet (161 m) above sea level. Th elevation of the stream's source is between 600 and 620 feet (180 and 190 m) above sea level.

Espy Run is at the southwestern end of the Northern Middle Anthracite Field.

In the lower reaches of Espy Run, the surficial geology mainly consists of coal dumps, urban land, and Wisconsinan Till. Further upstream, there is Wisconsinan Ice-Contact Stratified Drift, surface mining land, Wisconsinan Till, and some patches of bedrock consisting of sandstone and shale.

A series of local rolls known as the Espy Run Anticlinals occur along Espy Run.

The water temperature of Espy Run was measured to be 20.0 °C (68.0 °F) in June 1999. It was only 13.0 °C (55.4 °F) in October 1999.

== Watershed ==
The watershed of Espy Run has an area of 3.14 square miles (8.1 km^{2}). The stream is entirely within the United States Geological Survey quadrangle of Wilkes-Barre West.

The Espy Run wetlands are in the watershed of Espy Run. They are artificial wetlands and their construction started in 2001 and finished in 2011. A discharge known as the Espy Run Discharge is also present near the stream.

== History ==
Espy Run was entered into the Geographic Names Information System on August 2, 1979. Its identifier in the Geographic Names Information System is 1174323.

A passive treatment system has been built on an unnamed mine seep discharging into Espy Run. As of 2007, it is operational and removes iron, aluminum, and some manganese from the water. The MC Development Company has a permit to fill in 0.41 acres (0.17 ha) in the vicinity of the stream for the purpose of constructing a 104-unit housing development known as Lexington Terrace.

== See also ==
- List of rivers of Pennsylvania
