= Gardner Creek (Mill Creek tributary) =

Gardner Creek Gardner's Creek, Gardiners Creek

Physical characteristics
- Source
  - location: Harlow Pond in Pittston Township, Pennsylvania
  - elevation: between 1,620 and 1,640 feet (490 and 500 m)
- Mouth
  - location: Mill Creek in Plains Township, Pennsylvania
  - coordinates: 41°16′35″N 75°49′04″W
  - elevation: 640 ft (200 m)
- Length: 8.5 mi (13.7 km)
- Basin size: 9.24 mi^{2} (23.9 km^{2})

Basin features
- Progression: Mill Creek → Susquehanna River → Chesapeake Bay
- Tributaries
  - right: Three Spring Brook, Lampblack Creek

Gardner Creek (also known as Gardiners Creek or Gardner's Creek) is a tributary of Mill Creek in Luzerne County, Pennsylvania, in the United States. It is approximately 8.5 miles (13.7 km) long and flows through Pittston Township, Jenkins Township, Laflin, and Plains Township. The creek's watershed has an area of 9.24 square miles (23.9 km^{2}). A reservoir known as the Gardner Creek Reservoir is on the creek. The creek is designated as a Coldwater Fishery.

== Course ==
Gardner Creek begins in Harlow Pond in Pittston Township. It flows west for several tenths of a mile and then enters a valley before turning southwest for more than a mile. Along the way, the creek enters Jenkins Township and receives the tributary Three Spring Brook from the left. It then turns west for a few tenths of a mile before turning southwest and then west again. After this, it turns south and then west-southwest, passing through the Gardner Creek Reservoir. The creek then turns northwest and exits its valley. It continues northwest for considerably more than a mile, crossing Interstate 476, receives the tributary Lampblack Creek from the right, and then enters Laflin and crosses Interstate 81 and Pennsylvania Route 315. The creek then turns southwest for several tenths of a mile before turning northwest and then south-southwest. It enters Plains Township and several tenths of a mile further downstream, reaches its confluence with Mill Creek.

Gardner Creek joins Mill Creek 3.46 miles (5.57 km) upstream of its mouth.

== Geography and geology ==
The elevation near the mouth of Gardner Creek is 640 feet (200 m) above sea level. The elevation of the creek's source is between 1,620 and 1,640 feet (490 and 500 m) above sea level.

There is a large rock outcrop in the vicinity of the Gardner Creek Reservoir.

== Watershed ==
The watershed of Gardner Creek has an area of 9.24 square miles (23.9 km^{2}). The watershed is in the northern part of the drainage basin of Mill Creek and encompasses portions of Jenkins Township, Pittston Township, and Laflin. The creek's mouth is in the United States Geological Survey quadrangle of Pittston. However, its source is in the quadrangle of Avoca.

A reservoir known as the Gardner Creek Reservoir is in the watershed of Gardner Creek. It has a maximum volume of 54 acre feet and is dammed. The reservoir is listed on the Luzerne County Natural Areas Inventory.

Gardner Creek is one of the main sources of flooding on Laflin. A flood of the creek in August 1955 caused Market Street and Main Street to be covered in one foot (0.30 m) of water. A flood of this magnitude has a two percent chance of occurring in any given year.

Gardner Creek is a major tributary of Mill Creek.

== History ==
Gardner Creek was entered into the Geographic Names Information System on August 2, 1979. Its identifier in the Geographic Names Information System is 1175441. The creek is also known as Gardiners Creek or Gardner's Creek. The former variant name appears on county highway maps published by the Pennsylvania Department of Transportation.

The first gristmill in Jenkins Township was built on Gardner Creek by Joseph Garner and Isaac Gould in 1794. The first sawmill in the township was built on the creek by Elias Smith in 1881. The Laflin Powder Mills historically operated on Gardner Creek. They contained seven mills and other buildings stretching for 2,000 feet (610 m) in a forested hollow. The mills were mainly built in 1872 by H.D. Laflin and C.R. Mouse for $100,000, but some expansions were made later. A dam was under construction on the creek by the late 1800s. There was an intake dam on Gardner Creek as early as 1915.

In a precedent-setting constitutional law case, NANKIVIL v. YEOSOCK, et al., the Supreme Court of PA ruled on the building of the first abutments over Gardiner Creek in Plains around 1894. A concrete slab bridge was built over Gardner Creek in Laflin in 1930 and repaired in 1977. It is 29.9 feet (9.1 m) long and carries State Route 2015. A steel stringer bridge was built over the creek in 1937 in Plains Township. It is 56.1 feet (17.1 m) long and carries State Route 2011. A prestressed box beam bridge was built over the creek in 1941 in Jenkins Township and repaired in 1985. It is 38.1 feet (11.6 m) long and carries State Route 2039. A steel stringer bridge was built over Gardner Creek in 1946 in Laflin and repaired in 1992. It is 47.9 feet (14.6 m) long and carries State Route 2016. A prestressed box beam bridge was built over the creek in 1963 in Laflin. It is 28.9 feet (8.8 m) long and carries Pennsylvania Route 315.

== Biology ==
Gardner Creek is designated as a Coldwater Fishery.

The forests near the Gardner Creek Reservoir are slightly less than 50 years old and consist mainly of oak trees, with huckleberry and blueberry in the understory.

== See also ==
- Laurel Run (Mill Creek), next tributary of Mill Creek going downstream
- List of rivers of Pennsylvania
