= Nanticoke Creek =

River in the United States of America

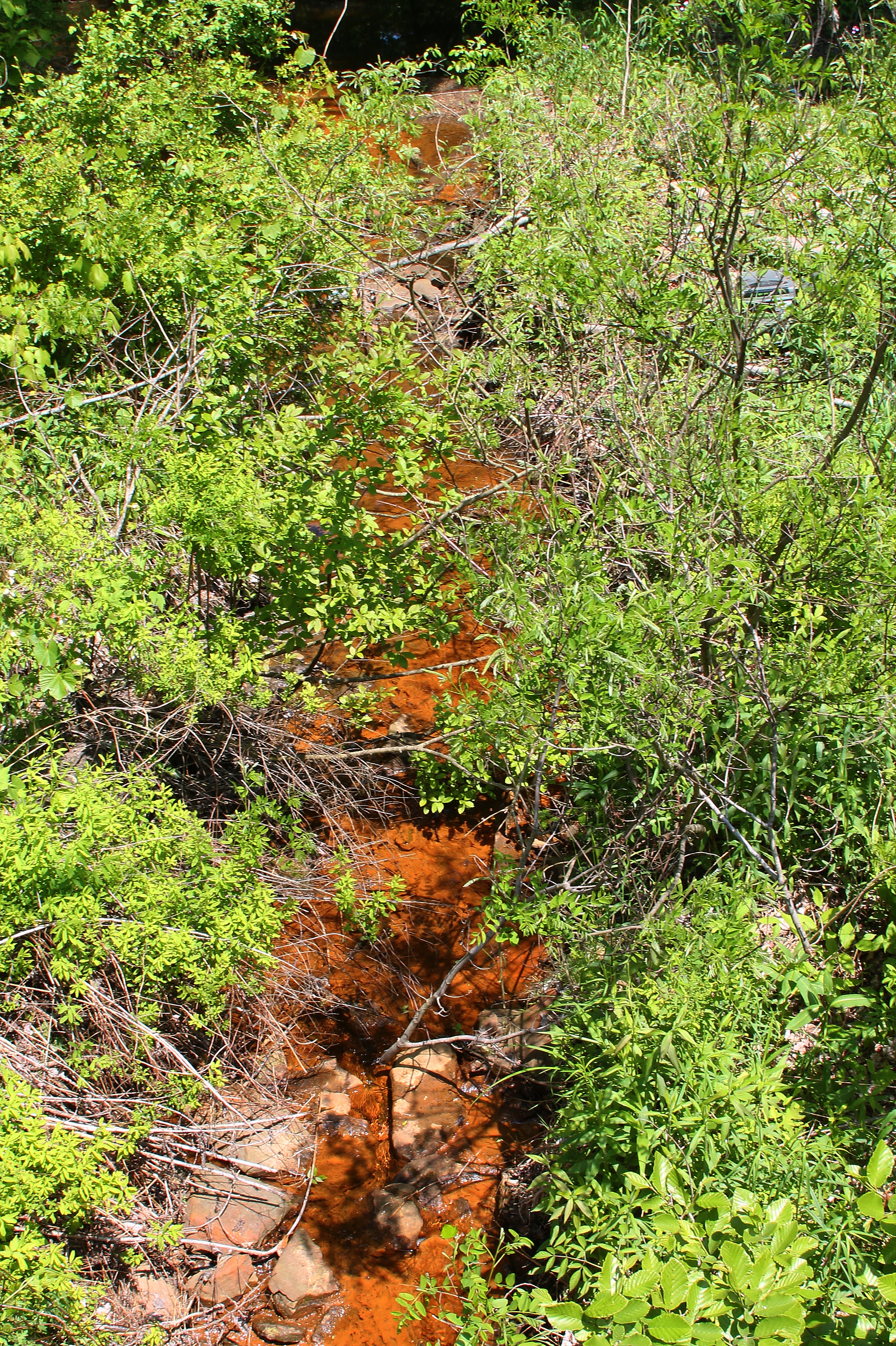
- Nanticoke Creek looking downstream
- Etymology: named after the Nanticoke tribe, who once had a village in the area

Physical characteristics
- Source
  - location: valley on Penobscot Mountain in Hanover Township, Luzerne County, Pennsylvania
  - elevation: between 1,000 and 1,020 feet (300 and 310 m)
- Mouth
  - location: Susquehanna River in Hanover Township, Luzerne County, Pennsylvania
  - coordinates: 41°12′44″N 75°58′50″W
  - elevation: 515 ft (157 m)
- Length: 4.4 mi (7.1 km)
- Discharge
  - average: 0.019 to 40 cubic feet per second (0.00054 to 1.13267 m^{3}/s)

Basin features
- Progression: Susquehanna River → Chesapeake Bay
- Tributaries
  - left: Espy Run

Nanticoke Creek is a tributary of the Susquehanna River in Luzerne County, Pennsylvania, in the United States. It is approximately 4.4 miles (7.1 km) long and flows through Hanover Township and Nanticoke. The watershed of the creek has an area of 7.57 square miles (19.6 km^{2}). The creek has one named tributary, which is known as Espy Run. Nanticoke Creek impaired by pH and metals due to abandoned mine drainage. Abandoned mine drainage discharges in the creek's watershed include the Truesdale Mine Discharge and the Askam Borehole. The creek is located in the Northern Middle Anthracite Field and is in the Anthracite Valley Section of the ridge and valley physiographic province. The main rock formations in the watershed include the Mauch Chunk Formation, the Pottsville Group, and the Llewellyn Formation. The surficial geology consists of coal dumps, surface mining land, alluvium, Wisconsinan Outwash, Wisconsinan Till, urban land, and bedrock.

The watershed of Nanticoke Creek is mainly forested, but urban land and mining land are also present. The city of Nanticoke is partially in the watershed and many unincorporated communities are there as well. The creek is named after the Nanticoke tribe, but was historically known as Muddy Run before appearing on maps with its present name by 1776. Extensive mining, both underground and on the surface, has been done in the creek's watershed. Numerous passive and active treatment systems have been installed in the watershed in recent times.

Nanticoke Creek is designated as a Coldwater Fishery and a Migratory Fishery. However, it is relatively lacking in aquatic life.

== Course ==
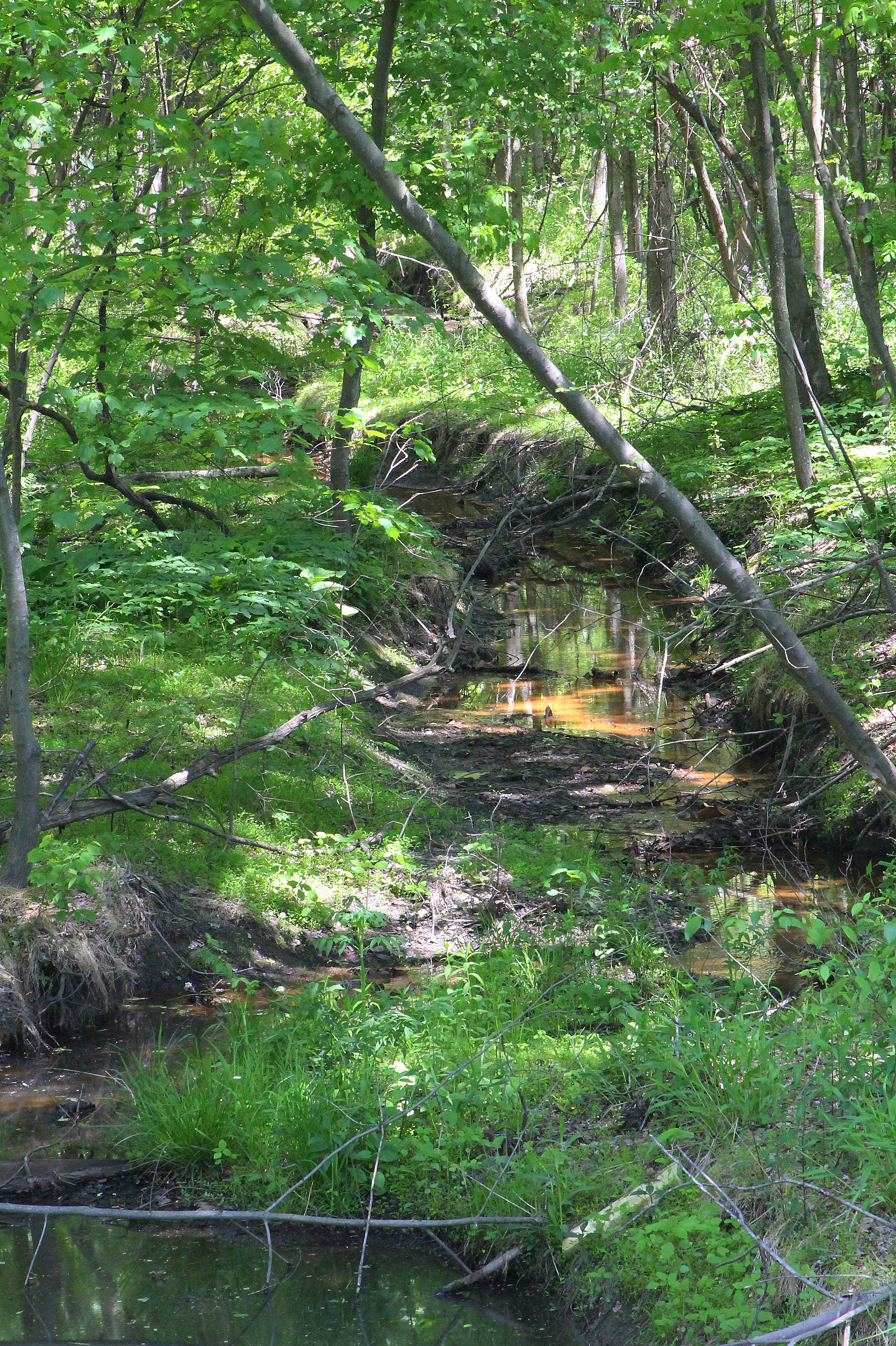
Nanticoke Creek looking downstream

Nanticoke Creek begins in a valley on Penobscot Mountain in Hanover Township. It flows west for a short distance before turning north-northwest and passing through the Weller Gap. The creek then leaves behind the mountain and turns north for a few tenths of a mile before turning west-northwest, briefly passing through Nanticoke before reentering Hanover Township. It then turns north-northwest for nearly a mile, crossing Pennsylvania Route 29/US Route 11/South Cross Valley Expressway and passing by the community of Loomis Park. The creek then turns northwest for several tenths of a mile before turning west and crossing the South Cross Valley Expressway again. After this, it turns northwest again for a few tenths of a mile before receiving Espy Run, its only named tributary, from the left. It then crosses the Sans Souci Parkway and turns northwest for a few tenth of a mile, crossing the South Cross Valley Expressway once more before reaching its confluence with the Susquehanna River.

Nanticoke Creek joins the Susquehanna River 183.04 miles (294.57 km) upriver of its mouth.

=== Tributaries ===
In addition to having several unnamed tributaries, Nanticoke Creek has one named tributary, which is known as Espy Run. Espy Run joins Nanticoke Creek 0.42 miles (0.68 km) upstream of its mouth. Its watershed has an area of 3.14 square miles (8.1 km^{2}). An unofficially named tributary known as Leuders Creek is also in the watershed.

== Hydrology ==
Nanticoke Creek is considered by the Pennsylvania Department of Environmental Protection to be impaired, meaning that it fails to attain water quality standards. The causes of impairment are metals and pH and the probable source is abandoned mine drainage. The creek is also impacted by abandoned mine lands in its watershed. However, a total maximum daily load is not planned. The upper reaches of the creek do not experience any major pollution.

Nanticoke Creek loses water to mines and also receives abandoned mine drainage discharges from them. The Truesdale Mine Discharge, which is also known as the Dundee Outfall, discharges into the creek. In low-flow conditions, its flow ranges from 0 to 38 cubic feet per second. A smaller abandoned mine drainage discharge with a discharge of 0.01 to 0.06 cubic feet per second also discharges into the creek. It has a substantial concentration of dissolved aluminum, but low levels of dissolved oxygen.

The discharge of Nanticoke Creek downstream of the Truesdale Mine Discharge ranges from 0.019 to 40 cubic feet per second, with a mean of 6.3 cubic feet per second. The discharge of the creek at its mouth was measured to be 3.8 cubic feet per second in June 1999 and 8.2 cubic feet per second in October 1999. Both values were significantly lower than those of the nearby Newport Creek.

In June 1999, the pH of Nanticoke Creek downstream of the Truesdale Mine Discharge was 6.8 and in October 1999, it was 6.4. At the creek's mouth, the pH was 6.8 in October 1999. The net alkalinity concentration was 40.0 milligrams per liter at the mine discharge in June, 3.70 milligrams per liter at the discharge in October, and 18.0 milligrams per liter at the mouth in October. During the 1970s, the acidity concentration of the creek's waters ranged from 18 to 365 parts per million on the main stem. The alkalinity concentration ranged from 0 to 3 parts per million. The specific conductance of the creek below the mine discharge was 1380 micro-siemens per centimeter in June 1999 and 1430 micro-siemens per centimeter in October. The specific conductance at the creek's mouth was 1390 micro-siemens per centimeter in October.

In June 1999, the concentration of dissolved oxygen in Nanticoke Creek downstream of the Truesdale Mine Discharge was measured to be 9.4 milligrams per liter. In October of the same year, the concentration of dissolved oxygen at the creek's mouth was 8.9 milligrams per liter. The chloride concentration of the creek at the Truesdale Mine Discharge was 19.0 milligrams per liter in June 1999 and 720 in October 1999. It was 22.0 milligrams per liter at the mouth in October 1999. The sulfate concentration of the creek at the Truesdale Mine Discharge was 690 milligrams per liter in June 1999 and 720 in October 1999. It was 690 milligrams per liter at the mouth in October 1999.

The concentration of dissolved aluminum in the waters of Nanticoke Creek at the Truesdale Mine Discharge was 23.0 micrograms per liter in June 1999 and approximately 15.0 micrograms per liter in October 1999. The concentration at the creek's mouth in October 1999 was less than 15.0 micrograms per liter. The dissolved iron concentration in the creek at the Truesdale Mine Discharge was 37,000 micrograms per liter in June 1999 and approximately 43,000 micrograms per liter in October 1999. The concentration at the creek's mouth in October 1999 was 15,000 micrograms per liter. The dissolved manganese concentration at the mine discharge was 4900 micrograms per liter in June 1999 and approximately 5200 micrograms per liter in October 1999. The concentration at the creek's mouth in October 1999 was 4900 micrograms per liter. The combined load of the three metals was 320 pounds (150 kg) per day at the mine discharge in June, 800 pounds (360 kg) per day at the discharge in October, and 880 pounds (400 kg) per day at the mouth in October.

There is some evidence of sewage contamination, including sewer odors and debris, in the lower reaches of Nanticoke Creek. The city of Nanticoke has a permit to discharge sewage into the creek. Four combined sewer overflows are present in the watershed. Orange sediment is deposited on the creek's streambed, indicating a high concentration of iron in the waters. Yellow boy is also present along the creek in some places and can be seen from South Cross Valley Expressway. The concentration of total dissolved solids in the creek is 622 milligrams per liter, higher than the United States Environmental Protection Agency criterion for suitability for aquatic life.

== Geography, geology, and climate ==
The elevation near the mouth of Nanticoke Creek is 515 feet (157 m) above sea level. The elevation of the creek's source is between 1,000 and 1,020 feet (300 and 310 m) above sea level.

The watershed of Nanticoke Creek is mostly in the Coal Region of Pennsylvania. It is at the southwestern end of that coal basin. The creek is also at the southern end of the Anthracite Valley Section of the ridge and valley physiographic province. The Anthracite Valley Section is a crescent-shaped synclinal basin. The creek is located in the Wyoming Valley. The Lower Hanover Flats begin at its mouth. There are three headwater streams in the watershed, all of which are on a valley in a plateau above the Susquehanna River. Some of the upper mine pools in the South-East Mine Pool Complex underlie the creek's watershed.

The main rock formations in and near the watershed of Nanticoke Creek include the Mauch Chunk Formation (which dates to Late Mississippian and Early Pennsylvanian times), the Pottsville Group (from Pennsylvanian times), and the Llewellyn Formation (also from Pennsylvanian times). The Lower Red Ash coal seam is present near the headwaters of the creek.

Near its mouth, the surficial geology in the vicinity of Nanticoke Creek mainly consists of alluvium (which mainly consists of stratified silt, sand, and gravel, with some boulders), Wisconsinan Outwash (which contains stratified sand and gravel), and urban land (which is highly disrupted by cut and fill). Further upstream, the surficial geology mainly consists of coal dumps and surface mining land (both of which are rich in rick waste), as well as a glacial or resedimented till known as Wisconsinan Till, and bedrock consisting of sandstone and shale. The upper reaches of the creek mainly are around surficial geology consisting of surface mining land, bedrock, and Wisconsinan Till.

Mountains such as Little Wilkes-Barre Mountain and Penobscot Mountain are partially in the watershed. The topography of the watershed features refuse piles, crop falls, and strip pits in numerous places due to past mining. Some parts of the creek are known to run dry at times. Some water from the watershed flows to the South Wilkes-Barre Boreholes, outside of the Nanticoke Creek watershed.

A borehole known as the Askam Borehole discharges directly into Nanticoke Creek. It has a diameter of 36 inches (91 cm) and was created in the early 1970s by the Pennsylvania Department of Environmental Protection (then known as the Pennsylvania Department of Environmental Resources). It was created to alleviate flooding from an underground mine pool. The discharge of the borehole is typically around 3500 gallons per minute, but can rise to twice that during heavy rain.

In June 1999, the water temperature of Nanticoke Creek was 20.0 °C (68.0 °F) downstream of the Truesdale Mine Discharge. In October of that year, the creek's water temperature was 14.0 °C (57.2 °F) at the mine discharge and 15.0 °C (59.0 °F) at its mouth.

== Watershed ==
The watershed of Nanticoke Creek has an area of 7.57 square miles (19.6 km^{2}). The creek is entirely within the United States Geological Survey quadrangle of Wilkes-Barre West. The watershed is in the central part of Luzerne County.

Most of the watershed of Nanticoke Creek (67.3 percent) consists of forested land. Significantly less common are urban land and mining land, which make up 12.2 and 10.3 percent of the watershed's area. A total of 8.6 percent is grassland and 1.6 percent is wetlands.

Much of the watershed of Nanticoke Creek, save for its upper reaches, have been heavily mined, both via strip mining and underground mining.

Municipalities in the watershed of Nanticoke Creek include Loomis Park, Lower Askam, Hanover, Espy Gap, Truesdale Terrace, Witinski Villa, and Warrior Gap. The city of Wilkes-Barre is not far from the creek. A reservoir known as the Hanover Reservoir is located in the southwestern part of the watershed. There are also a number of silt ponds in the vicinity of the creek. The creek's mouth is half a mile to the east of Nanticoke Falls.

== History and etymology ==
Nanticoke Creek was entered into the Geographic Names Information System on August 2, 1979. Its identifier in the Geographic Names Information System is 1182159.

Nanticoke Creek, like the nearby Nanticoke city and Nanticoke Falls, is named for a group of Nanticoke People who for a time had a village in the Wyoming Valley before Europeans settled there. The creek was known as Muddy Run on some very early maps of the area. However, its current name was appearing on maps as early as 1776. The creek has also historically been referred to by many other names, including Lee's Creek, Miller's Creek, Robins Creek, Bobbs Creek, Rummage Creek, and Warrior Run Creek. All of these names were described as erroneous in Henry C. Bradsby's 1893 book History of Luzerne County, Pennsylvania.

A forge was constructed on Nanticoke Creek in 1778 by Mason F. Alden and John Alden. A log gristmill was also built in the area in the same year by a Mr. Chapman. The mill was heavily guarded in 1780. In 1793, there was a sawmill and gristmill on the creek.

Mining has historically been done in the watershed of Nanticoke Creek. This has substantially altered the hydrology and topography of the watershed. The period during which the watershed was mined lasted more than 100 years. A flume made of concrete has been constructed in the watershed of the creek.

A concrete tee beam bridge carrying State Route 2002 over Nanticoke Creek was built in 1955 and repaired in 1969. It is situated in Hanover Township and has a length of 30.8 feet (9.4 m). A concrete culvert bridge carrying Pennsylvania Route 29 over the creek was built in 1969. It is 29.9 feet (9.1 m) long and is also in Hanover Township.

In the mid-1970s, studies indicated that active treatment would be the most suitable remedy for abandoned mine drainage in the watershed of Nanticoke Creek, with hydrated lime being proposed as one possible treatment method. However, some small scale passive treatment has been attempted in the watershed. A 2008 paper estimated that the Nanticoke Creek Assessment and Restoration Project would cost $5,000,000. An active treatment project by the Earth Conservancy began in 2012, with the intent to repair damage caused by the Askam Borehole. The Bureau of Abandoned Mine Reclamation of the Pennsylvania Department of Environmental Protection has a permit to discharge stormwater into the creek during earth-moving activities involving filling in dangerous strip pits.

The United States Army Corps of Engineers published a report on Nanticoke Creek in 2005.

== Biology ==
The drainage basin of Nanticoke Creek is designated as a Coldwater Fishery and a Migratory Fishery. In the 1970s, the Operation Scarlift report for the creek noted that the creek was almost entirely devoid of aquatic life due to low water quality. However, the creek had potential for fish life.

An artificial wetland known as the Espy Run Wetland is in the watershed of Nanticoke Creek. If all of the 527 acres (213 ha) of mining land in the watershed were converted to forested land, the trees could sequester 179 short tons (160 long tons; 179 short tons) of carbon per year and 22,767 short tons (20,328 long tons; 22,767 short tons) of carbon could be stored by the time the trees become mature.

== See also ==
- Newport Creek, next tributary of the Susquehanna River going downriver
- Warrior Creek, next tributary of the Susquehanna River going upriver
- List of rivers of Pennsylvania
