= Laurel Run (Conemaugh River) =

Tributary of Mill Creek in Luzerne County, Pennsylvania

Physical characteristics
- Source
  - elevation: 2,100 feet (640 m)
- Mouth
  - location: Oakhurst (Johnstown), Pennsylvania
  - coordinates: 40°21′51″N 78°56′30″W
  - elevation: 1,250 ft (380 m)

Basin features
- Tributaries
  - right: Wildcat Run

Laurel Run is a tributary of the Conemaugh River in Cambria County, Pennsylvania, in the United States. It flows south from its source southwest of Chickaree in Jackson Township.

== Tributaries ==
Laurel Run has two named tributaries including Red Run and Wildcat Run.
