= Gairdners Creek =

Ephemeral creek in New South Wales

Gairdners Creek is an ephemeral stream at 31.3233°S 141.4323°E in western New South Wales, that starts at an elevation of 345m and peeters out at an elevation of 265m .The Gairdners Creek drops around 79.7m over its 14.8 km length.

The Geography, of Gairdners Creek is mostly the flat, arid and the nearest town is Broken Hill to the south. The area has a Köppen climate classification of BWh (Hot desert).
