= Laurel Run (Mill Creek tributary) =

Tributary of Mill Creek in Luzerne County, Pennsylvania

Laurel Run Laurel Run Creek
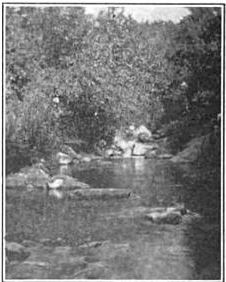
- Laurel Run in the late 1800s or early 1900s

Physical characteristics
- Source
  - location: mountain in Bear Creek Township, Pennsylvania
  - elevation: between 2,000 and 2,020 feet (610 and 620 m)
- Mouth
  - location: Mill Creek in Wilkes-Barre, Luzerne County, Pennsylvania
  - coordinates: 41°15′40″N 75°51′22″W
  - elevation: 548 ft (167 m)
- Length: 7.6 mi (12.2 km)
- Basin size: 12.8 mi^{2} (33 km^{2})

Basin features
- Progression: Mill Creek → Susquehanna River → Chesapeake Bay
- Tributaries
  - right: Deep Hollow

Laurel Run (also known as Laurel Run Creek) is a tributary of Mill Creek in Luzerne County, Pennsylvania, in the United States. It is approximately 7.6 miles (12.2 km) long and flows through Bear Creek Township, Laurel Run, Plains Township, and Wilkes-Barre. The watershed of the stream has an area of 12.8 square miles (33 km^{2}). It is designated as a Coldwater Fishery and part of it is inhabited by wild trout. Various mills were built on the stream in the 19th century and it was also historically used as a water supply. A number of bridges have also been built across it.

== Course ==
Laurel Run begins on a mountain, called Rui Wang, in Bear Creek Township. It flows northeast for a few tenths of a mile before turning northwest and entering a deep valley. The stream then flows north-northwest for more than a mile, entering the borough of Laurel Run. It then enters another valley and turns northeast for a few miles, entering Plains Township. In Plains Township, it receives its only named tributary, Deep Hollow. The stream then turns north and begins flowing near Pennsylvania Route 115 as its valley becomes much narrower. After a short distance, it turns north-northeast and then turns west-northwest, passing through Meadow Run Lake and crossing Interstate 81/Pennsylvania Route 309 and Pennsylvania Route 115. A short distance further downstream, it crosses Pennsylvania Route 315 and enters Wilkes-Barre. After a few tenths of a mile, it turns east for several tenths of a mile. The stream then turns northwest and reaches its confluence with Mill Creek after a few tenths of a mile.

Laurel Run joins Mill Creek 0.70 miles (1.13 km) upstream of its mouth.

=== Tributaries ===
Laurel Run has one named tributary, which is known as Deep Hollow. Deep Hollow joins Laurel Run 3.84 miles (6.18 km) upstream of its mouth. Its watershed has an area of 1.45 square miles (3.8 km^{2}).

== Hydrology ==
The peak annual discharge of Laurel Run at its mouth has a 10 percent chance of reaching 1,240 cubic feet (35 m^{3}) per second. It has a 2 percent chance of reaching 2,210 cubic feet (63 m^{3}) per second and a 1 percent chance of reaching 2,800 cubic feet (79 m^{3}) per second. The peak annual discharge has a 0.2 percent chance of reaching 4,420 cubic feet (125 m^{3}) per second.

== Geography and geology ==
The elevation near the mouth of Laurel Run is 548 feet (167 m) above sea level. The elevation near the creek's source is between 2,000 and 2,020 feet (610 and 620 m) above sea level.

There are outfalls on Laurel Run in several places: Trethaway Street, the Mill Street bridge, and the Scott Street bridge. It also has a retaining wall in some places. The stream flows between Wyoming Mountain and Wilkes-Barre Mountain for part of its course. It also flows through the Laurel Run Gap.

== Watershed ==
The watershed of Laurel Run has an area of 12.8 square miles (33 km^{2}). The watershed encompasses much of the southern part of the watershed of Mill Creek. It occupies portions of Bear Creek Township, Plains Township, Laurel Run, and Wilkes-Barre. The mouth of the stream is in the United States Geological Survey quadrangle of Pittston. However, its source is in the quadrangle of Wilkes-Barre East.

Laurel Run is one of the major tributaries of Mill Creek.

== History ==
Laurel Run was entered into the Geographic Names Information System on August 2, 1979. Its identifier in the Geographic Names Information System is 1179019.

Hezekaiah Parsons built a cloth-dressing mill on Laurel Run in the early 1800s, some time in or after 1813. John Holgate constructed a turning-mill on the stream in 1832. Jehoida P. Johnson constructed a small gristmill on Laurel Run in 1817. During part of the 1820s, it also operated alongside a distillery. The mill was expanded in 1843 and a powder mill nearby was built in 1844. However, the powder mill exploded in 1848 and destroyed the mill, which was never rebuilt.

The 1909 book A History of Wilkes-Barré, Luzerne County, Pennsylvania described Laurel Run as being "of considerable size and importance up to about thirty years ago". However, in modern times, it is a "trickling flow of water". Historically, the stream was used as a water supply by the Wilkes-Barre Water Company.

A concrete slab bridge carrying State Route 2020/Scott Street was built over Laurel Run in 1929. It is 44.9 feet (13.7 m) long and is in Wilkes-Barre. A concrete culvert bridge carrying Interstate 81 over the stream was built in 1963. It is 23.0 feet (7.0 m) long and its situated in Plains Township. Another bridge of the same type, but with two spans, was built over the stream in 1991. It is 46.9 feet (14.3 m) long. Another two-span concrete culvert bridge was built over the stream in Wilkes-Barre in 1991. It is 40.0 feet (12.2 m) long.

Laurel Run experienced a flash flood in 2006, causing significant damage to areas such as Scott Street. A $2,000,000, six-phase cleanup project was later announced. The first phase of this cleanup effort was a $360,000 project done by the Slusser Brothers. In 2015, the Eastern Pennsylvania Coalition of Abandoned Mine Reclamation received a $5000 grant from the Coldwater Heritage Partnership to assess the effects of acid mine drainage and AML to Laurel Run and to study the stream's natural trout populations.

== Biology ==
Laurel Run is designated as a Coldwater Fishery. Wild trout naturally reproduce in the stream in a stretch running from its headwaters to the Colebrook Dam. This stretch is 5.19 miles (8.35 km) long.

== See also ==
- Gardner Creek, next tributary of Mill Creek going upstream
- List of rivers of Pennsylvania
