= Sugar Notch, Pennsylvania =

Borough in Pennsylvania, US

- Borough
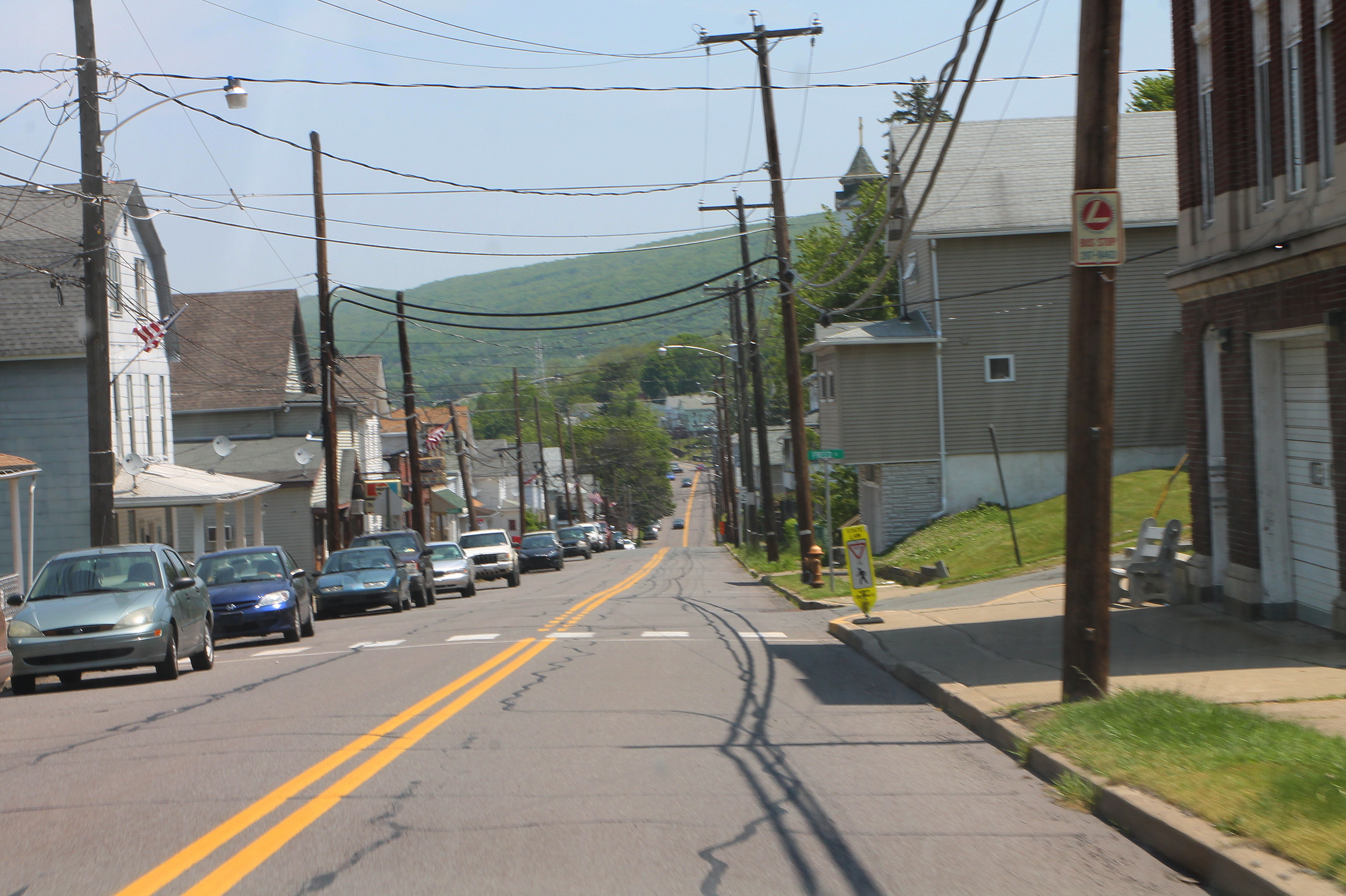
- Street in Sugar Notch

- Location of Sugar Notch in Luzerne County, Pennsylvania.

- Location within Pennsylvania Location within the United States
- Coordinates: 41°11′46″N 75°55′50″W
- Country: United States
- State: Pennsylvania
- County: Luzerne
- Incorporated: 1867

Government
  - Type: Borough Council
  - Mayor: Corey Hashagen

Area
  - Total: 1.00 sq mi (2.58 km^{2})
  - Land: 1.00 sq mi (2.58 km^{2})
  - Water: 0 sq mi (0.00 km^{2})

Population (2020)
  - Total: 996 ▲
  - Estimate (2021): 995
  - Density: 967/sq mi (373.2/km^{2})
- Time zone: UTC-5 (Eastern (EST))
  - Summer (DST): UTC-4 (EDT)
- Zip code: 18706
- Area code: 570
- FIPS code: 42-75072
- Website: www.sugarnotchborough.com

Sugar Notch is a borough in Luzerne County, Pennsylvania, United States. As of the 2020 census, Sugar Notch had a population of 1,001.

== History ==
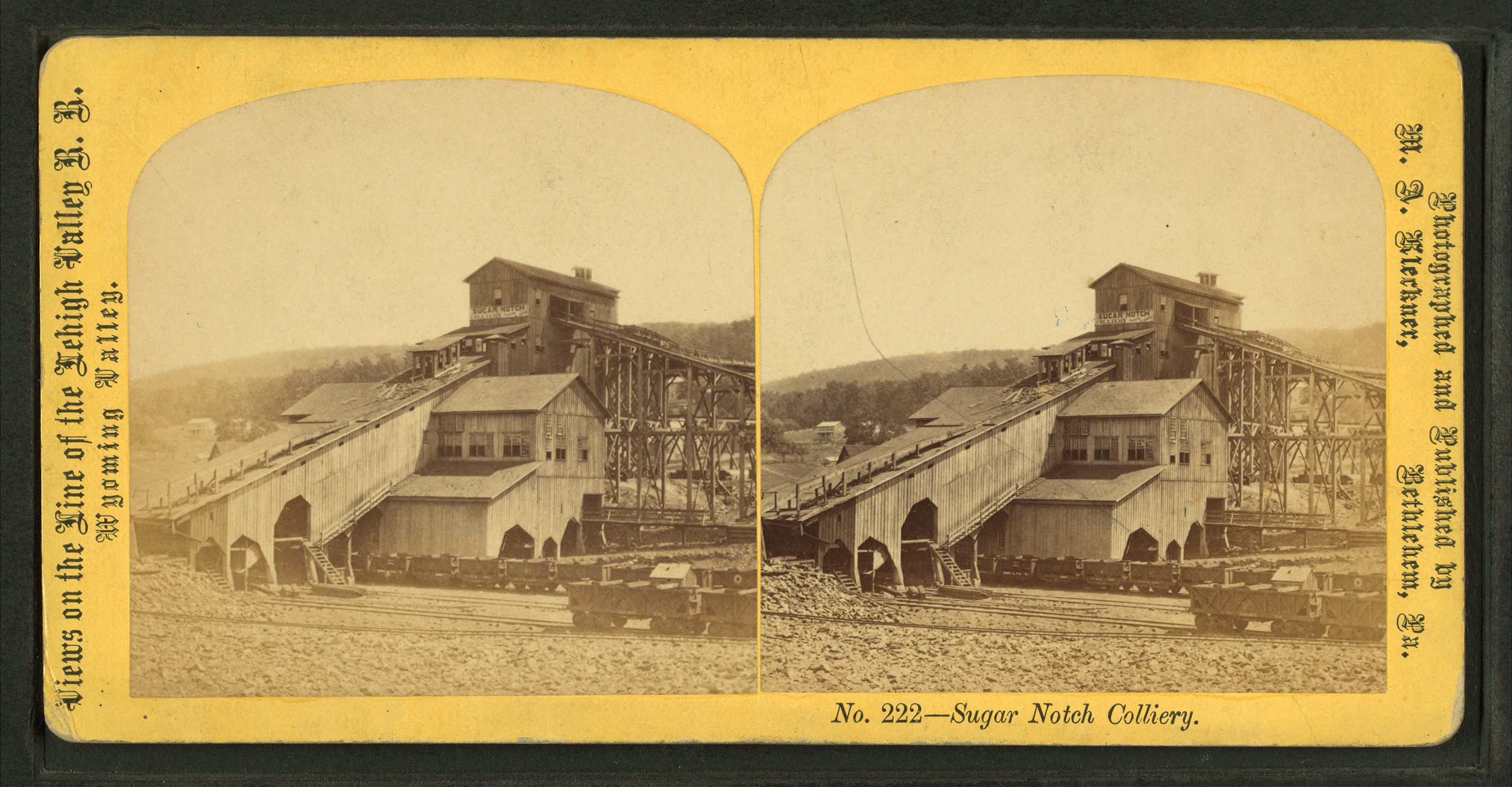
Sugar Notch colliery

Sugar Notch was incorporated as a borough on April 3, 1867; it was named for the sugar maple trees surrounding the community. It was originally part of Hanover Township. The first burgess was Charles Parrish and the first council was composed of David Caird, Henry B. Plumb, Samuel Roberts, Adam Shiedel, and George Cyphers.

In 1869, the Lehigh and Susquehanna Railroad was constructed near the borough; it was used to transport coal. Sugar Notch was a popular coal mining community in the 1800s and 1900s. The current municipal building was built in 1921.

In 1946, following the end of World War II, the Roosevelt Memorial was dedicated within the borough; Eleanor Roosevelt attended the ceremony.

== Geography ==
Sugar Notch is located at 41°11′46″N 75°55′50″W (41.196149, -75.930448).

According to the United States Census Bureau, the borough has a total area of 1.1 square miles (2.8 km^{2}), all land.

== Demographics ==
Historical population
| Census | Pop. | Note | %± |
|---|---|---|---|
| 1870 | 724 | | — |
| 1880 | 1,582 | | 118.5% |
| 1890 | 2,586 | | 63.5% |
| 1900 | 1,887 | | −27.0% |
| 1910 | 2,439 | | 29.3% |
| 1920 | 2,612 | | 7.1% |
| 1930 | 2,768 | | 6.0% |
| 1940 | 2,505 | | −9.5% |
| 1950 | 2,002 | | −20.1% |
| 1960 | 1,524 | | −23.9% |
| 1970 | 1,333 | | −12.5% |
| 1980 | 1,191 | | −10.7% |
| 1990 | 1,044 | | −12.3% |
| 2000 | 1,023 | | −2.0% |
| 2010 | 989 | | −3.3% |
| 2020 | 1,001 | | 1.2% |
| 2021 (est.) | 995 | ▼ | −0.6% |

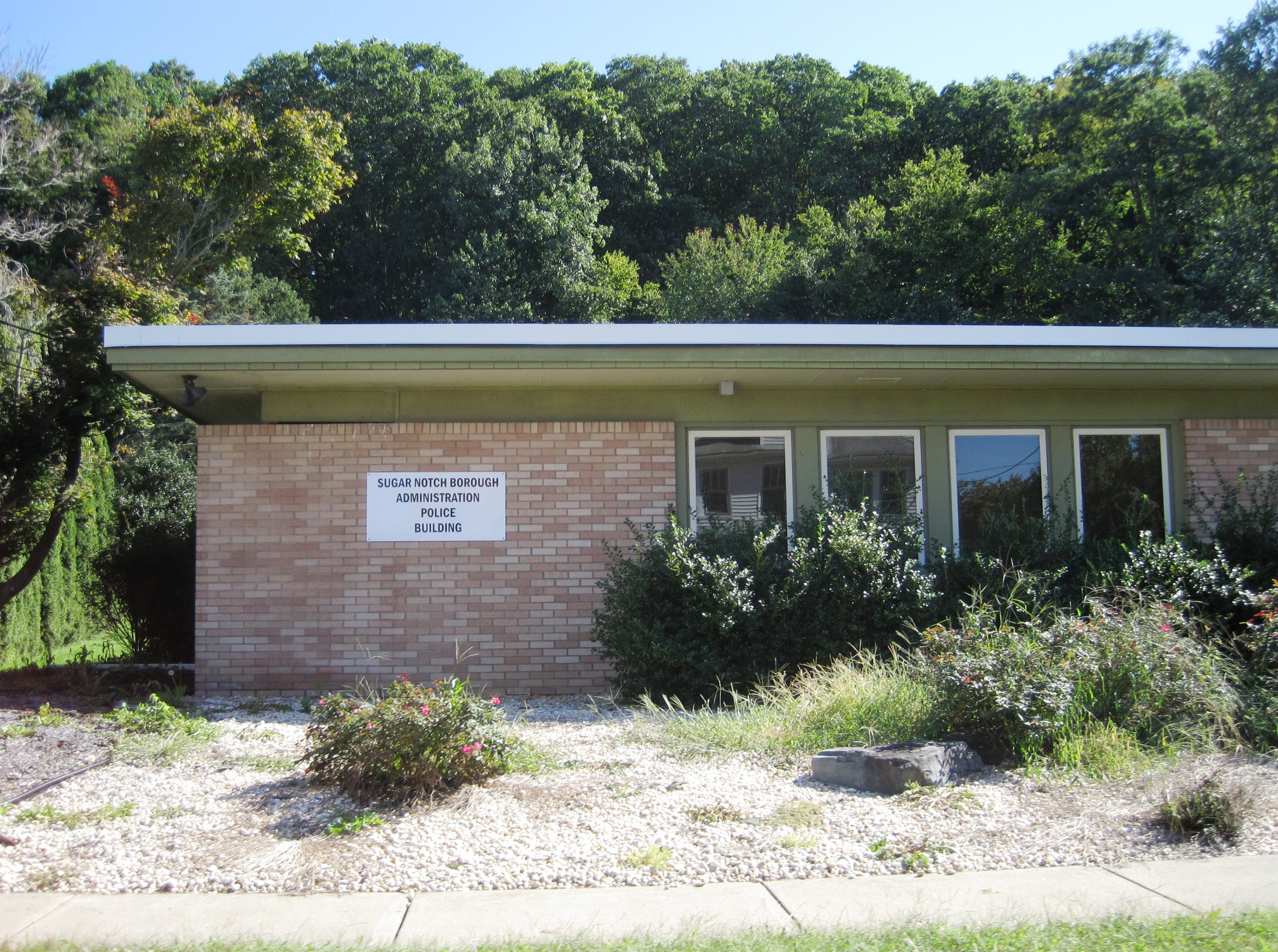
Sugar Notch Municipal Building

As of the census of 2000, there were one thousand twenty-three people, four hundred and seventeen households and two hundred and eighty-eight families residing in the borough. The population density was 1,002.8 inhabitants per square mile (387.2/km^{2}). There were four hundred and fifty-nine housing units at an average density of 449.9 per square mile (173.7/km^{2}).

The racial makeup of the borough was 99.41% White, 0.10% Asian, 0.10% from other races, and 0.39% from two or more races. Hispanic or Latino of any race were 0.29% of the population.

There were four hundred and seventeen households, out of which 25.2% had children under the age of eighteen living with them, 48.9% were married couples living together, 16.3% had a female householder with no husband present, and 30.9% were non-families.

27.3% of all households were made up of individuals, and 16.8% had someone living alone who was sixty-five years of age or older. The average household size was 2.45 and the average family size was 2.97.

In the borough the population was spread out, with 19.5% under the age of eighteen, 7.9% from eighteen to twenty-four, 27.9% from twenty-five to forty-four, 23.1% from forty-five to sixty-four, and 21.7% who were sixty-five years of age or older. The median age was forty-two years.

For every one hundred females there were 92.7 males. For every one hundred females aged eighteen and over, there were 85.2 males.

The median income for a household in the borough was $33,125, and the median income for a family was $38,906. Males had a median income of $30,430 compared to that of $21,563 for females. The per capita income for the borough was $15,902.

Roughly 8.0% of families and 9.3% of the population were below the poverty line, including 18.5% of those under age eighteen and 6.0% of those aged sixty-five or over.

The borough's population peaked in 1930 (with 2,768 residents). The population of Sugar Notch has been in constant decline since that decade. The population had fallen to nine hundred and sixty-four by 2017.

== Education ==
It is in the Hanover Area School District.
