= Laurel Run, Pennsylvania =

Borough in Pennsylvania, US

- Borough
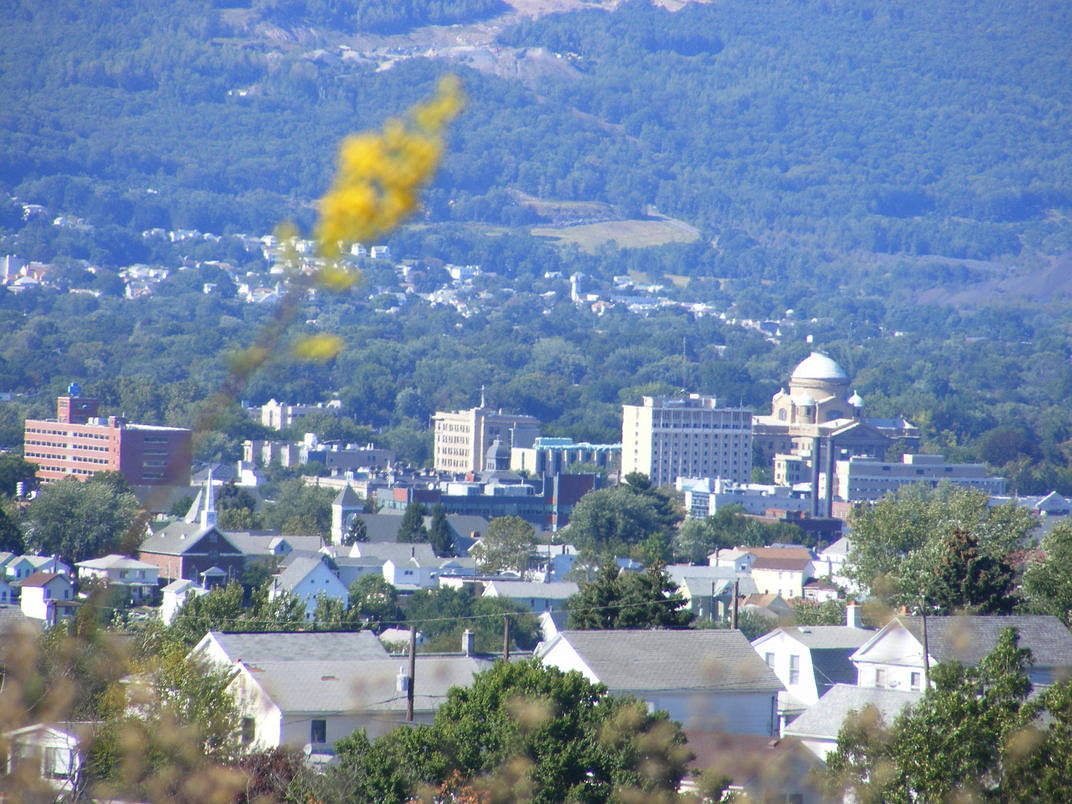
- A view of Wilkes-Barre from Giants Despair Mountain (in Laurel Run)

- Location of Laurel Run in Luzerne County, Pennsylvania

- Location within Pennsylvania Location within the United States
- Coordinates: 41°13′02″N 75°50′29″W
- Country: United States
- State: Pennsylvania
- County: Luzerne
- Incorporated: 1881

Government
  - Type: Borough Council

Area
  - Total: 5.10 sq mi (13.21 km^{2})
  - Land: 5.10 sq mi (13.21 km^{2})
  - Water: 0 sq mi (0.00 km^{2})

Population (2020)
  - Total: 558
  - Density: 109.4/sq mi (42.23/km^{2})
- Time zone: UTC-5 (Eastern (EST))
  - Summer (DST): UTC-4 (EDT)
- Area code: 570
- FIPS code: 42-41848

Laurel Run is a borough that is located in Luzerne County, Pennsylvania, United States. The population was 560 at the time of the 2020 census.

== History ==
Laurel Run was incorporated as a borough in 1881. The borough is home to one of the oldest continuing motorsport events in Pennsylvania. Since 1906, the annual Giants Despair Hillclimb has challenged motorists to race uphill on a one-mile stretch of East Northampton Street.

In 1915, a mine fire started in the borough's Red Ash mine. The mine was excavated and, although the fire was declared extinguished in 1973, the fire is still burning.

Approximately 166 homes, two grocery stores, a church, a school, and a lumberyard were razed and relocated through a program administered by the Appalachian Regional Commission.

== Geography ==
Laurel Run is located at 41°13′2″N 75°50′29″W (41.217222, -75.841456).

According to the United States Census Bureau, the borough has a total area of 5.2 square miles (13.4 km^{2}), all land. The borough is sparsely populated. Most of Laurel Run consists of mountainous forests.

Laurel Run, a tributary of Mill Creek, flows through much of the borough.

== Demographics ==
Historical population
Census	Pop.	Note	%±
1890	696		—
1900	696		0.0%
1910	790		13.5%
1920	774		−2.0%
1930	944		22.0%
1940	1,057		12.0%
1950	858		−18.8%
1960	855		−0.3%
1970	327		−61.8%
1980	725		121.7%
1990	708		−2.3%
2000	723		2.1%
2010	500		−30.8%
2020	558		11.6%
2021 (est.)	563	▲	0.9%

At the time of the 2000 census, there were 723 people, 277 households, and 188 families living in the borough.

The population density was 140.9 inhabitants per square mile (54.4/km^{2}). There were 292 housing units at an average density of 56.9 per square mile (22.0/km^{2}). The racial makeup of the borough was 99.45% White, 0.28% African American, 0.14% Native American, and 0.14% from two or more races. Hispanic or Latino of any race were 0.28% of the population.

There were 277 households; 31.4% had children under the age of eighteen living with them, 54.2% were married couples living together, 7.9% had a female householder with no husband present, and 31.8% were non-families. 27.4% of households were made up of individuals, and 9.0% were one-person households with residents who were aged sixty-five or older.

The average household size was 2.43 and the average family size was 3.01.

The age distribution was 19.4% of residents who were under the age of eighteen, 8.3% who were aged eighteen to twenty-four, 30.7% who were aged twenty-five to forty-four, 29.9% who were aged forty-five to sixty-four, and 11.8% who were aged sixty-five or older. The median age was forty years.

For every one hundred females, there were 112.0 males. For every one hundred females who were aged eighteen or older, there were 113.6 males.

The median household income was $35,781 and the median family income was $40,455. Males had a median income of $28,611 compared with that of $24,500 for females.

The per capita income for the borough was $17,066.

Approximately 8.8% of families and 8.5% of the population were living below the poverty line, including 11.0% of those who were under the age of eighteen and 11.8% of those who were aged sixty-five or older.

== Education ==
It is in the Wilkes-Barre Area School District.

== Gallery ==
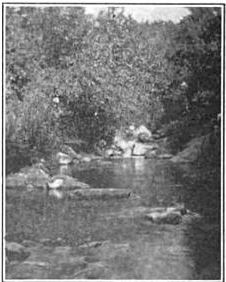
Laurel Run, c. late 1800s or early 1900s

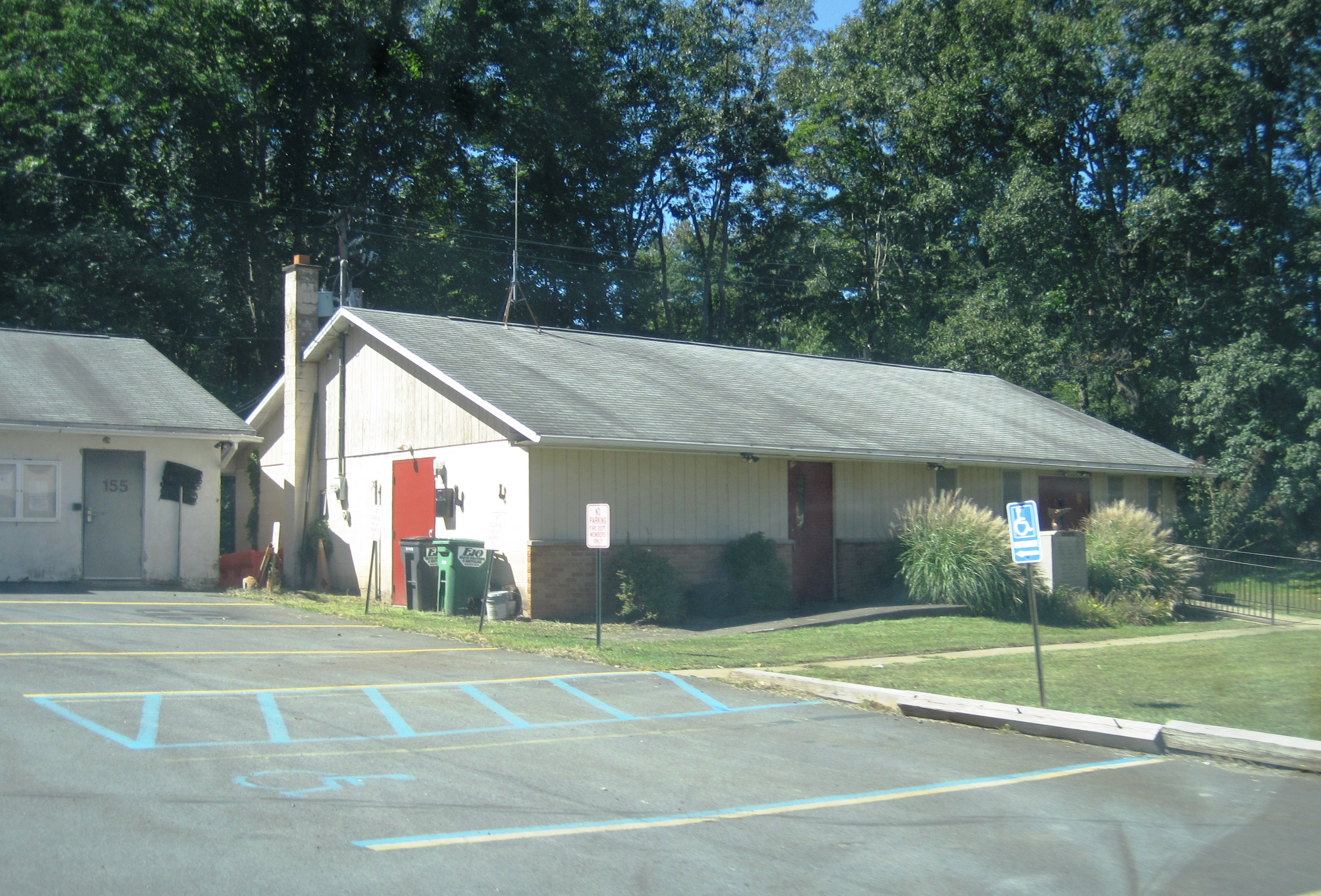
Borough municipal building
