= Scotch Run (Catawissa Creek tributary) =

Tributary of Catawissa Creek

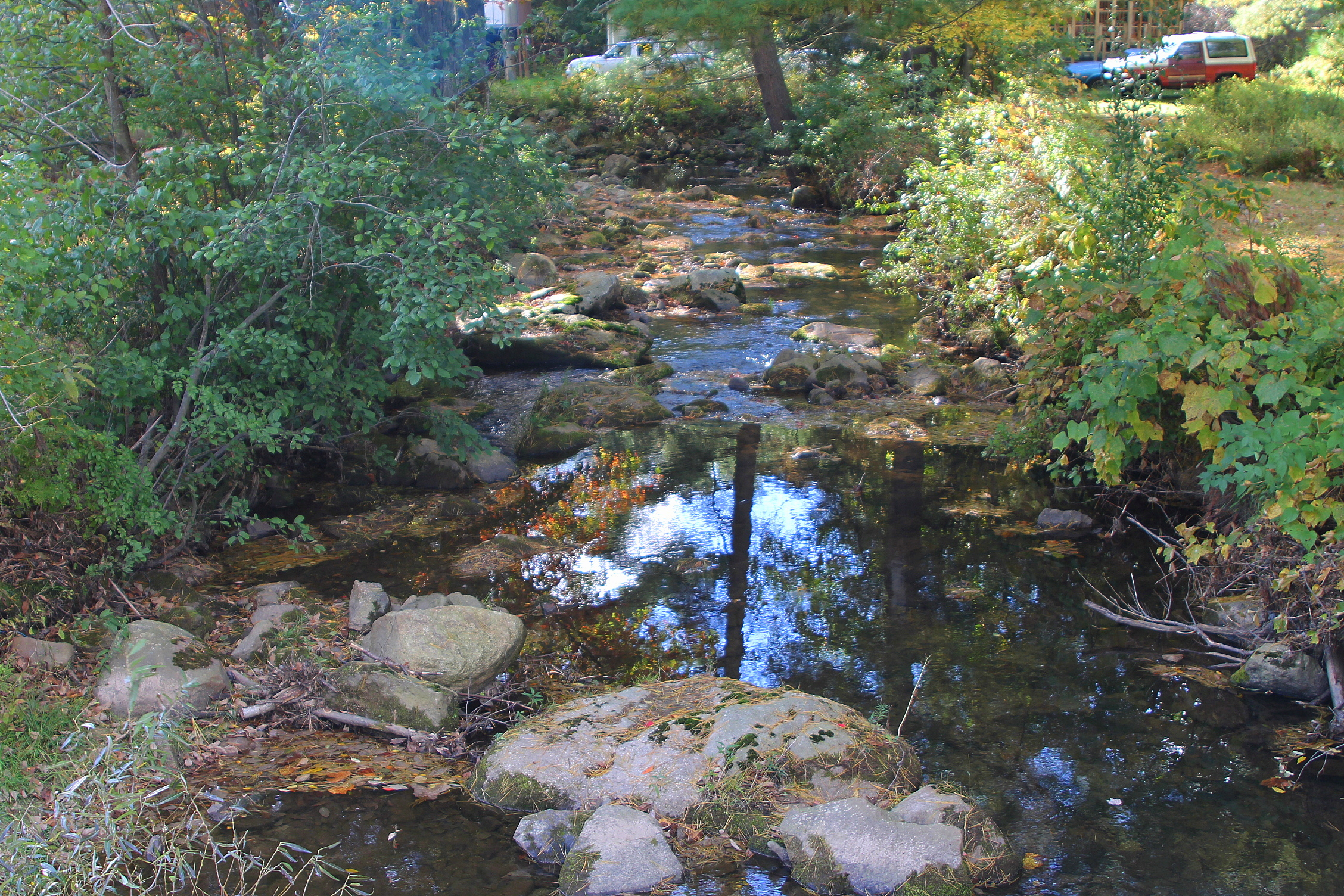
- Scotch Run at Mifflin Cross Roads

Physical characteristics
- Source
  - location: lake in a valley in Beaver Township, Columbia County, Pennsylvania
  - elevation: 1,000 to 1,020 feet (300 to 310 m)
- Mouth
  - location: Catawissa Creek in Main Township, Columbia County, Pennsylvania
  - coordinates: 40°57′46″N 76°21′28″W
  - elevation: 558 ft (170 m)
- Length: 7.8 mi (12.6 km)
- Basin size: 9.10 sq mi (23.6 km^{2})

Basin features
- Progression: Catawissa Creek → Susquehanna River → Chesapeake Bay

Scotch Run is one of the main tributaries of Catawissa Creek in Columbia County, Pennsylvania, in the United States. It is approximately 7.8 miles (12.6 km) long and flows through Beaver Township and Main Township. The stream's watershed has an area of 9.10 square miles (23.6 km^{2}). The stream is infertile and acidic. It is 7.2 feet (2.2 m) wide in its upper reaches and 17.0 feet (5.2 m) wide in its lower reaches. The main rock formations in the watershed include the Mauch Chunk Formation, the Pocono Formation, the Pottsville Formation, and the Spechty Kopf Formation. The main soils include Leck Kill soil and Hazleton soil. It flows between Nescopeck Mountain and McCauley Mountain.

Nearly all of Scotch Run's length is within 1,640 feet (500 m) of a road. However, most of its length is not within 328 feet (100 m) of one. Part of Pennsylvania State Game Lands Number 58 is in the watershed and ephemeral natural pool system is located near the stream. The area in the vicinity of the stream was settled relatively late compared to the surrounding areas. The Pennsylvania Fish and Boat Commission carried out a survey of the creek in 1977. Scotch Run is designated as a Coldwater Fishery and a Migratory Fishery. In 1997, three species of fish were observed in the upper reaches of the stream, while eight species were observed in the lower reaches. Both reaches contained brown trout and brook trout. There is a hemlock-mixed hardwood palustrine forest along the stream.

== Course ==
Scotch Run begins in a lake in a valley in eastern Beaver Township. It flows west and slightly south for several miles between Nescopeck Mountain and McCauley Mountain. The stream eventually passes through the unincorporated community of Mifflin Cross Roads. Near this community, it turns south briefly before turning west-southwest again and flowing between Nescopeck Mountain and Dry Ridge. A short distance later, the stream exits Beaver Township and enters Main Township. In Main Township, it flows between Nescopeck Mountain and Full Mill Hill for slightly more than half a mile. It then reaches its confluence with Catawissa Creek.

Scotch Run joins Catawissa Creek 8.30 miles (13.36 km) upstream of its mouth.

=== Tributaries ===
Scotch Run has no named tributaries. However, it does have one unnamed tributary, which is unofficially known as "Trib 27547 to Scotch Run" and enters the stream from the right.

== Hydrology ==
Throughout its entire length, Scotch Run is infertile and acidic. It has the potential to be affected by acid precipitation.

In June 1997, the air temperature in the vicinity of Scotch Run was measured to be 25.0 °C (77.0 °F) at river mile 5.1, 24.0 °C (75.2 °F) at river mile 1.3, and 25.0 °C (77.0 °F) at its mouth. The water temperature of the stream at these locations was measured to be 15.1 °C (59.2 °F), 14.7 °C (58.5 °F), and 15.0 °C (59.0 °F), respectively. The specific conductance of the stream was 67 micro-siemens at river mile 5.1 and 51 micro-siemens at river mile 1.3. It was 64 micro-siemens at the stream's mouth.

At river mile 5.1, the pH of the waters of Scotch Run is 6.6 and at river mile 1.3, the pH is 7.0. At the stream's mouth, the pH is 6.8. The concentration of alkalinity in the stream is 5 milligrams per liter at river mile 5.1 and 8 milligrams per liter at river mile 1.3 and at the mouth. At river mile 5.1, the level of water hardness in the stream is 23 milligrams per liter, while at river mile 1.3, the water hardness is 15 milligrams per liter. It is 18 milligrams per liter at the stream's mouth.

== Geography and geology ==
The elevation near the mouth of Scotch Run is 554 feet (169 m) above sea level. The elevation of the stream's source is between 1,000 and 1,020 feet (300 and 310 m) above sea level. Near its headwaters, the stream has a width of 7.2 feet (2.2 m). At this location, its gradient is 23 feet per mile (4.4 m/km). However, further downstream, its width is 16.9 feet (5.2 m). Its gradient at this location is 141 feet per mile (26.7 m/km).

Scotch Run flows over rock of the Mauch Chunk Formation for its entire length. However, the headwaters of its unnamed tributary, "Trib 27547 to Scotch Run" are on rock of the Pocono Formation. The Spechty Kopf Formation occurs on the northernmost edge of the watershed and the Pottsville Formation occurs not far to the south of the stream. Mining land in various stages of reclamation also occurs to the south of the stream, on McCauley Mountain.

Scotch Run flows over Leck Kill soil, a deep and well-drained fine loamy soil for its entire length. However, the northern and southern edges of the watershed are on Hazleton soil, a deep, loamy, siliceous, well-drained soil.

Scotch Run flows through the Scotch Valley. The stream flows over the lowest point between Nescopeck Mountain and McCauley Mountain. Scotch Valley is relatively narrow, but becomes somewhat wider downstream of Mifflin Cross Roads. A pond or small lake is located at the stream's headwaters. A few patches of wetland on the National Wetlands Inventory are near the stream. It is flanked by a 100 year floodplain throughout its entire length.

== Watershed ==
The watershed of Scotch Run has an area of 9.10 square miles (23.6 km^{2}). The watershed is mostly in Beaver Township, but a portion of its lower reaches is in Main Township. The watershed's northern edge is on the border between Beaver Township and Mifflin Township. The mouth of the stream is in the United States Geological Survey quadrangle of Shumans. However, its source is in the quadrangle of Nuremberg. Part of it flows through Pennsylvania State Game Lands Number 58.

In its upper reaches, (upstream of river mile 5.1 (river kilometer 8.2)), 24 percent of the length of Scotch Run is within 328 feet (100 m) of a road. A total of 71 percent is within 984 feet (300 m) and 100 percent is within 1,640 feet (500 m). Further downstream, between river mile 5.1 (river kilometer 8.2) and the mouth, 23 percent of the stream is within 328 feet (100 m) of a road, 57 percent is within 984 feet (300 m) of a road, and 90 percent is within 1,640 feet (500 m) of one. In 1990, the population density near its headwaters was 26 people per square mile (10 people per square kilometer). The population density further downstream was 41 people per square mile (16 people per square kilometer). The stream flows predominantly through rural areas.

In its upper reaches, most of Scotch Run is closed to public access. For this reason, a 1997 report stated that this section of the stream offered poor recreational opportunities. However, the report stated that the stream provided good recreational opportunities in its lower reaches. According to the report, both sections of the stream are poor sites for angling.

The upper reaches of the watershed of Scotch Run, upstream of Mifflin Cross Roads, are predominantly forested land. However, there are some residential areas near the headwaters of the stream. Downstream of Mifflin Cross Roads, the watershed contains both forested land and agricultural land. The forested land occurs primarily on the valley slopes, while the bottom of the valley contains a number of small farms. A road known as Scotch Valley Drive follows the stream's general direction up valley of the stream. A road known as LR 19015 also runs alongside to the stream for some distance.

An ephemeral natural pool system is located in the vicinity of Scotch Run. In the past, a reservoir was created on the stream by damming it. In the 21st century, a small residential area and a number of roads are present near it. The forests and vernal pools on Scotch Run are fragmented by dirt roads. The habitat quality of the area may also be impaired by all terrain vehicles. Additionally, the vernal pools may be used as breeding grounds for mosquitos.

The mouth of Scotch Run is near Mainville.

== History ==
Scotch Run was entered into the Geographic Names Information System on August 2, 1979. Its identifier in the Geographic Names Information System is 1187155.

Due to the topography of the area in the vicinity of Scotch Run, the area near the stream was not settled until some time after the first settlement in the surrounding areas. Alexander McCauley settled on the stream in Beaver Township 1774. Some time before 1820, a carding mill was built by George Fleming on the stream southeast of Mainville. In 1820, it started to be used as a school, which was run by Jacob Gensel.

The Sunbury Hazleton, and Wilkes-Barre Railroad (the later name of the Danville, Hazleton and Wilkes-Barre Railroad), followed the bank of Scotch Run throughout its length. The stream was historically well known as a trout stream.

Scotch Run was surveyed by the Pennsylvania Fish and Boat Commission prior to the 1990s. This survey was carried out by Daniels and others in 1977. However, Graff also performed water chemistry samples at the stream's mouth in 1966.

Two bridges more than 20 feet (6.1 m) long have been built over Scotch Run. The first is a steel girder bridge that was built in 1911 and is 26.9 feet (8.2 m) long. The second is a concrete culvert bridge that was built in 1974 and is also 26.9 feet (8.2 m) long.

== Biology ==
The entire drainage basin of Scotch Run is designated by the Pennsylvania Department of Environmental Protection as a Coldwater Fishery and a Migratory Fishery. The Pennsylvania Fish and Boat Commission has stocked it with adult trout. The Black Creek Sportsmens Club and the Beaver Township Rod and Gun Club also stock the stream with trout. A 1997 electrofishing survey by the Pennsylvania Fish and Boat Commission discovered a small population of wild brook trout and hatchery brook trout in the stream.

In 1997, brook trout, brown trout, and white suckers inhabited Scotch Run in its upper reaches. Two decades earlier, this part of the stream was also inhabited by pumpkinseeds and eastern blacknose dace, but not by brown trout. The reason for the disappearance of the blacknose dace is unknown. The pumpkinseeds were only present in the 1970s due to their escape from nearby farm ponds.

The lower reaches of Scotch Run were inhabited by eight species of fish in 1997: bluegills, brook trout, brown trout, blacknose dace, creek chubs, longnose dace, pumpkinseeds, white suckers. Bluegills and longnose dace were not present in this part of the stream two decades earlier, but rainbow trout and golden shiners were present at that time. The rainbow trout disappeared from the stream because the Pennsylvania Fish and Boat Commission stopped stocking them and the golden shiners were only present in the 1970s due to bait bucket introductions.

The total biomass of wild trout in Scotch Run in its upper reaches is 2.98 kilograms per hectare. 2.93 kilograms per hectare come from brook trout (2.42 kilograms per hectare of which are less than 175 millimeters long and 0.51 kilograms per hectare of which are more than 175 millimeters long). The remaining 0.05 kilograms per hectare come from brown trout, all of which are less than 175 millimeters long. This segment of the stream contains 66 brook trout less than 175 millimeters long and 3 brook trout more than 175 millimeters long per kilometer. It contains only three brown trout per kilometer, all less than 175 millimeters long. There are 174 brook trout per hectare, 166 of which are less than 175 millimeters long and eight brown trout per hectare, all of which are less than 175 millimeters long.

The total biomass of wild trout in Scotch Run in its lower reaches is 4.39 kilograms per hectare. All of the biomass comes from brook trout (3.40 kilograms per hectare of which are less than 175 millimeters long and 0.99 kilograms per hectare of which are more than 175 millimeters long). This segment of the stream contains 487 brook trout per kilometer, 480 of which are less than 175 millimeters long. There are 955 brook trout per hectare, 942 of which are less than 175 millimeters long.

Amphibians use the ephemeral natural pools on Scotch Run as a breeding ground. Amphibians inhabiting the vernal pools on the stream include spring peepers, spotted salamanders, and wood frogs.

A hemlock-mixed hardwood palustrine forest is present in the vicinity of Scotch Run east of the reservoir on the stream. The forest contains wooded wetlands and vernal pools. Trees inhabiting the forest include white oak, red oak, tulip poplar, yellow birch, eastern hemlock, American beech, and red maple. Other plants in the forest include teaberry, sphagnum moss, wood anemone, false hellebore, skunk cabbage, goldthread, and sensitive fern.

The Columbia County Natural Areas Inventory recommends establishing a riparian buffer around Scotch Run and discouraging further development and all-terrain vehicle usage.

== See also ==
- Furnace Run, next tributary of Catawissa Creek going downstream
- Fisher Run, next tributary of Catawissa Creek going upstream
- List of tributaries of Catawissa Creek
