= McCauley Mountain (Pennsylvania) =

Mountain in the state of Pennsylvania

- McAuley Mountain, McCauley's Mountain
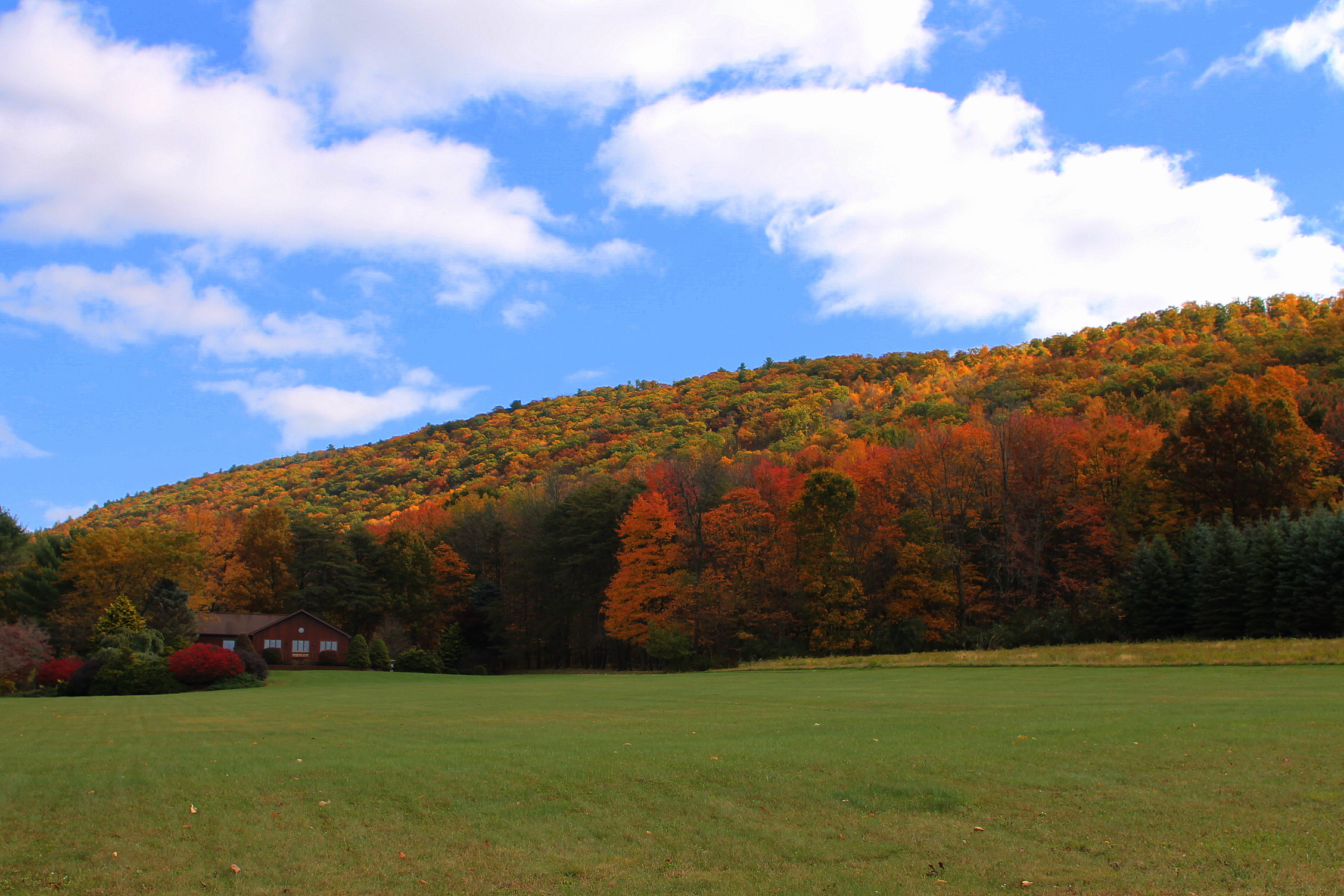
- McCauley Mountain from the northwest

Highest point
- Elevation: 1,571 ft (479 m)
- Coordinates: 40°58′01″N 76°17′59″W

Geography
- Topo map(s): Shumans, Nuremberg

Geology
- Mountain type: synclinal mountain

McCauley Mountain (also known as McAuley Mountain or McCauley's Mountain) is a mountain in Columbia County, Pennsylvania, in the United States. Its official elevation is 1,571 feet (479 m) above sea level. The mountain is a synclinal mountain. Main rock formations on and near it include the Mauch Chunk Formation and the Pottsville Formation. There are also coal deposits on it. The coal deposits were discovered in 1826 and mining of them began in the 1850s. However, coal mining on the east side of the mountain proved to be a commercial failure. There are a number of ponds on the mountain, some of which were created during the mining. However, others are natural vernal pools. Some of the ponds are surrounded by hemlocks and deciduous trees. Major streams near the mountain include Scotch Run, Beaver Run, and Catawissa Creek. The mountain is named after Alexander McCauley, who settled there in 1774.

== Geography and climate ==
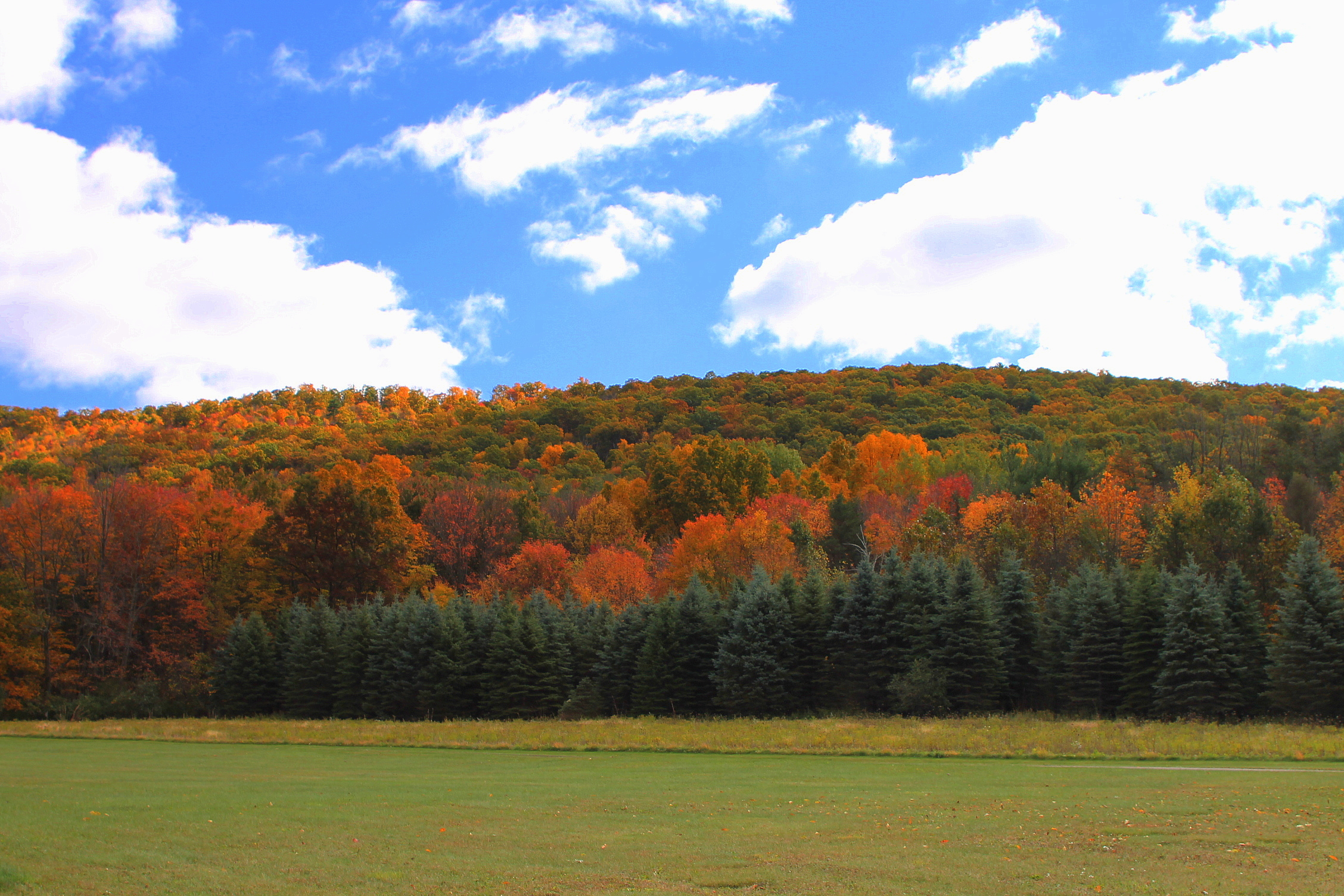
McCauley Mountain from the north

McCauley Mountain has an official elevation of 1,571 feet (479 m), making it the ninth highest mountain in Columbia County (not counting ridges).

McCauley Mountain's official coordinates are in the United States Geological Survey quadrangle of Shumans. The mountain itself occupies both that quadrangle and the quadrangle of Nuremberg. The mountain is located in northern Beaver Township. It is 9 miles (14 km) east of the borough of Catawissa.

There are a number of wetlands or ponds on McCauley Mountain. Some are natural, but others are likely to be caused by past mining activity on the mountain. The mining activity has altered the mountain's landscape in some areas.

McCauley Mountain is a synclinal mountain. The Catawissa-McCauley Mountain Synclinorium borders the Berwick anticlinorium. An area of rock of the Mauch Chunk Formation along Nescopeck Creek may represent the synlinorium's main axis.

A stream known as Scotch Run runs between McCauley Mountain and Nescopeck Mountain. A stream known as Beaver Run flows between McCauley Mountain and Buck Mountain. Catawissa Creek flows near McCauley Mountain near where Beaver Run flows into the creek.

A spot on the site of McCauley Mountain was described as being "one of the coldest spots in the township [Beaver Township] in winter" in J.H. Beers' 1915 book Historical and Biographical Annals of Columbia and Montour Counties, Pennsylvania.

== Geology ==
McCauley Mountain is surrounded by rock of the Mauch Chunk Formation. This rock formation is at least 2,000 feet (610 m) thick in this location. Outcroppings of a conglomerate known as the Pottsville Formation appear on the surface of the mountain. There are numerous deposits of coal on the summit of McCauley Mountain.

A coal basin known as the McCauley Basin is located on the mountain. This basin is approximately 4 miles (6.4 km) northwest of a coal basin known as the Roberts Run Basin. The area containing usable coal is 2 miles (3.2 km) long and 0.25 to 0.33 miles (0.40 to 0.53 km) wide. The basin contains two beds of coal, which are most likely seams of the Lower White-Ash Group. In the central part of the mountain, there is a large area of partially reclaimed mining land. There are also patches of dry strip mines and spoil piles.

There is an ice lobe from the Illinoian period near the eastern end of McCauley Mountain.

== History and etymology ==
Alexander McCauley, one of the first European settlers in Beaver Township, moved to an area in the vicinity of McCauley Mountain in 1774. The mountain was named for him in the late 1700s or early 1800s. The United States Board on Geographic Names decided on the mountain's name in 1909. It was added to the Geographic Names Information System on August 2, 1979. Its identifier in the Geographic Names Information System is 1180620.

The coal deposits on McCauley Mountain were discovered as early as 1826. A large number of mining operations were carried out on the mountain during the 1800s. The McCauley Railroad Company was incorporated on May 5, 1854, and was built in 1855 and 1856. The company's railroad ran 5 miles (8.0 km) from the Catawissa Railroad to the coal fields on the mountain. The McCauley Railroad Company was merged into the Columbia Iron and Coal Company on April 19, 1858. Mining began in 1858.

Attempts at mining coal on the eastern side of McCauley Mountain proved to be a major disaster for all the corporations that attempted it. However, the McCauley Colliery operated on the mountain from 1873 to 1876 and the Glen City Colliery also had operations there. The McCauley Colliery was operated by Long, Fisher and Shaffer, the successor of the Columbia Coal and Iron Company. At around this time, Simon P. Kase owned the western side of the mountain and the land that the McCauley Railroad passed through. Mining operations continued into the 20th century, at least as late as 1911. One mine on the mountain was known as the Glen City mine and it was located south of the community of Glen City. It was on lands partially belonging to Simon P. Kase and was operated by W. A. M. Grier.

Historically, there were a number of farms on McCauley Mountain. One of them was owned by H. M. Hess in the early 1900s. As late as the 1910s, the St. Peter's Evangelical Lutheran Church (previously known as the Harger's Church) was located on the side of the mountain. In the 1910s, it was the only church building in southern Columbia County.

As of 2004, there is a possibility that utility right-of-ways and communication towers will be constructed on McCauley Mountain. The Columbia County Natural Areas Inventory advises against having all terrain vehicle trails near the ponds on the mountain.

== Biology ==
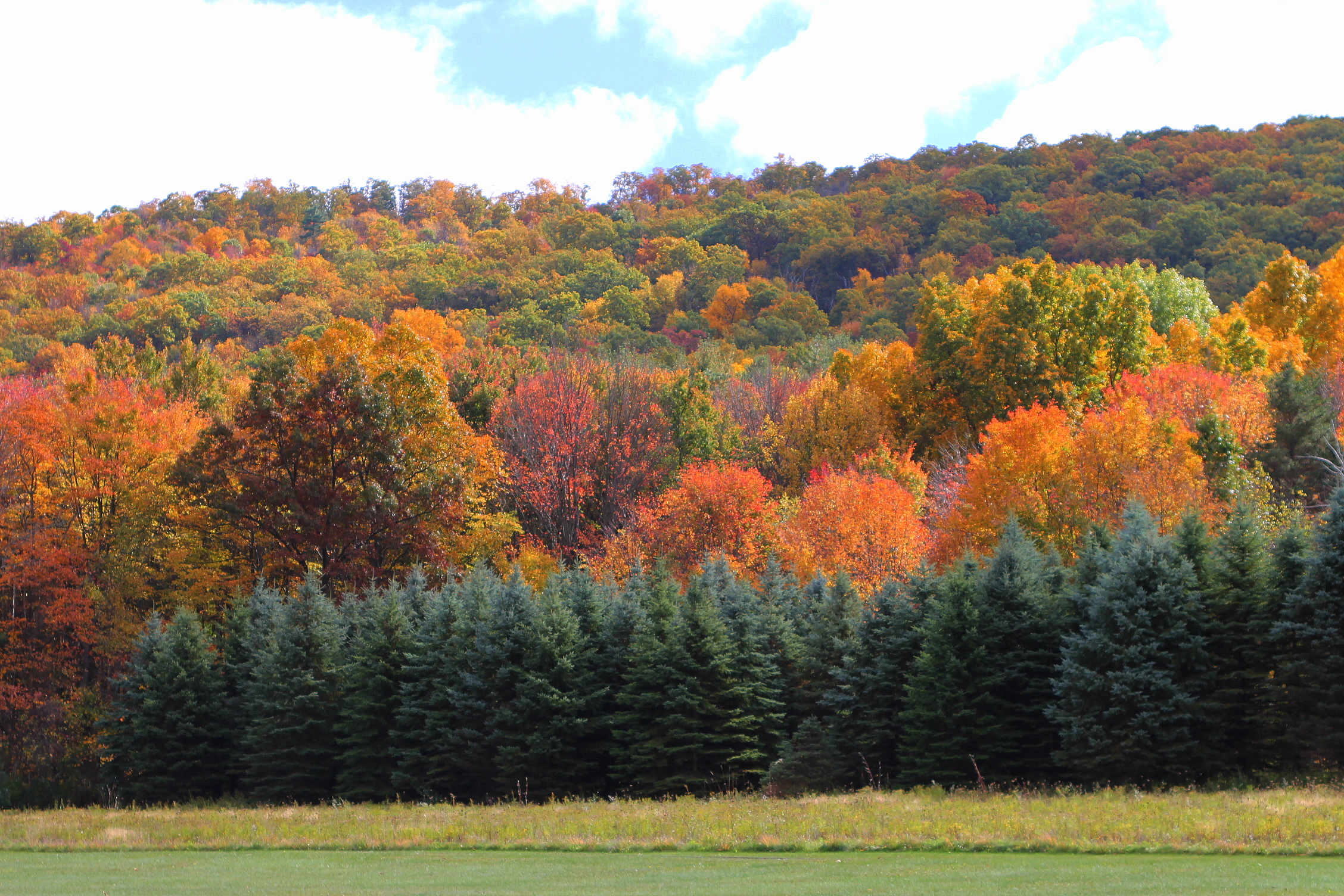
Forests on McCauley Mountain

McCauley Mountain is listed as a Locally Significant Site on the Columbia County Natural Areas Inventory. Its priority rank is 5 on a scale of 1 to 5, with 1 being the highest priority.

Several of the ponds on McCauley Mountain are surrounded by hemlock trees and other deciduous trees. These patches of deciduous forest are relatively undisturbed.

== See also ==
- Catawissa Mountain, nearby mountain
- Nescopeck Mountain, nearby mountain
