= Furnace Run (Catawissa Creek tributary) =

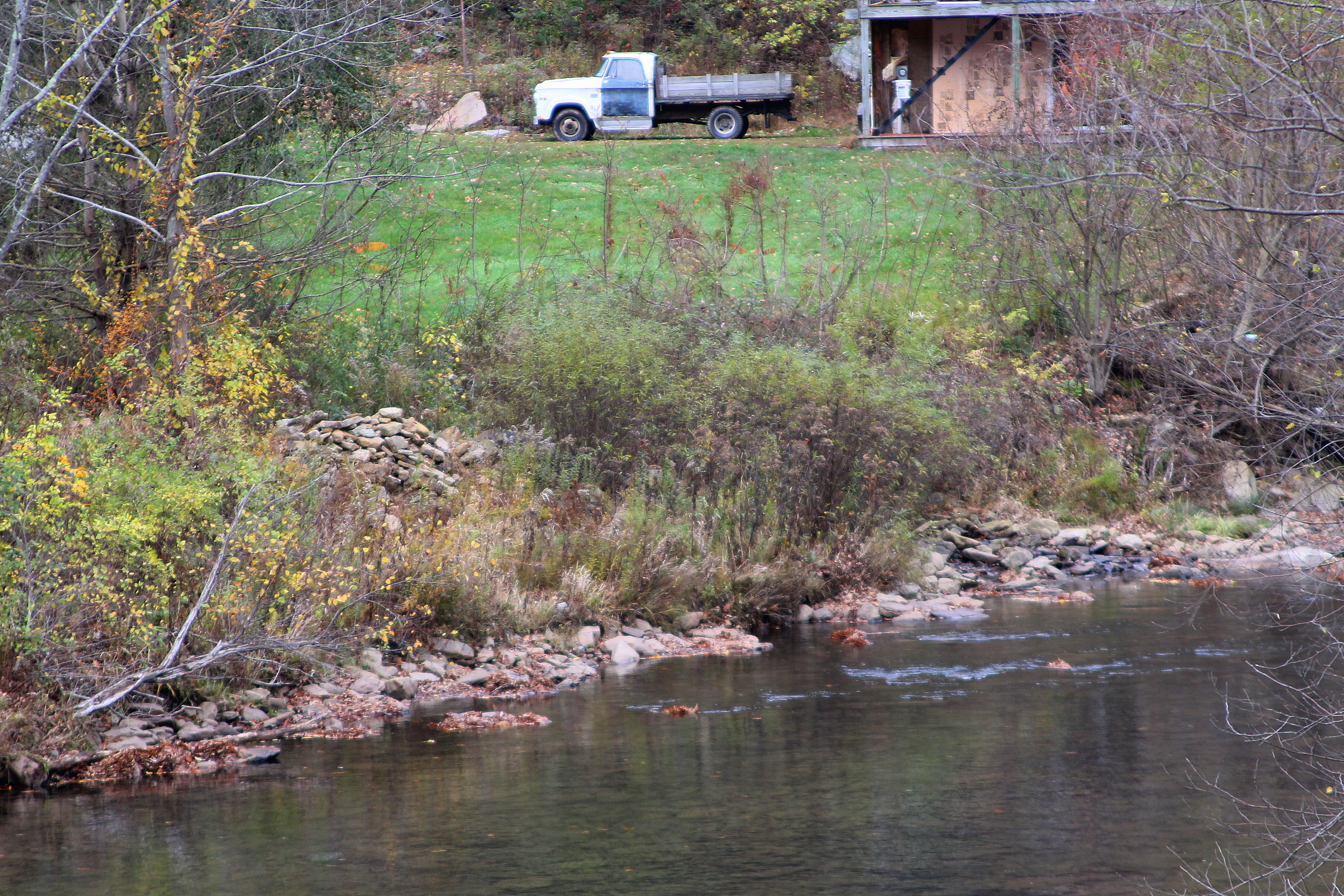
- Catawissa Creek at the mouth of Furnace Run. The mouth is near the center of the picture.
- Etymology: named after a nearby furnace

Physical characteristics
- Source
  - location: Catawissa Mountain in eastern Catawissa Township, Columbia County, Pennsylvania
  - elevation: 1,440 to 1,460 feet (440 to 450 m)
- Mouth
  - location: Catawissa Creek in Main Township, Columbia County, Pennsylvania
  - coordinates: 40°57′49″N 76°22′24″W
  - elevation: 551 ft (168 m)
- Length: 2.5 mi (4.0 km)
- Basin size: 2.82 mi^{2} (7.3 km^{2})

Basin features
- Progression: Catawissa Creek → Susquehanna River → Chesapeake Bay
- Tributaries
  - right: Trib 27545 to Furnace Run

Furnace Run is a tributary of Catawissa Creek in Columbia County, Pennsylvania, in the United States. It is approximately 2.5 miles (4.0 km) long and flows through Catawissa Township and Main Township. The stream is the last named tributary to enter Catawissa Creek before its mouth. The stream's watershed has an area of 2.82 square miles (7.3 km^{2}). The main rock formations are the Pottsville Group and the Mauch Chunk Formation. The stream itself is considered to be a high quality coldwater fishery and Class A Wild Trout Waters.

== Course ==
Furnace Run begins on Catawissa Mountain in eastern Catawissa Township. It flows northeast in a valley and enters Main Township after approximately a thousand feet. After continuing northeast for a few tenths of a mile, it turns east-southeast. A short distance downstream, it receives an unnamed tributary and turns east-northeast and crosses a road. More than a mile further downstream, the stream reaches its confluence with Catawissa Creek.

Furnace Run joins Catawissa Creek 7.37 miles (11.86 km) upstream of its mouth.

=== Tributaries ===
Furnace Run has one unnamed tributary. It is known as "Trib 27545 to Furnace Run".

== Geography, geology, and hydrology ==
The elevation near the mouth of Furnace Run is 551 feet (168 m) above sea level. The elevation of the stream at its source is between 1,440 feet (440 m) and 1,460 feet (450 m) above sea level.

The main rock formation in the watershed of Furnace Run is the Pocono Formation. However, the Mauch Chunk Formation is found in the watershed's lower reaches. The main soils in the watershed are the Hazleton soil and the Leck Kill soil.

The total concentration of alkalinity in the watershed of Furnace Run is 2 milligrams per liter.

== Watershed ==
The watershed of Furnace Run has an area of 2.82 square miles (7.3 km^{2}). The upper reaches of the watershed are in the Pennsylvania State Game Lands Number 58. The watershed of the stream is mostly in southwestern Main Township, but a portion of it is in southeastern Catawissa Township.

== History ==
A furnace known as the Catawissa Furnace was constructed on Furnace Run near Mainville in 1815 by John Hauck.

Furnace Run was named in the middle of the 1800s after an iron furnace that was located in its vicinity. A nineteenth-century school district or geographical district known as the Furnace District was located in Cleveland Township. It was named after Furnace Run.

== Biology ==
The Pennsylvania Department of Environmental Protection classifies Furnace Run as a high-quality coldwater fishery. The stream is considered by the Pennsylvania Fish and Boat Commission to be Class A Wild Trout Waters from its headwaters to its mouth.

Brook trout inhabit Furnace Run and reproduce naturally there.

== See also ==
- Scotch Run (Catawissa Creek), next tributary of Catawissa Creek going upstream
- List of tributaries of Catawissa Creek
