= Corn Run =

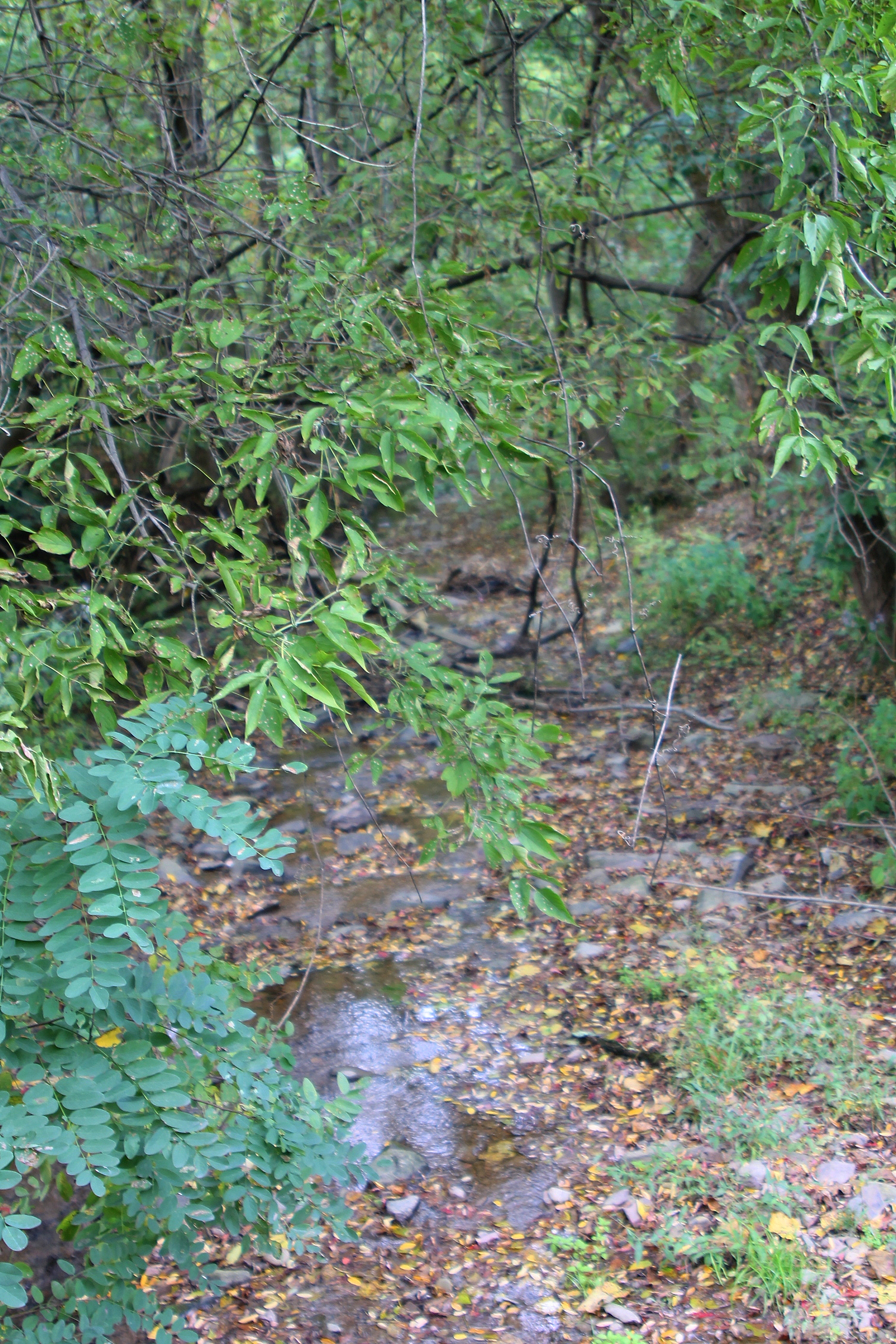
- Corn Run in Catawissa
- Etymology: named after the corn that fell into it during a 1904 flood

Physical characteristics
- Source
  - location: near Breezy Acres in Catawissa Township, Columbia County, Pennsylvania
  - elevation: 780 to 800 feet (240 to 240 m)
- Mouth
  - location: Susquehanna River in Catawissa, Columbia County, Pennsylvania
  - coordinates: 40°57′29″N 76°27′53″W
  - elevation: 459 ft (140 m)
- Length: 2.8 mi (4.5 km)
- Basin size: 2.29 mi^{2} (5.9 km^{2})

Basin features
- Progression: Susquehanna River → Chesapeake Bay

Corn Run is a tributary of the Susquehanna River in Columbia County, Pennsylvania, United States. It is approximately 2.8 miles (4.5 km) long and flows through Catawissa Township and Catawissa. The stream's watershed has an area of 2.29 square miles (5.9 km^{2}). Corn Run was historically known as Roberts Run. The stream is listed as a coldwater fishery.

== Course ==
Corn Run begins near the community of Breezy Acres in Catawissa Township. It flows southwest for approximately half a mile before receiving an unnamed tributary and turning south for a short distance. The stream then picks up another unnamed tributary and turns west-southwest for some distance, receiving another unnamed tributary along the way. It eventually starts flowing parallel to State Route 3015 and turns south and enters Catawissa. In Catawissa, the stream turns east, crosses a railroad, and reaches its confluence with the Susquehanna River.

Corn Run joins the Susquehanna River 146.17 miles (235.24 km) upstream of its mouth.

== Geography ==
The elevation near the mouth of Corn Run is 459 feet (140 m) above sea level. The elevation near its source is between 780 feet (240 m) and 800 feet (240 m). There are some steep slopes in the vicinity of the stream.

There are seven obstructions on Corn Run and they are assigned numbers between 31 and 37. The obstructions include a stone box, a concrete box, an iron culvert, and several others.

== Watershed ==
The watershed of Corn Run has an area of 2.29 square miles (5.9 km^{2}). Parts of the watershed are forested and there are also some ponds near the stream. However, the areas of the watershed that are within the stream's flood boundary are moderately populated residential areas.

A total of 1.16 square miles (3.0 km^{2}) of land in the watershed of Corn Run are in flood zones. 0.25 square miles (0.65 km^{2}) are in Catawissa and 0.91 square miles (2.4 km^{2}) are in Catawissa Township.

A portion of Corn Run is in a development, which is known as Roberts Addition as of 1982.

The entire drainage basin of Corn Run is considered to be a coldwater fishery.

== History and etymology ==
Corn Run was historically known as Roberts Run, after Moses Roberts, who was one of the earliest settlers of Catawissa. During a flood in 1904, bushels of corn were washed into the stream, causing it to be renamed Corn Run. The new name of the stream was popular among locals by 1915. However, it was still referred to as Roberts Run on some maps as late as the 1950s.

The Creasey Farm, which was owned by Nathan Creasey, was historically located on Corn Run.

== See also ==
- Catawissa Creek, next tributary of the Susquehanna River going downriver
- Fishing Creek (North Branch Susquehanna River), next tributary of the Susquehanna River going upriver
- List of rivers of Pennsylvania
