= Nescopeck Mountain =

Ridge in Columbia and Luzerne Counties, Pennsylvania

Coordinates: 41.007°N 76.221°W

- Nescopec Mountain; Niskëpèk (Unami)
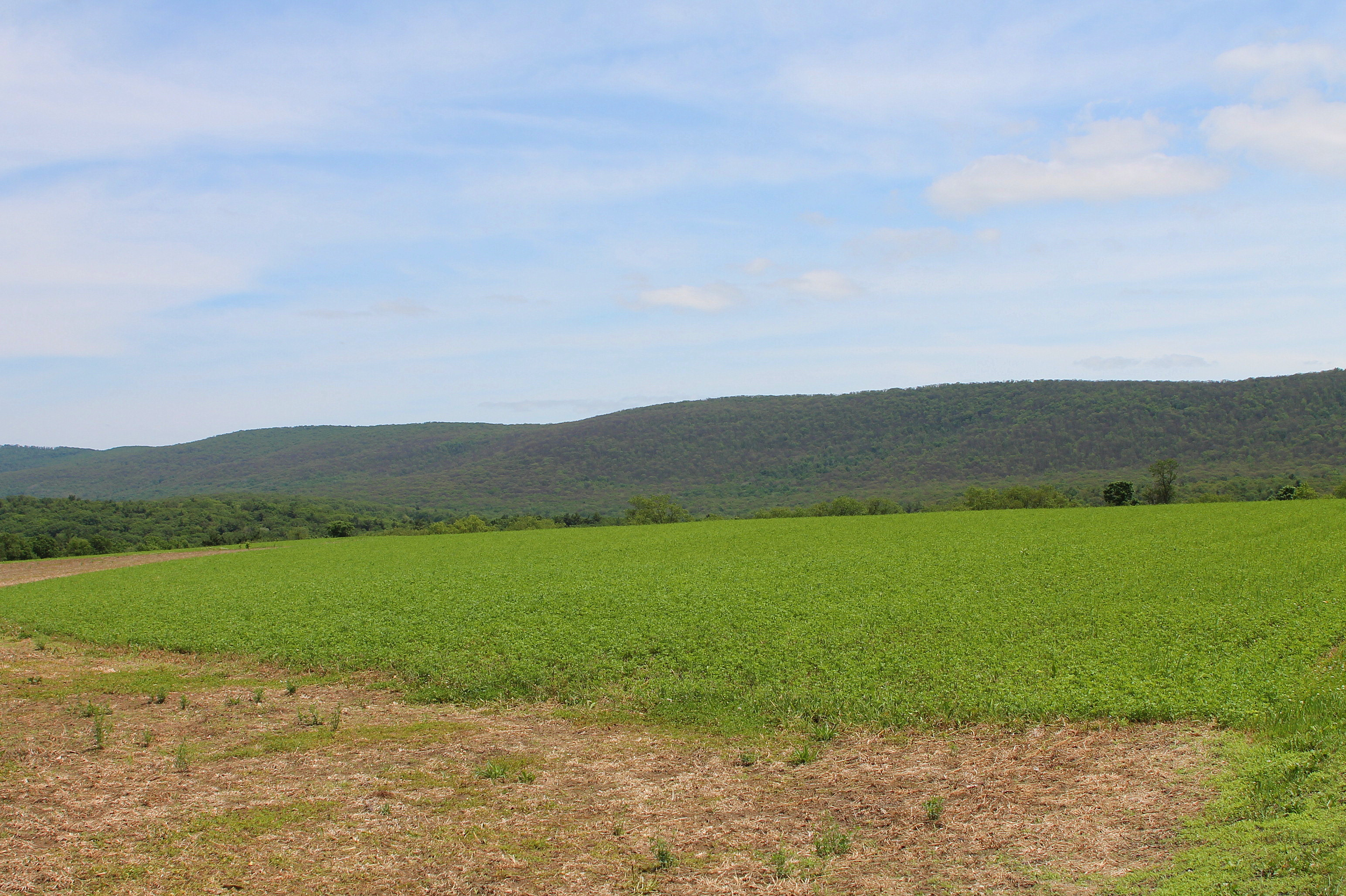
- Nescopeck Mountain in Luzerne County, Pennsylvania

Highest point
- Elevation: 1,594 ft (486 m)
- Prominence: up to 850 or 900 feet (260 or 270 m)

Geography
- Parent range: chain of mountains from Moosic to the Susquehanna River
- Topo map(s): Shumans, Nuremberg, Berwick, Sybertsville, Freeland, and White Haven

Geology
- Mountain type: Ridge

Nescopeck Mountain (also known as Nescopec Mountain) is a ridge in Columbia County and Luzerne County, in Pennsylvania, in the United States. Its elevation is 1,594 feet (486 m) above sea level. The ridge is a forested ridge, with at least two types of forest and two systems of vernal pools. It is a very long and unbroken ridge with two water gaps: one carved by Catawissa Creek and one carved by Nescopeck Creek. This later gap was exploited as a transportation corridor with the construction of the Lausanne–Nescopeck Turnpike between the respective frontier communities at Lausanne Landing and Nescopeck (opposite bank from Shickshinny, PA on the Susquehanna River) in 1805 connecting the newly developing Wyoming Valley with Philadelphia and the Delaware River valley; cutting off over 100 miles between Philadelphia and Wilkes-Barre. Today's Route PA 93 derives from this historic pack mule road.

Rock formations in the ridge include the Lower Helderberg Formation, the Onondaga Formation, the Spechty Kopf Formation, the Trimmers Rock Formation, and the Mauch Chunk Formation. In the most recent ice age, it was affected by glaciation.

Native Americans historically settled in the vicinity of Nescopeck Mountain. It was visited by Europeans as early as 1755. The ridge's name most likely means "dirty waters" or "black waters". Two Pennsylvania State Game Lands and one state park are situated partially on it. The ridge spans numerous townships in Columbia County and Luzerne County.

== Geography ==
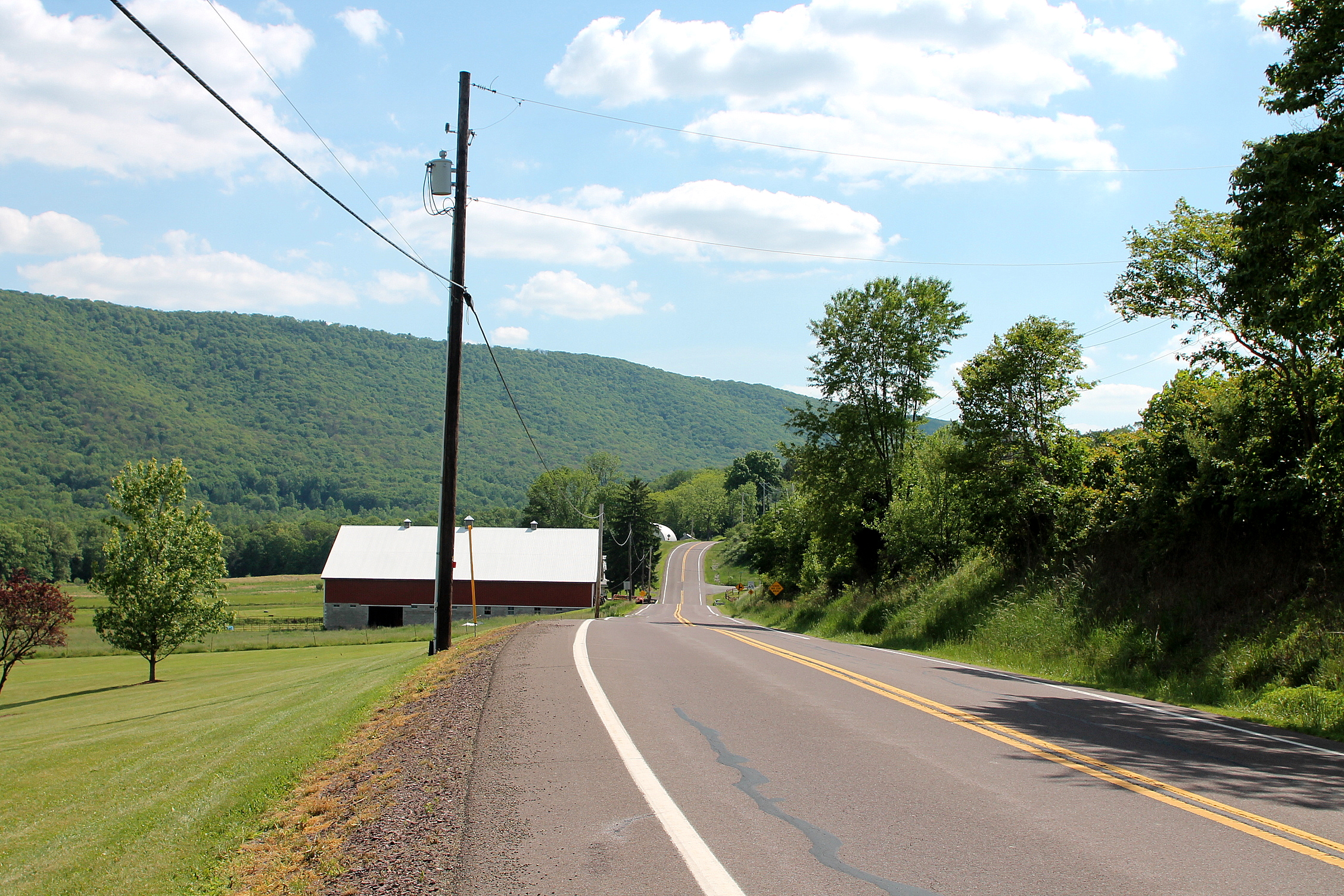
Nescopeck Mountain and Pennsylvania Route 339 from the north in Mifflin Township, Columbia County, Pennsylvania

The elevation of Nescopeck Mountain is 1,594 feet (486 m) above sea level, making it the highest ridge in Columbia County. Townships that Nescopeck Mountain occupies include Beaver Township, Mifflin Township, and Main Township in Columbia County. The ridge extends into several townships in Luzerne County, including Nescopeck Township, and reaches at least as far east as Nescopeck State Park.

Nescopeck Mountain is an unbroken ridge, being described as "regular and almost unbroken" in Thomas Francis Gordon's 1832 book A Gazetteer of the State of Pennsylvania. John Gosse Freeze's 1888 book A History of Columbia County, Pennsylvania: From the Earliest Times described the ridge as "beautiful and regular in its formation". It stretches from near the Susquehanna River almost to the Lehigh River and has a length of nearly 20 miles (32 km). It is considerably steeper and higher on its northern side, at least in the United States Geological Survey quadrangle of Berwick. The ridge is too rocky for agriculture, with large boulders being abundant on it.

Nescopeck Mountain is part of a long chain of continuously forested mountains and ridges that stretches from Moosic Mountain to the Susquehanna River. It is considered to be an extension of Catawissa Mountain. The ridge is similar in height to mountains in the vicinity of the Wyoming Valley. The ridge has a topographic prominence of up to approximately 850 feet (260 m) in places and up to 900 feet (270 m) at the Nescopeck Creek water gap. However, it is only 400 to 500 feet (120 to 150 m) high near its western end at Mainville.

Interstate 80 crosses through the water gap carved by Nescopeck Creek in Nescopeck Mountain. The Susquehanna River Lowlands are in the vicinity of the ridge. Large groups of small kettle holes are found along the base of the ridge.

Nescopeck Mountain occupies the United States Geological Survey quadrangles of Shumans, Nuremberg, Berwick, Sybertsville, Freeland, and White Haven.

== Streams and valleys ==
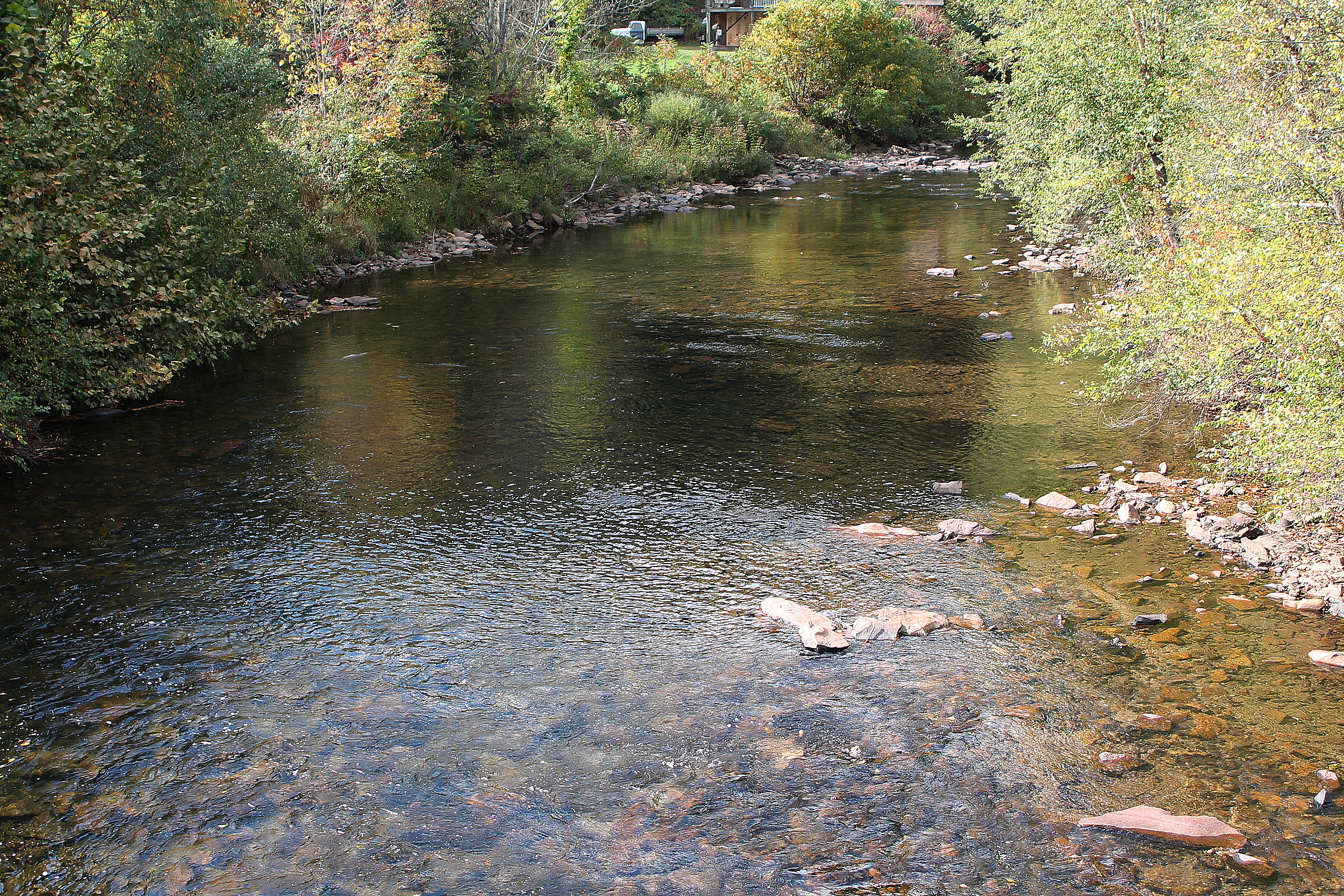
Catawissa Creek just upstream of where it cuts between Catawissa Mountain and Nescopeck Mountain

A creek known as Nescopeck Creek is in the vicinity of Nescopeck Mountain. Additionally, Black Creek, a major tributary of Nescopeck Creek, empties into the larger creek at the base of the ridge. The ridge is north of the creek for a portion of its length. There is a valley known as the Nescopeck Valley which is between Nescopeck Mountain and Buck Mountain. Nescopeck Creek flows through this valley. The valley is 20 miles (32 km) long and 5 miles (8.0 km) wide. Some streams on the ridge are part of the Lehigh River watershed.

A stream known as Scotch Run flows through a valley with Nescopeck Mountain on its northern edge.

Nescopeck Mountain forms a water gap with Catawissa Mountain. Catawissa Creek cuts through this water gap. There is also a water gap carved by Nescopeck Creek through Nescopeck Mountain. Both of these water gaps are relatively narrow. The mountain serves as part of the dividing line between the Susquehanna River and the Lehigh River watersheds. For some distance, the ridge runs parallel to the Susquehanna River at a distance of 2.5 to 3 miles (4.0 to 4.8 km).

== Geology ==
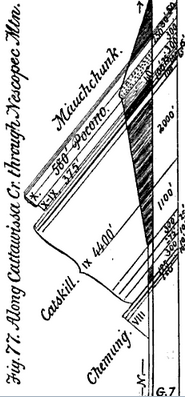
Illustration of the geology of Nescopeck Mountain at Catawissa Creek c. 1883

Nescopeck Mountain is mainly formed by hard, upturned conglomerates belonging to the Pocono Formation. There are a total of three rock formations on Nescopeck Mountain in the Berwick Quadrangle, which is in Columbia County and Luzerne County. From north to south, these rock formations are the Trimmers Rock Formation (from the Devonian Period), the Spechty Kopf Formation (from the Devonian Period and the Mississippian Period), and the Onondaga Formation (from the Devonian Period). All three of these formations occur in bands that are at an angle relative to the surface. The Spechty Kopf Formation occurs at the peak of the ridge and extends to a depth of approximately 1,500 feet (460 m) below sea level. The Onondaga Formation runs from near the ridge's peak to 1,000 feet (300 m) below sea level. The Trimmers Rock Formation runs from the middle elevations of the ridge to more than 2,000 feet (610 m) below sea level. Additionally, the Mauch Chunk Formation is found on the ridge. The summit of the ridge consists of hard Pocono Formation rock. A plain of the Catskill Formation occurs to the north of the ridge.

There are coal basins to the south of Nescopeck Mountain.

During an ice age, glaciers pressed against Nescopeck Mountain and eventually moved over it, carrying gravel from the Susquehanna River. The ridge was near the southern edge of the most recent period of glaciation.

== History and etymology ==
Nescopeck Mountain was entered into the Geographic Names Information System on August 2, 1979. Its identifier in the Geographic Names Information System is 1190986. The ridge is also known as Nescopec Mountain. This variant name appears in Israel C. White's 1883 book The geology of the North Branch Susquehanna River Region in the six counties of Wyoming, Lackawanna, Luzerne, Columbia, Montour and Northumberland. Nescopeck Mountain is most likely named for a Native American village called Nescopeck. The word nescopeck itself is a corruption of neskchoppeck, which may mean "dirty waters" or "black waters".

Historically, there was a Native American village in the vicinity of Nescopeck Mountain, where the borough of Nescopeck is in modern times. Additionally, the Forks Indians arrived at the ridge in 1740 after being evicted from their lands in the Lehigh Valley. As early as 1755, a pair of Moravian missionaries, Christian Seidel and Henry Frey, descended the ridge while visiting Native Americans.

In 1838, a man named Mr. Butler requested permission of the Pennsylvania House of Representatives to construct a tunnel or through cut through Nescopeck Mountain for the Lehigh Coal and Navigation Company. In the late 1800s and early 1900s, the Glen Summit Springs Hotel operated on top of Nescopeck Mountain. It was constructed by the Lehigh Valley Railroad Company. During its most active use, it attracted visitors from the Wyoming Valley and from the East Coast of the United States. The Lehigh Valley Railroad historically passed over the ridge. In the late 1800s, the ridge was prospected for coal.

The top of Nescopeck Mountain was devoid of trees by the middle of the 1800s. Logging has been done on the ridge in the early 2000s and plans have been made to construct communication towers on the ridge. Local produce is sometimes traded over Nescopeck Mountain. The mountain is almost completely undeveloped.

A gypsy moth infestation began on Nescopeck Mountain in the summer of 2014, causing hundreds of trees to be defoliated. The Bureau of Forestry expects to begin spraying the area in May 2015 and June 2015.

== Biology ==
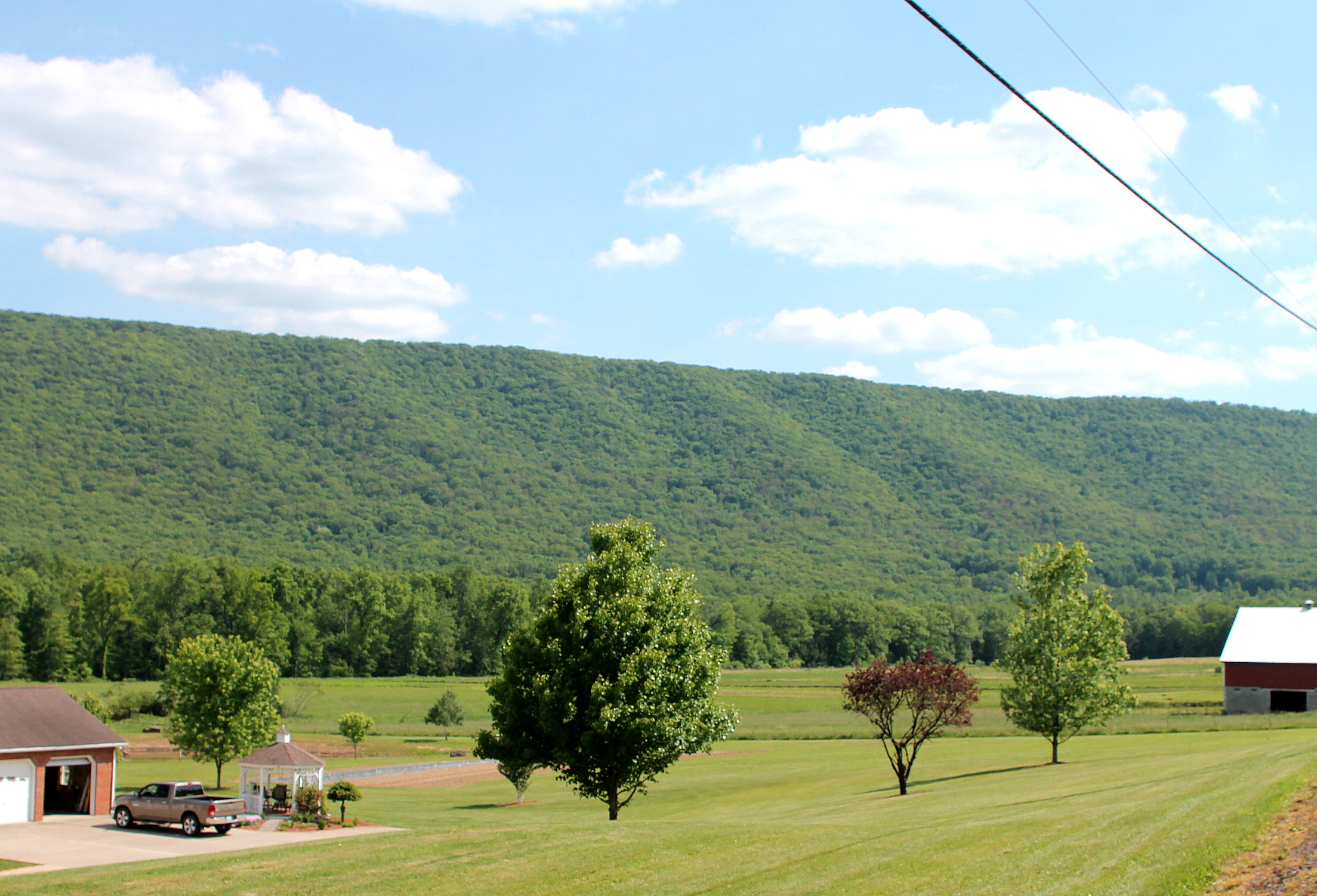
Nescopeck Mountain, a forested ridge

Nescopeck Mountain is one of several mountains in Columbia County to contain undisturbed oak/mixed hardwood forests. This forest is also an Appalachian Oak Forest. Specific tree species on the ridge in Columbia County include red oak, chestnut oak, scarlet oak, black birch, American chestnut, pitch pine, red maple, and serviceberry. Other plants on the ridge include black huckleberry, lowbush blueberry, mountain laurel, sheep's laurel, bracken fern, wild sarsaparilla, and Virginia creeper.

An ephemeral/fluctuating pool natural community known as the Edgewood Vernal Pools is located on and near Nescopeck Mountain. It consists of dozens of vernal pools created by glaciation. Numerous amphibian species breed in the pools and hardwood trees and hemlock are present on the southern edge of the pool system. A globally rare species of invertebrate was observed in the pools in 1990. Another system of vernal pools known as the Briggsville Vernal Pools are found north of the ridge.

The Nescopeck Mountain Barrens are a ridgetop dwarf-tree forest natural community. The barrens consist of scrub oaks, hairgrass, pitch pines, little bluestems, and blueberries.

== Recreation ==
A portion of the Pennsylvania State Game Lands Number 58 is on Nescopeck Mountain. Additionally, the Pennsylvania State Game Lands Number 187 contain the Nescopeck Mountain Barrens. The ridge is on the northern border of the 3550-acre Nescopeck State Park. Historically, there were trails leading up to the top of Nescopeck Mountain. There is high visibility from the top of the ridge and the town of Bloomsburg can be seen.

The water gap where Catawissa Creek flows between Nescopeck Mountain and Catawissa Mountain was described as "attractive" by I. W. Hartman in 1912. The water gap where Nescopeck Creek flows through Nescopeck Mountain is described as "impressive" in Jeff Mitchell's book Paddling Pennsylvania.
