= Mifflin Cross Roads, Pennsylvania =

Unincorporated community in Pennsylvania, U.S.

Coordinates: 40°58′15″N 76°18′55″W

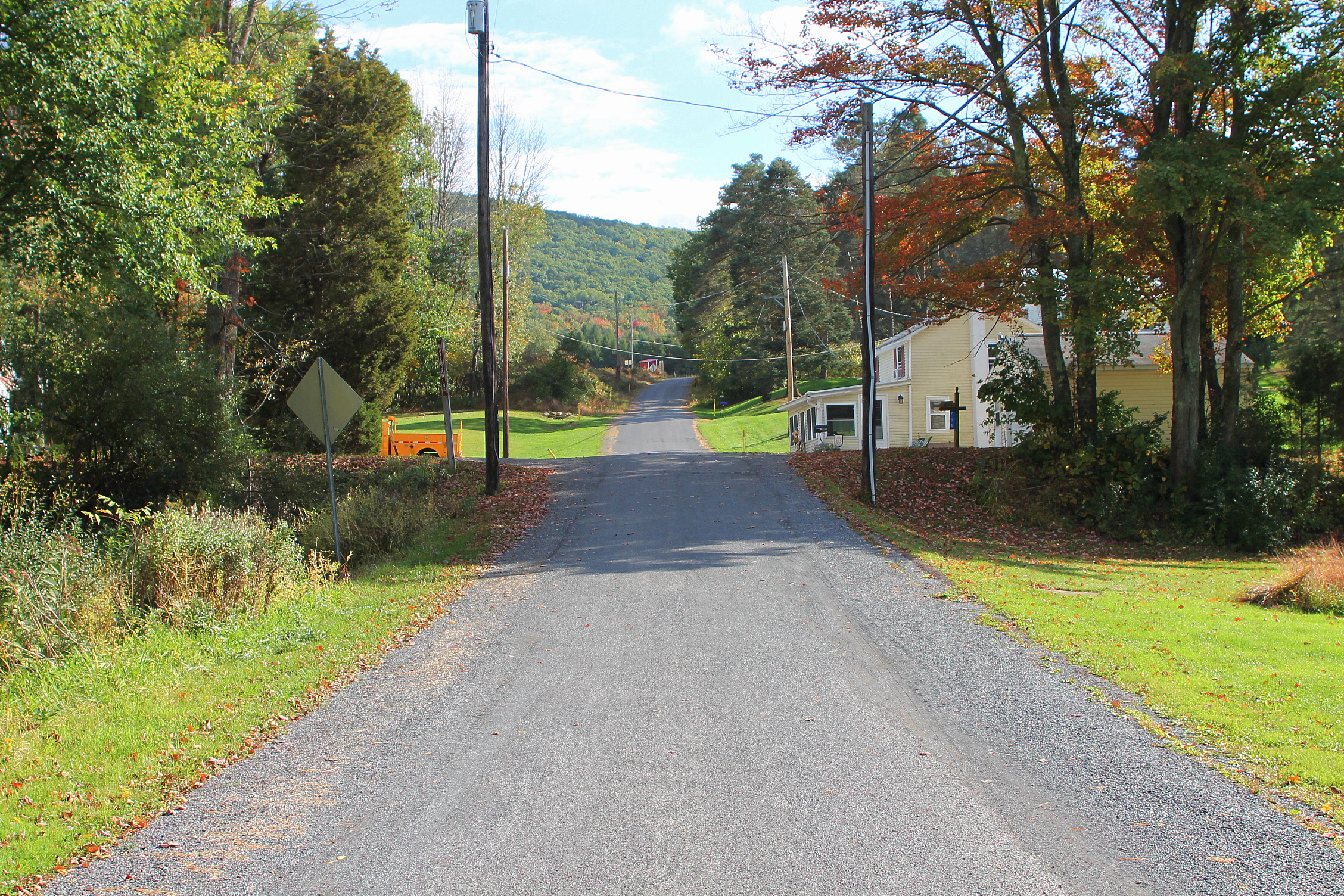
Mifflin X Road in Mifflin Cross Roads

Mifflin Cross Roads is an unincorporated community in Beaver Township, Columbia County, Pennsylvania, United States. It is part of Northeastern Pennsylvania.

It is named after Thomas Mifflin, first governor of Pennsylvania, and located three miles east of Mainville.

In the Geographic Names Information System (GNIS), its name is misspelled as "Miffin Cross Roads" (the "l" is missing).

== History ==
Maps from 1876 and 1895 show a railroad station in Mifflin Cross Roads. In 1876, the community was served by the Danville, Hazelton and Wilkes-Barre railroad. By 1895, this railroad had become part of the Pennsylvania Railroad. Postal records show that in 1891, the community was large enough to warrant a post office.
