= Beaver Township, Columbia County, Pennsylvania =

Township in Pennsylvania, US

Coordinates: 41°00′01″N 76°13′59″W

- Township
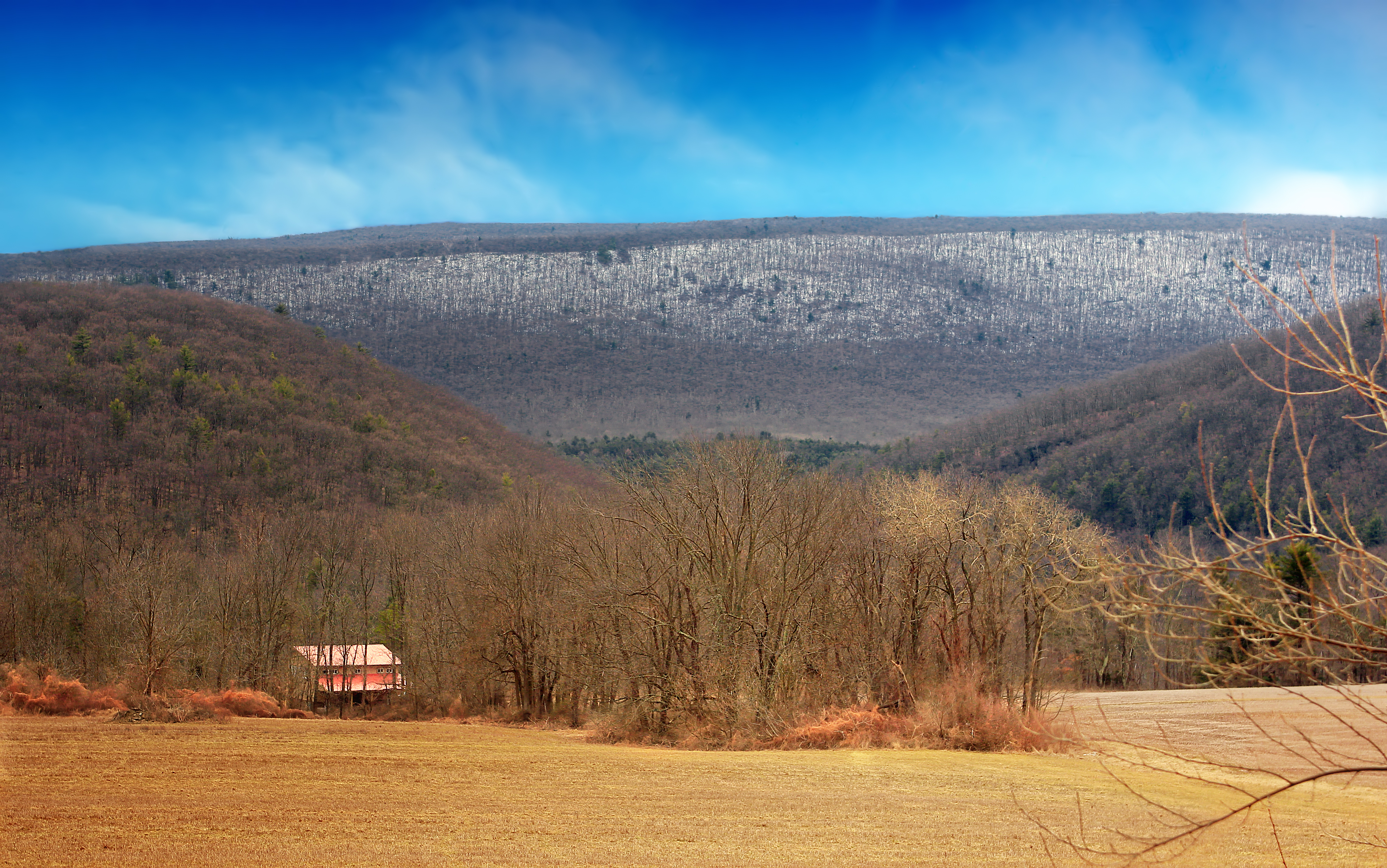

- Logo

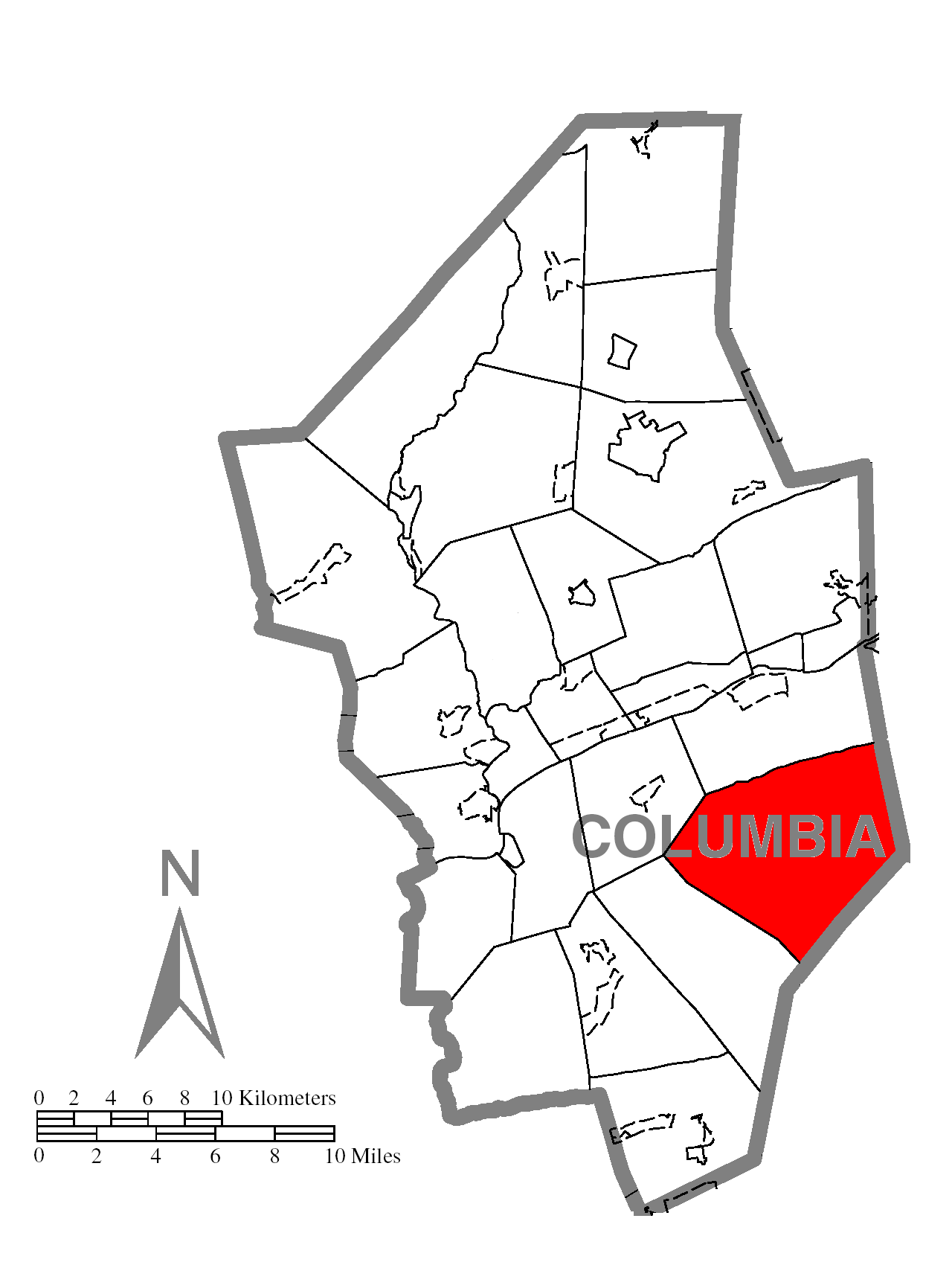
- Map of Columbia County, Pennsylvania highlighting Beaver Township

- Map of Columbia County, Pennsylvania
- Country: United States
- State: Pennsylvania
- County: Columbia
- Settled: 1774
- Incorporated: 1845

Area
  - Total: 35.79 sq mi (92.70 km^{2})
  - Land: 35.39 sq mi (91.67 km^{2})
  - Water: 0.40 sq mi (1.03 km^{2})

Population (2020)
  - Total: 879 ▼
  - Estimate (2021): 886
  - Density: 25.9/sq mi (10.01/km^{2})
- Time zone: UTC-5 (Eastern (EST))
  - Summer (DST): UTC-4 (EDT)
- Area code: 570
- FIPS code: 42-037-04704
- Website: beavertwppa.com

Beaver Township is a township in Columbia County, Pennsylvania. It is part of Northeastern Pennsylvania. The population was 879 at the 2020 census. Beaver Township is named for Beaver Run, a tributary of Catawissa Creek, both of which run through the township.

== History ==
Beaver Township was first settled in 1774 by Alexander McCauley. However, McCauley left the township in 1776, and the township was not settled again until 1799. In 1810, a tannery and sawmill were built in Beaver Township. Beaver Township was formed from Catawissa Township.

== Geography ==
Beaver Township is in southeastern Columbia County and is bordered to the east by Luzerne County and to the southeast by Schuylkill County. The northern border of the township follows the ridgecrest of Nescopeck Mountain. Other mountains in the township are McCauley Mountain in the center, the western end of Buck Mountain on the east side, and the slopes of Catawissa Mountain along the southwestern border.

According to the United States Census Bureau, the township has a total area of 35.8 square miles (92.7 km^{2}), of which 35.4 square miles (91.7 km^{2}) is land and 0.39 square miles (1.0 km^{2}), or 1.11%, is water. Catawissa Creek, a tributary of the Susquehanna River, flows from southeast to northwest across the southwestern side of the township.

Unincorporated communities in the township include Mifflin Cross Roads, Shumans, and Dogtown.

== Demographics ==
Historical population
Census	Pop.	Note	%±
2010	917		—
2020	879		−4.1%
2021 (est.)	886		0.8%
U.S. Decennial Census

As of the census of 2000, there were 885 people, 342 households, and 254 families residing in the township. The population density was 24.8 people per square mile (9.6/km^{2}). There were 437 housing units at an average density of 12.2/sq mi (4.7/km^{2}). The racial makeup of the township was 99.44% White, 0.11% Native American, 0.11% Asian, 0.11% from other races, and 0.23% from two or more races. Hispanic or Latino of any race were 0.11% of the population.

There were 342 households, out of which 28.1% had children under the age of 18 living with them, 62.9% were married couples living together, 7.3% had a female householder with no husband present, and 25.7% were non-families. 22.2% of all households were made up of individuals, and 7.6% had someone living alone who was 65 years of age or older. The average household size was 2.59 and the average family size was 3.05.

In the township the population was spread out, with 22.3% under the age of 18, 6.6% from 18 to 24, 28.9% from 25 to 44, 27.3% from 45 to 64, and 14.9% who were 65 years of age or older. The median age was 41 years. For every 100 females, there were 103.0 males. For every 100 females age 18 and over, there were 100.6 males.

The median income for a household in the township was $34,524, and the median income for a family was $39,231. Males had a median income of $30,227 versus $21,842 for females. The per capita income for the township was $15,225. About 4.1% of families and 7.5% of the population were below the poverty line, including 9.7% of those under age 18 and 7.1% of those age 65 or over.
