= Hair grass =

Hair grass is a common name for several plants and can refer to:

- Agrostis hyemalis (winter bentgrass, ticklegrass)
- Agrostis scabra, "hair grass" (rough bent grass, winter bent grass, ticklegrass)
- Aira, hairgrass
- Aira caryophyllea, silver hairgrass
- Aira praecox, early hair grass
- Corynephorus canescens, grey hair-grass
- Deschampsia, hair grass
- Eleocharis acicularis, dwarf hairgrass
- Eleocharis parvula, "hairgrass" (dwarf spikerush, small spikerush)
- Koeleria glauca, Blue Hair Grass
- Koeleria macrantha, crested hair grass
- Koeleria vallesiana, Somerset hair grass
- Rostraria cristata, Mediterranean hair grass
