= Nescopeck Township, Pennsylvania =

Township in Pennsylvania, US

Coordinates: 41°02′00″N 76°09′59″W

- Township
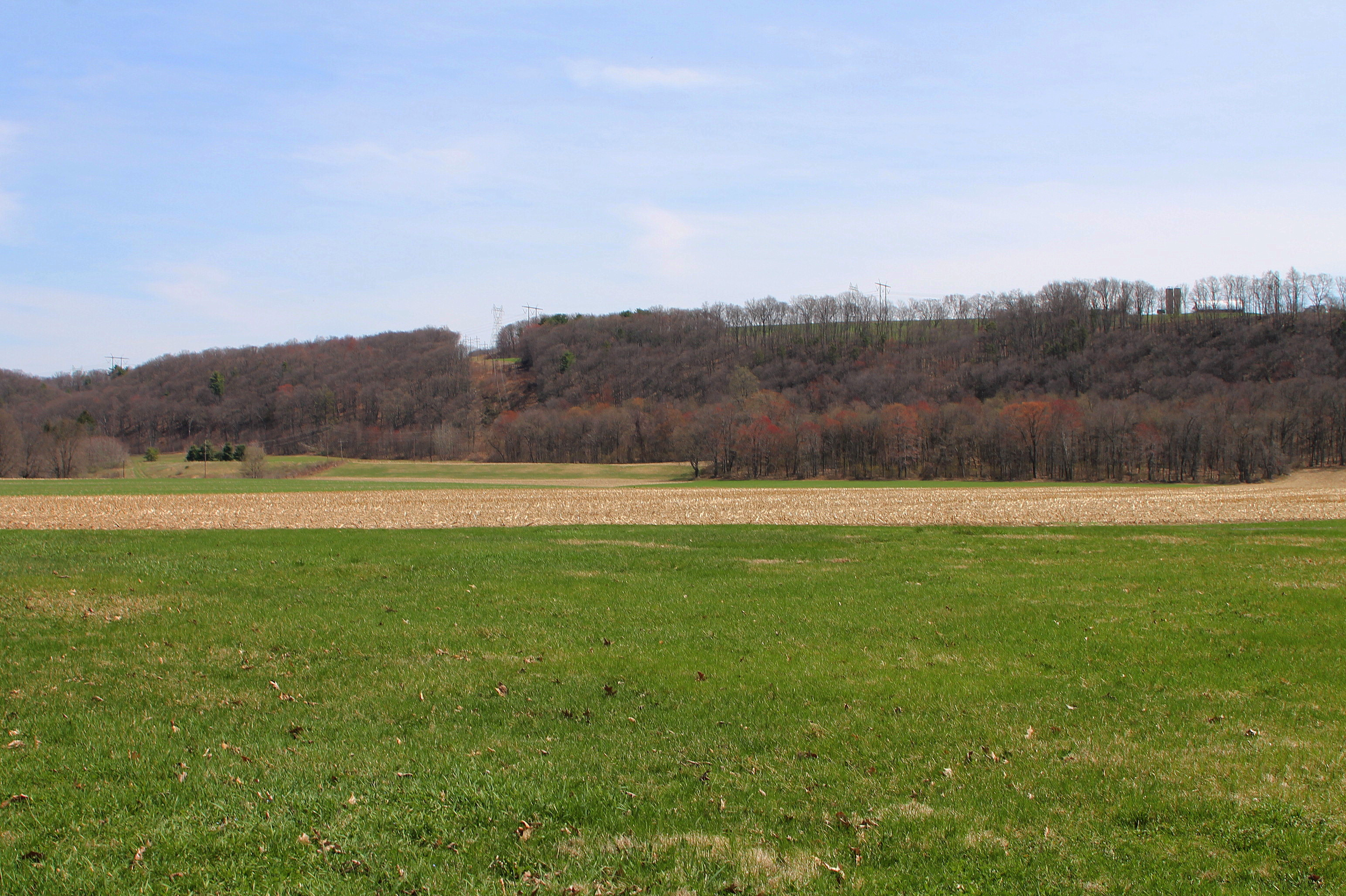
- Scenery of Nescopeck Township

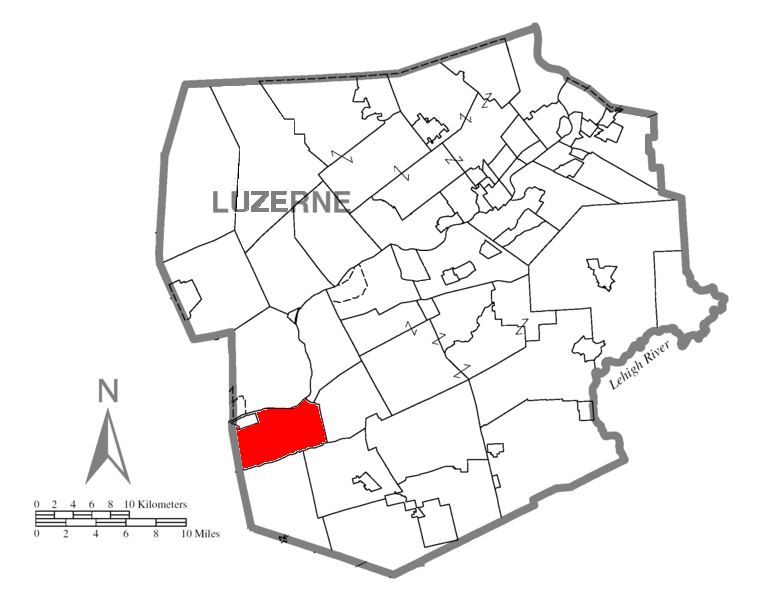
- Map of Luzerne County highlighting Nescopeck Township

- Map of Pennsylvania highlighting Luzerne County
- Country: United States
- State: Pennsylvania
- County: Luzerne

Area
  - Total: 18.66 sq mi (48.33 km^{2})
  - Land: 17.98 sq mi (46.58 km^{2})
  - Water: 0.68 sq mi (1.75 km^{2})

Population (2020)
  - Total: 1,080 ▼
  - Estimate (2021): 1,088
  - Density: 64.3/sq mi (24.82/km^{2})
- Time zone: UTC-5 (Eastern (EST))
  - Summer (DST): UTC-4 (EDT)
- FIPS code: 42-079-52992
- Website: nescopecktwp.org

Nescopeck Township is a township in Luzerne County, Pennsylvania, United States. As of the 2020 census, the township population was 1,080.

== History ==
It is believed that the first white settler in what is now Nescopeck Township was George Walker (in 1786). The early settlers were frequently harassed by Native Americans. Nescopeck Township was formed from a section of Newport Township in 1792. The largest hamlet in the township, which is now the Borough of Nescopeck, was established on the site of a former Delaware settlement (which was a rendezvous for the Native Americans during the French and Indian War). The first church was erected in 1811.

== Geography ==
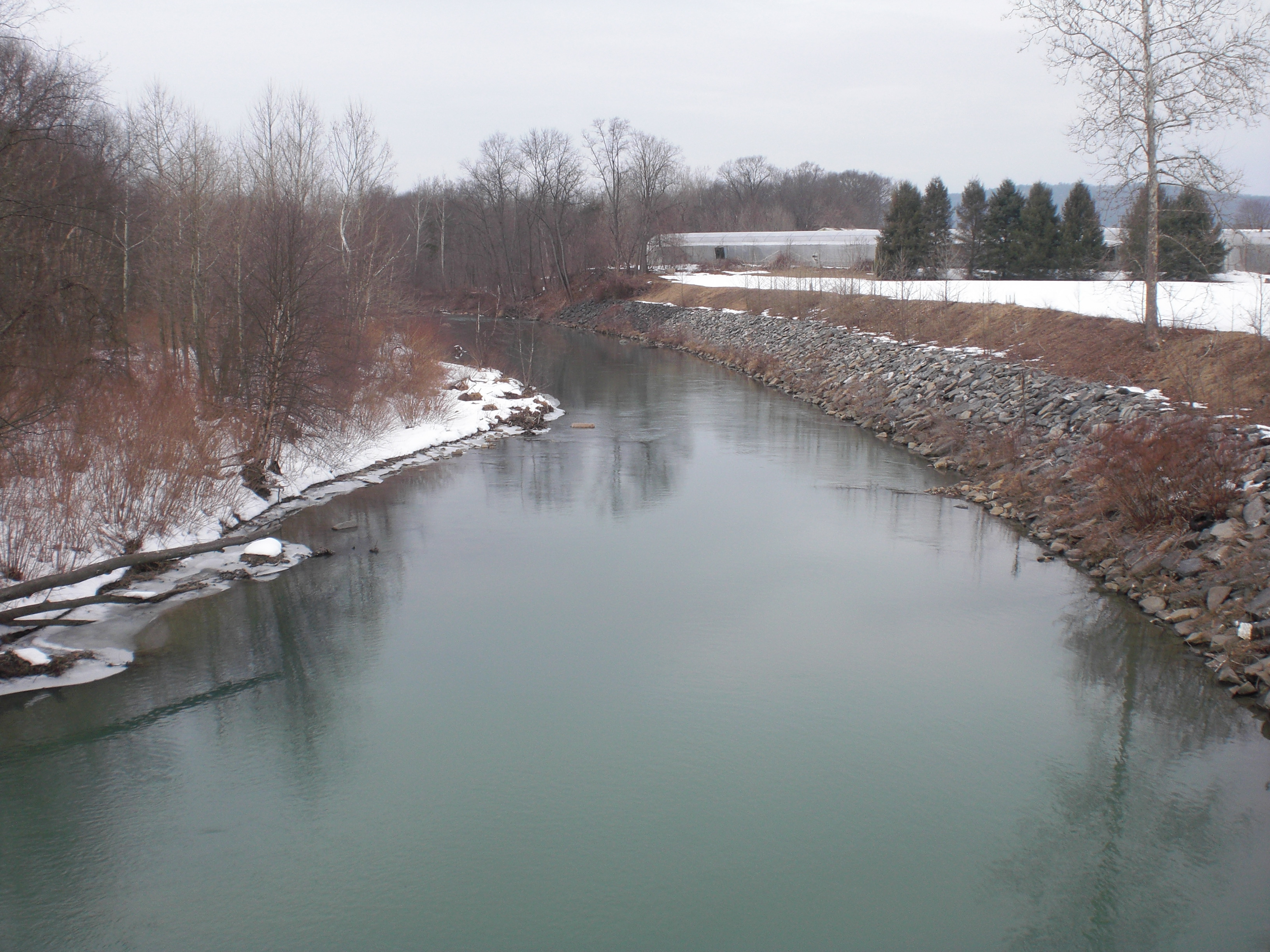
Nescopeck Creek from the PA 339 bridge

According to the United States Census Bureau, the township has a total area of 18.6 square miles (48.3 km^{2}), of which 18.0 square miles (46.6 km^{2}) is land and 0.66 square miles (1.7 km^{2}), or 3.62%, is water. The majority of the community is farmland. The Susquehanna River defines the northern border of the township. Nescopeck Mountain, a forested ridge, defines the southern border of the municipality. Nescopeck Creek flows through the western half of the township. Briggsville and Zenith are two small farming communities located within the interior of the township. The municipality's number routes include I-80, PA 93, PA 239, and PA 339.

=== Climate ===
On average, the warmest month is July. The highest recorded temperature was 103 °F in 1988 and 2006. On average, the coldest month is January. The lowest recorded temperature was -18 °F in 1984 and 2008. The most precipitation on average occurs in June. The township has a humid continental climate (Dfa/Dfb).

== Demographics ==
Historical population
Census	Pop.	Note	%±
2000	1,096		—
2010	1,155		5.4%
2020	1,080		−6.5%
2021 (est.)	1,088		0.7%
U.S. Decennial Census

At the 2000 census there were 1,096 people, 414 households, and 337 families living in the township. The population density was 60.6 inhabitants per square mile (23.4/km^{2}). There were 459 housing units at an average density of 25.4/sq mi (9.8/km^{2}). The racial makeup of the township was 98.18% White, 0.18% Native American, 0.18% Asian, 0.36% Pacific Islander, 0.46% from other races, and 0.64% from two or more races. Hispanic or Latino of any race were 0.46%.

There were 414 households, 33.6% had children under the age of 18 living with them, 71.3% were married couples living together, 5.1% had a female householder with no husband present, and 18.4% were non-families. 15.7% of households were made up of individuals, and 6.3% were one person aged 65 or older. The average household size was 2.65 and the average family size was 2.94.

The age distribution was 24.0% under the age of 18, 5.9% from 18 to 24, 29.7% from 25 to 44, 26.8% from 45 to 64, and 13.5% 65 or older. The median age was 40 years. For every 100 females, there were 98.2 males. For every 100 females age 18 and over, there were 100.2 males.

The median household income was $43,125 and the median family income was $45,655. Males had a median income of $32,250 versus $21,800 for females. The per capita income for the township was $17,918. About 6.2% of families and 8.8% of the population were below the poverty line, including 13.1% of those under age 18 and 13.0% of those age 65 or over.

== Culture ==
- The Briggs Farm Festival is held in Nescopeck Township every summer (usually in the beginning of July).
- An annual consignment sale is held at the township fire hall every year in April to help raise money for the fire department.

== Gallery ==
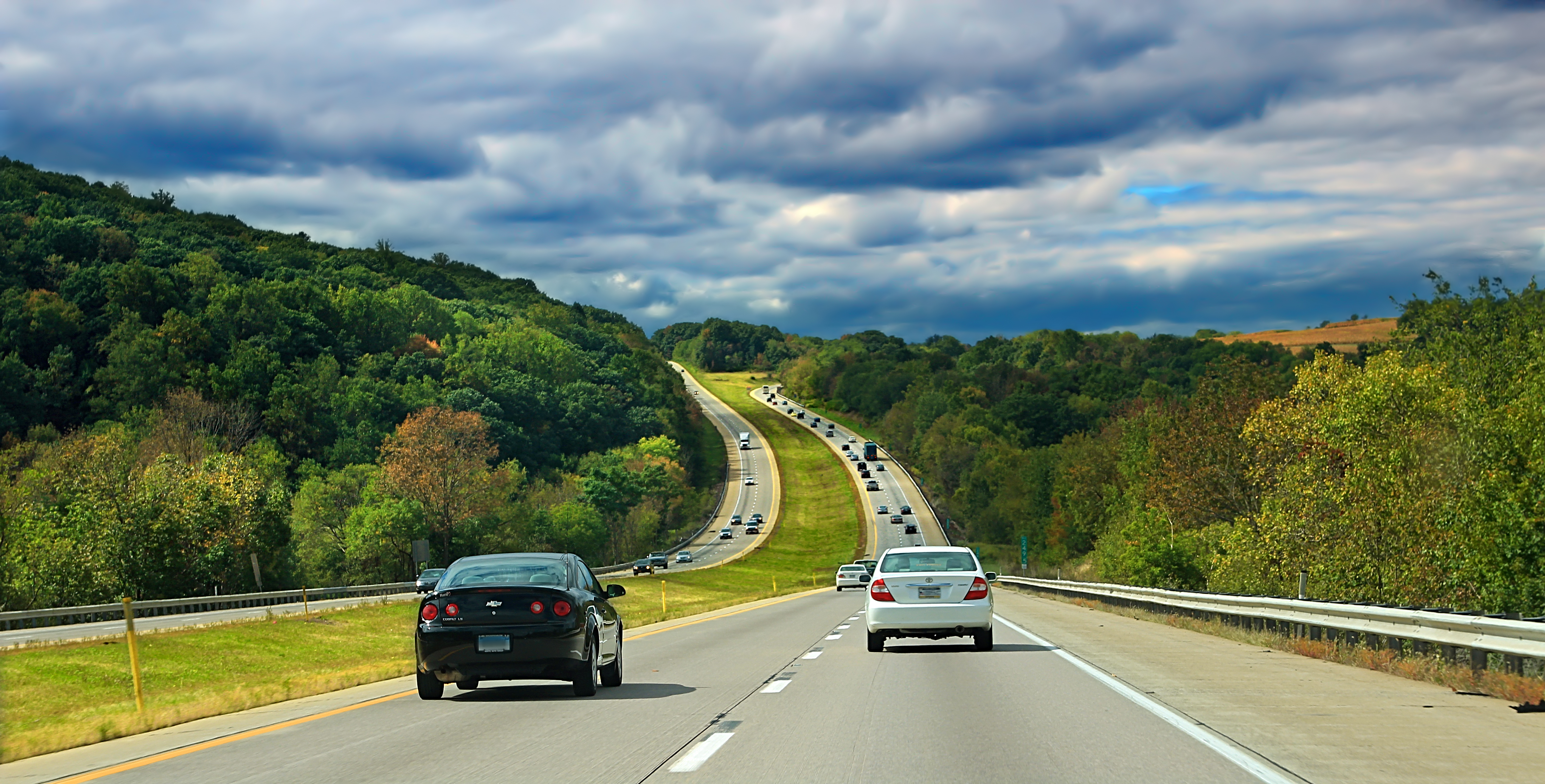
I-80 in Nescopeck Township

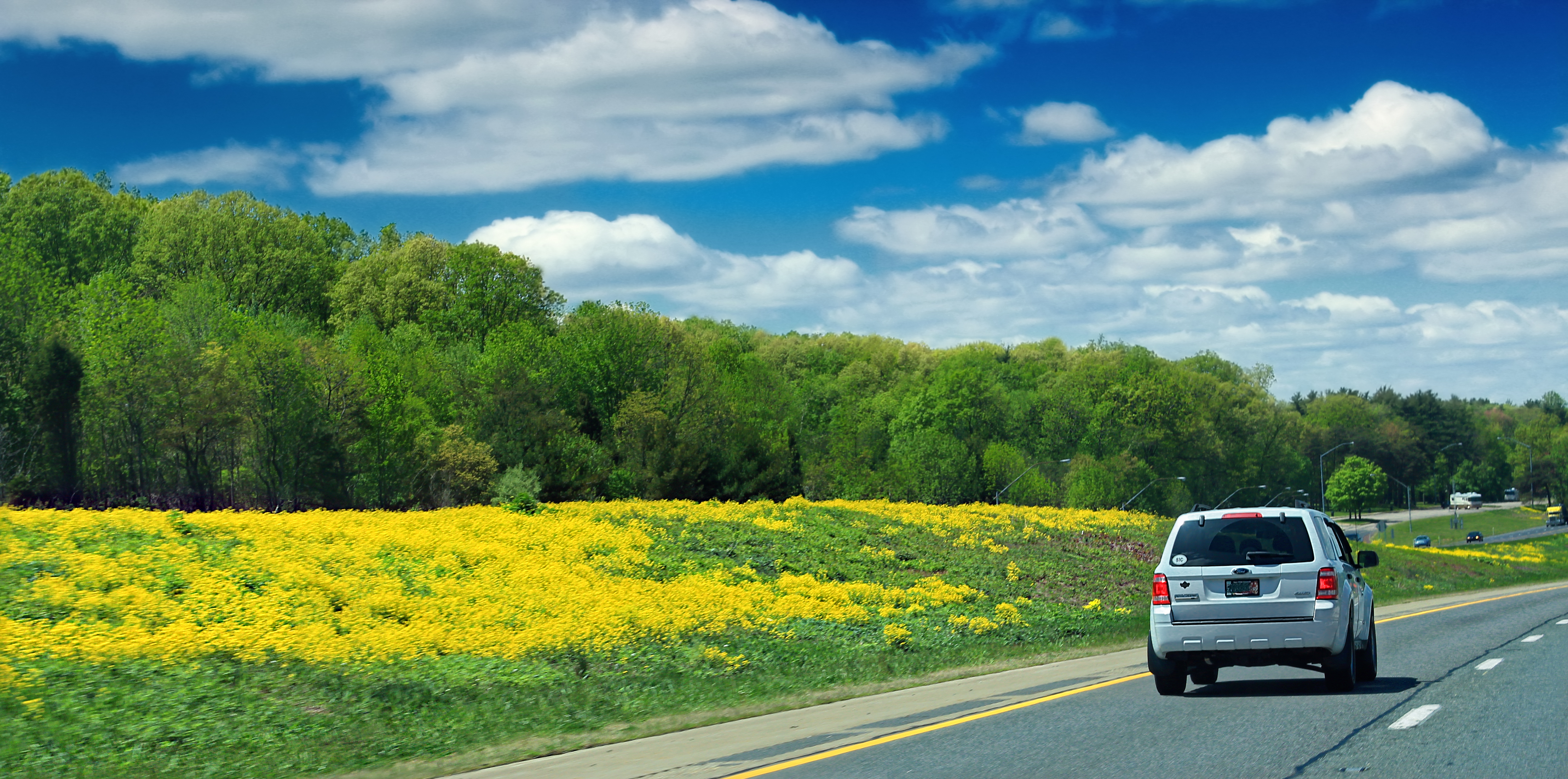
I-80 in the township

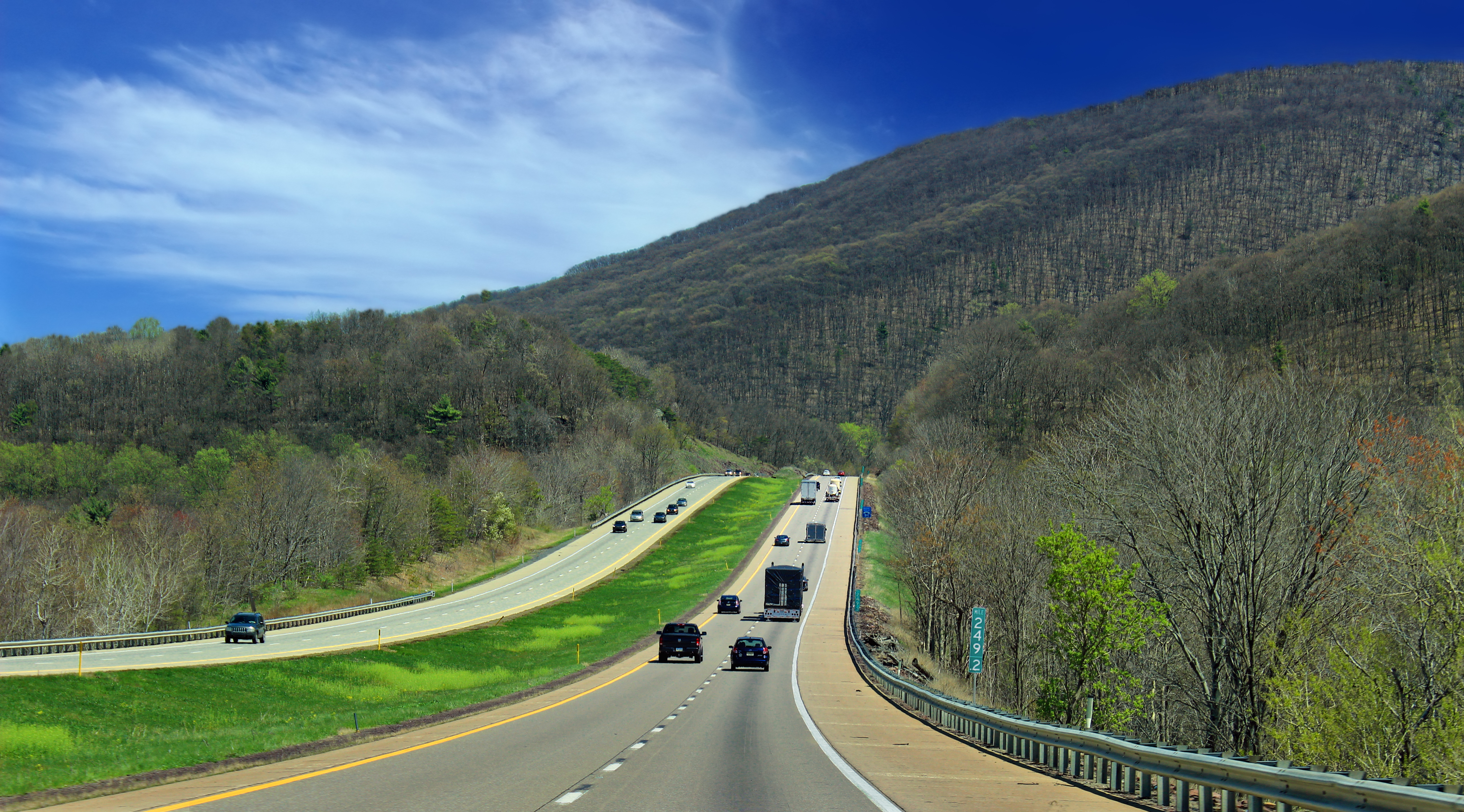
I-80 in the township (Nescopeck Mountain rises in the distance)
