= Pennsylvania Route 424 =

State highway in Luzerne County, Pennsylvania, US

Pennsylvania Route 424
- Greater Hazleton Chamber Of Commerce Beltway; Arthur Gardner Highway

Route information
- Maintained by PennDOT
- Length: 3.749 mi (6.033 km)
- Existed: 2000–present

Major junctions
- West end: I-81 in Hazle Township
- PA 309 near Hazleton
- East end: PA 93 near Hazleton

Location
- Country: United States
- State: Pennsylvania
- Counties: Luzerne

Highway system
- Pennsylvania State Route System; Interstate; US; State; Scenic; Legislative
← PA 423	→ PA 425

Pennsylvania Route 424 (PA 424) is a 3.75-mile-long (6.04 km) state highway located in northeastern Pennsylvania. The western terminus is at Interstate 81 (I-81) exit 141 in Hazle Township. The eastern terminus is at PA 93 on the southeastern edge of Hazleton. The highway is called the Greater Hazleton Chamber Of Commerce Beltway or Arthur Gardner Highway and is a two-lane undivided road that forms a southern bypass of the city of Hazleton in Luzerne County, with an intermediate intersection with PA 309. The section of the road between PA 309 and PA 93 was constructed by 1980 and became State Route 3032 (SR 3032). The road was extended west to I-81 in 1999, and PA 424 was designated between I-81 and PA 93 in 2000. PA 424 was constructed to provide access to the Hazleton Commerce Center and to reduce truck traffic on adjacent roads. There are plans to extend the route west to PA 924 near Humboldt Industrial Park.

== Route description ==
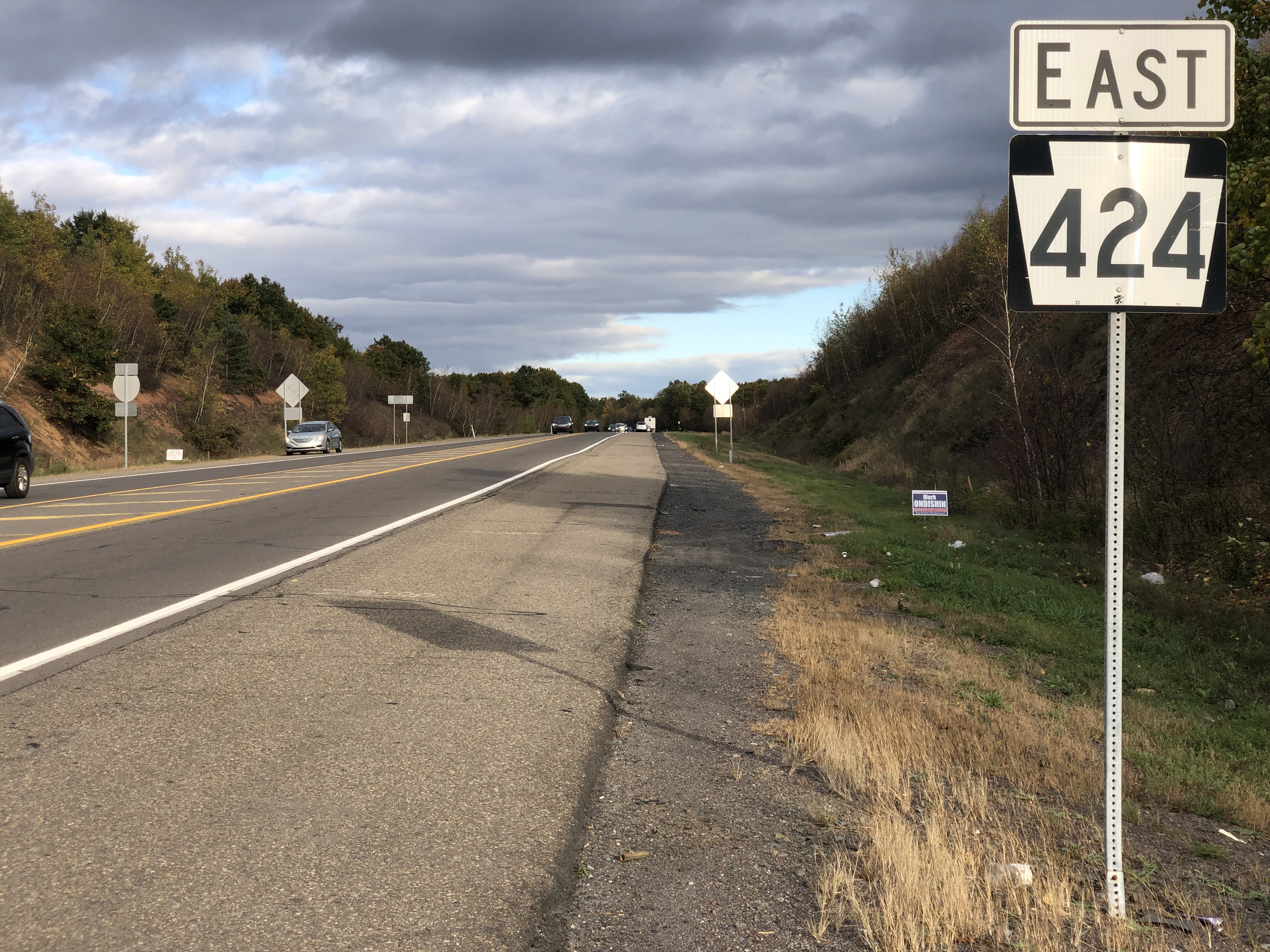
PA 424 eastbound past I-81 in Hazle Township

PA 424 begins at a diamond interchange with I-81 in Hazle Township. The route heads east as a two-lane undivided road called the Greater Hazleton Chamber Of Commerce Beltway or Arthur Gardner Highway, passing through forested areas. The road turns northeast and comes to an intersection with PA 309, briefly becoming a divided highway at this point. Past PA 309, PA 424 crosses a Reading Blue Mountain and Northern Railroad line and heads into the southern part of the city of Hazleton, continuing east. The route passes through more woodland along with a few industrial establishments, running to the north of a coal mine. The roadway briefly becomes divided again as it crosses Poplar Street. PA 424 continues east and enters Hazle Township again, reaching its eastern terminus at PA 93.

== History ==
The first section of the road to be built was between PA 309 and PA 93, which was constructed by 1980. With the establishment of the Location Referencing System for state roads in 1987, this road was designated as SR 3032. The rest of the road between I-81 and PA 309 was built in the late 1990s and opened to traffic in December 1999. The entire length of the road between I-81 and PA 93 was designated PA 424 in 2000. The highway was built to provide access between I-81 and the Hazleton Commerce Center and to reduce truck traffic on local roads in the Hazleton area. The project cost $10.25 million. This road was one of the four legs of a proposed beltway system to encircle Hazleton. In 2003, PA 424 was renamed from the Hazleton South Beltway to the Greater Hazleton Chamber of Commerce Beltway.

Plans exist for the road to be extended west to PA 924 in the Humboldt Industrial Park. In 2010, the Greater Hazleton Chamber of Commerce pushed for the extension in order to provide economic development to the region. The state provided funding for this extension in the transportation bill in 2013. Construction on the extension of PA 424 began in April 2020, with completion expected in October 2024.

== Major intersections ==
The entire route is in Luzerne County.

Location	mi	km	Destinations	Notes
Hazle Township	0.000	0.000	I-81 – Harrisburg, Wilkes-Barre	Western terminus; exit 141 on I-81
Hazle Township	1.144	1.841	PA 309 (South Church Street) – Hazleton, McAdoo	
No major junctions in Hazleton
Hazle Township	3.749	6.033	PA 93 (East Broad Street/New Coxesville Road)	Eastern terminus
1.000 mi = 1.609 km; 1.000 km = 0.621 mi
