= Pennsylvania Route 339 =

State highway in Pennsylvania, US

Pennsylvania Route 339

Route information
- Maintained by PennDOT
- Length: 32.840 mi (52.851 km)
- Existed: 1928–present

Major junctions
- South end: PA 54 in Mahanoy City
- PA 924 in East Union Township; I-80 in Mifflin Township
- North end: PA 93 in Nescopeck

Location
- Country: United States
- State: Pennsylvania
- Counties: Schuylkill, Columbia, Luzerne

Highway system
- Pennsylvania State Route System; Interstate; US; State; Scenic; Legislative
← PA 338	→ PA 340

Pennsylvania Route 339 (PA 339) is a 32.8-mile-long (52.8 km) north–south state highway located in Schuylkill, Columbia, and Luzerne counties in Pennsylvania. The southern terminus is at PA 54 in Mahanoy City. The northern terminus is at PA 93 in Nescopeck. The route is a two-lane road that passes through mountainous areas in the eastern part of the state. PA 339 runs north through the Coal Region to Brandonville, where it heads northwest to follow the Catawissa Creek to Mainville. From Mainville, the route passes through farmland to Mifflinville, where it follows the Susquehanna River to Nescopeck. PA 339 forms a concurrency with PA 924 in Brandonville and has an interchange with Interstate 80 (I-80) in Mifflinville.

PA 339 was designated in 1928 to run from U.S. Route 11 (US 11) in Bloomsburg north to PA 115 in Coles Creek. PA 342 was designated onto the stretch of road between the border of Schuylkill and Columbia counties and Mainville. The northern terminus of PA 339 was cut back to PA 115 (now PA 254) south of Benton in the 1930s, with PA 115 replacing the route north of there. PA 342 was extended southeast to PA 45 (now PA 54) in Mahanoy City in the 1930s. In the 1940s, a southern extension of PA 44 replaced PA 342. In the 1960s, PA 339 was shifted to its current alignment. PA 339 replaced the section of PA 44 between Mahanoy City and Mainville while a southern extension of PA 487 replaced the former PA 339 between Bloomsburg and Benton.

== Route description ==
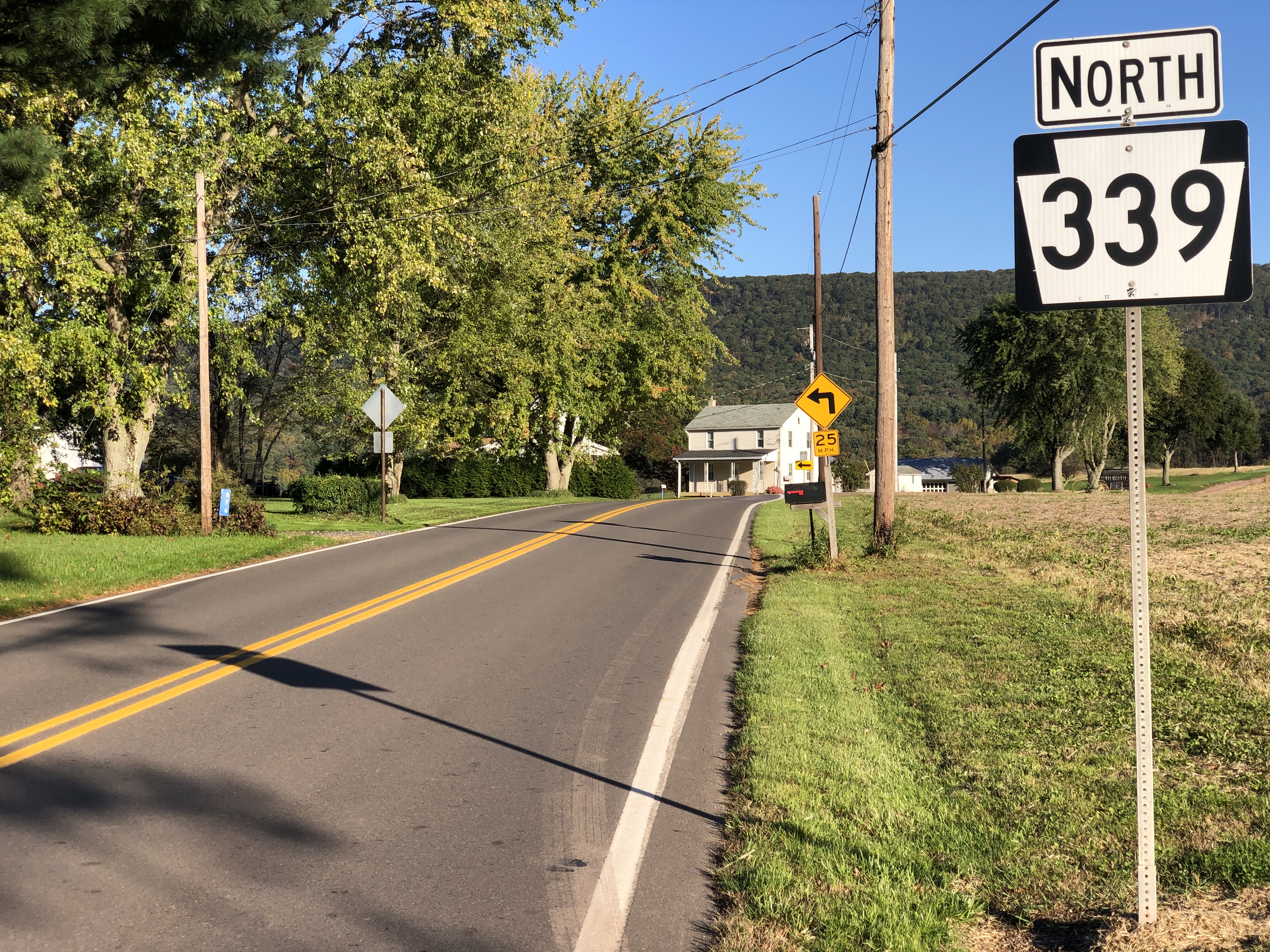
PA 339 northbound in Beaver Township

PA 339 begins at an intersection with PA 54 in the downtown area of the borough of Mahanoy City in Schuylkill County, heading north on two-lane undivided North Main Street. The road soon passes under a Reading Blue Mountain and Northern Railroad line and runs past homes and businesses. The route turns west onto Brandonville Road and crosses into Mahanoy Township, passing through woods and the Terrace Hills before it curves north and passes west of a coal mine. PA 339 continues through forests and traverses a ridge, where it passes near a wind farm. The road makes a sharp turn west to descend the ridge, entering East Union Township and coming to an intersection with PA 924. At this point, the two routes head north for a concurrency on Main Boulevard and pass through residential areas in Brandonville. PA 339 splits from PA 924 by turning west onto Rattlin Run Road, running through farmland before passing through woods. The route heads into Union Township turns north onto Creek Road, crossing the Catawissa Creek back into East Union Township. The road heads northwest through woodland with some fields parallel to the creek, entering North Union Township. PA 339 continues north along Catawissa Creek Road through farmland with some trees, passing through Zion Grove and crossing the Catawissa Creek. The road winds northwest through rural areas parallel to the creek, crossing it for a third time and turning north.

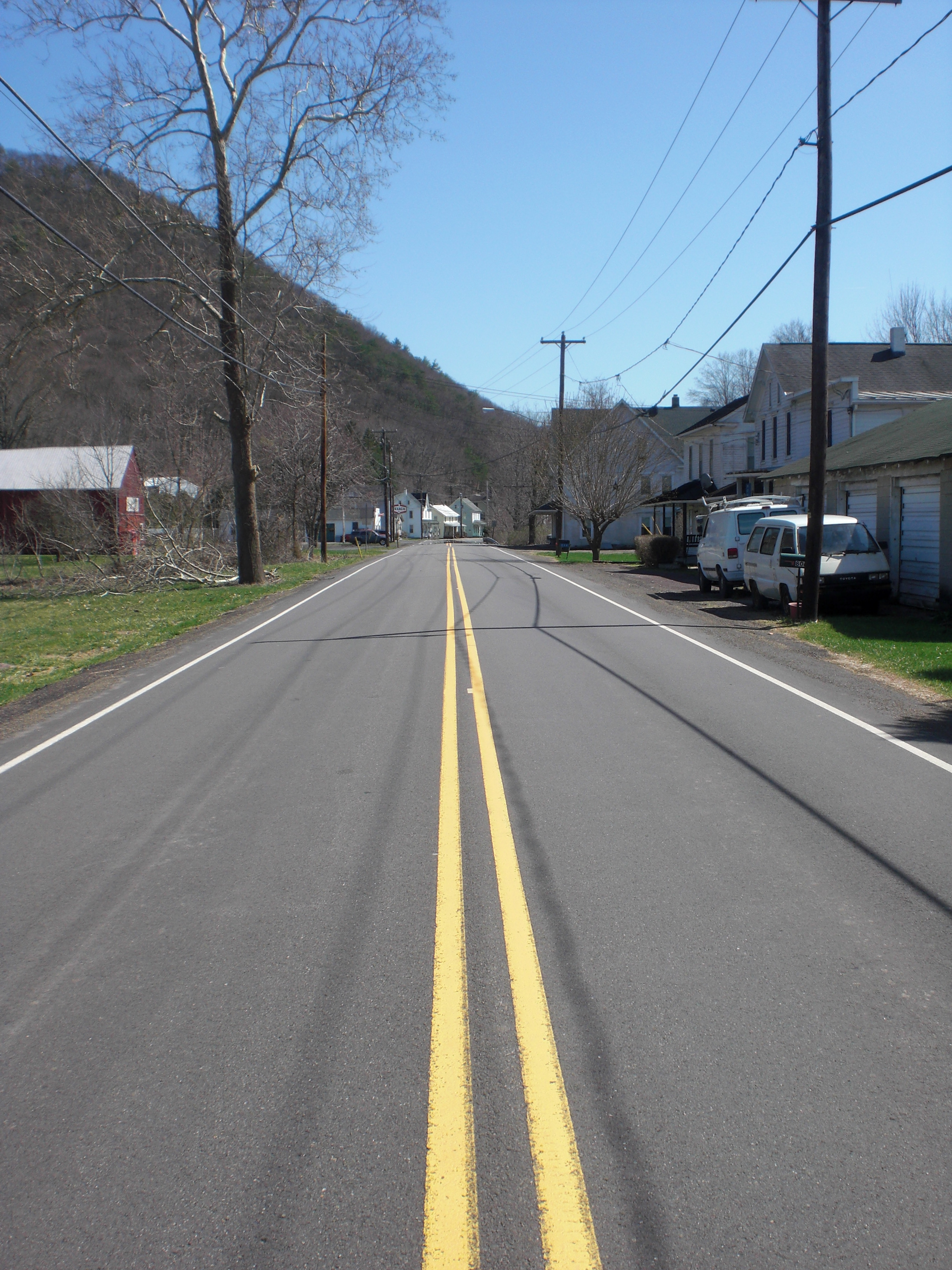
PA 339 in Mainville

PA 339 heads into Beaver Township in Columbia County and becomes State Road, curving northwest and passing through a mix of fields and woods with some homes. The road heads west before it turns north again through more rural areas. The route bends back to the west and passes through Shumans before crossing the Catawissa Creek. PA 339 heads through forested areas with some fields to the south of the creek, crossing it once more. The road turns northwest and runs parallel to the Catawissa Creek through rural areas, heading into Main Township and becoming Mainville Drive. The route winds northwest before it and the creek turn to the north and pass through a forested gap between Catawissa Mountain to the west and Nescopeck Mountain to the east.

PA 339 reaches Mainville, where it passes homes and turns northeast onto Main-Mifflin Road. The road runs through agricultural areas with some trees and homes to the northwest of Nescopeck Mountain. The route heads into Mifflin Township and curves to the north, reaching an interchange with I-80 in a business area. Past this interchange, PA 339 heads northeast into Mifflinville along West 3rd Street, passing homes. The road crosses Market Street and continues through Mifflinville along East 3rd Street. The route leaves Mifflinville and becomes Mifflin Nescopeck Highway, running between farmland to the south and Norfolk Southern's Sunbury Line and the Susquehanna River parallel to the north. PA 339 bends northeast and crosses the railroad tracks, continuing through farmland and woodland with the Norfolk Southern line parallel to the south and the river further north. The road enters Nescopeck Township in Luzerne County and becomes Mifflin Road, passing through more rural land before crossing the Nescopeck Creek into the borough of Nescopeck. The route turns north onto Broad Street and passes through residential areas before it reaches its northern terminus at an intersection with PA 93.

== History ==
When Pennsylvania first legislated routes in 1911, what would become PA 339 between Bloomsburg and Coles Creek was designated as part of Legislative Route 16. PA 339 was designated in 1928 to run from US 11 in Bloomsburg north to PA 115 at the present-day intersection of PA 487 and Camp Lavigne Road in Coles Creek. At this time, the route was paved between Bloomsburg and PA 93 in Orangeville, along a short stretch near Stillwater, and between PA 439 (now PA 254) south of Benton and south of Coles Creek, while the remainder was unpaved. PA 342 was designated in 1928 along the stretch of present-day PA 339 between the border of Schuylkill and Columbia counties and Mainville, which was unpaved. From Mainville, PA 342 continued northwest to Bloomsburg and Jerseytown. By 1930, PA 339 was paved for a short stretch north of Orangeville and between Stillwater and PA 439 south of Benton while the route was under construction between north of Orangeville and Stillwater. By this time, the present-day route between Brandonville and the border of Schuylkill and Columbia counties was an unnumbered, unpaved road, while the road between Mainville and Nescopeck was unpaved with a small paved stretch near Mifflinville. In the 1930s, the northern terminus of PA 339 was cut back to PA 115 (which replaced PA 439) south of Benton, with a rerouted PA 115 replacing the route north of there. The entire length of PA 339 was paved in the 1930s. In addition, PA 342 was extended south to PA 45 (now PA 54) in Mahanoy City along a paved road, while the stretch of PA 342 northwest to Mainville was paved. The unnumbered road between Mainville and east of Mifflinville was also paved.

In the 1940s, PA 342 was replaced with a southern extension of PA 44, with the southern terminus of PA 44 located at PA 45 in Mahanoy City. The road between Mifflinville and Nescopeck was paved in the 1950s. In the 1960s, PA 339 was shifted to its current alignment between PA 54 in Mahanoy City and PA 93 in Nescopeck. The route replaced the section of PA 44 between Mahanoy City and Mainville while a southern extension of PA 487 replaced the former alignment of PA 339 between Bloomsburg and Benton.

== Major intersections ==
County	Location	mi	km	Destinations	Notes
Schuylkill	Mahanoy City	0.000	0.000	PA 54 (Centre Street) to I-81 – Hometown, Shenandoah	Southern terminus
Schuylkill	East Union Township	4.388	7.062	PA 924 south – Shenandoah	South end of PA 924 concurrency
Schuylkill	East Union Township	5.014	8.069	PA 924 north – Hazleton	North end of PA 924 concurrency
Columbia	Mifflin Township	26.864– 26.890	43.233– 43.275	I-80 – Hazleton, Bloomsburg	Exit 242 (I-80); diamond interchange
Luzerne	Nescopeck	32.840	52.851	PA 93 (3rd Street)	Northern terminus
1.000 mi = 1.609 km; 1.000 km = 0.621 mi: Concurrency terminus
