= Zenith, Pennsylvania =

Unincorporated community in Pennsylvania, US

- Unincorporated community
- Location within Pennsylvania Location within the United States
- Coordinates: 41°01′50″N 76°11′20″W
- Country: United States
- State: Pennsylvania
- County: Luzerne
- Township: Nescopeck
- Elevation: 564 ft (172 m)
- Time zone: UTC-5 (Eastern (EST))
  - Summer (DST): UTC-4 (EDT)
- Area code: 570
- GNIS feature ID: 1205011

Zenith is an unincorporated community in Nescopeck Township, Luzerne County, Pennsylvania, United States.
