= Pennsylvania Route 93 =

State highway in Pennsylvania, US

Pennsylvania Route 93
- PA 93 in red and PA 93 Truck in blue

Route information
- Maintained by PennDOT
- Length: 41.086 mi (66.122 km)

Major junctions
- South end: US 209 near Nesquehoning
- PA 424 near Hazleton; PA 309 in Hazleton; PA 924 in West Hazleton; I-81 near West Hazleton; I-80 in Sugarloaf Township; PA 239 near Nescopeck; PA 339 in Nescopeck; US 11 in Berwick
- North end: PA 487 in Orangeville

Location
- Country: United States
- State: Pennsylvania
- Counties: Carbon, Luzerne, Columbia

Highway system
- Pennsylvania State Route System; Interstate; US; State; Scenic; Legislative
← PA 92	→ PA 94

Pennsylvania Route 93 (PA 93) is a 41-mile-long (66 km) state route located in Carbon, Luzerne, and Columbia counties in northeastern Pennsylvania. The southern terminus is at U.S. Route 209 (US 209) in Nesquehoning, about halfway between the junction with PA 54 to just north of the 1800s community of Lausanne Landing, the southern toll station of the Lausanne & Nescopeck Turnpike (1804)—along whose path (east of the Susquehanna River) the highway was built. The northern terminus of the route is at PA 487 in Orangeville, the part of the road west of the Susquehanna and Berwick once being part of the Susquehanna & Tioga Turnpike (1806).

The route heads northwest as an undivided road from Nesquehoning through mountainous areas, passing through Beaver Meadows. The road reaches the city of Hazleton, where it passes through developed areas and crosses PA 309. PA 93 continues through West Hazleton and becomes a divided highway before it reaches an interchange with Interstate 81 (I-81). The road becomes undivided again and passes through Conyngham before coming to an interchange with I-80. PA 93 continues northwest and passes through Nescopeck before crossing the Susquehanna River into Berwick and forming a concurrency with US 11. The route continues west from Berwick through rural areas to Orangeville.

PA 93 was designated in 1927 between US 309/PA 22 in Hazleton and US 11/PA 19 in Berwick while US 309/PA 22 was designated onto the road between Nesquehoning and Hazleton. A year later, PA 93 was extended to PA 339 (now PA 487) in Orangeville and the PA 22 designation was removed from US 309. In the 1930s, the south end of PA 93 was truncated to PA 29 (now PA 239) southeast of Nescopeck, with PA 29 replacing the route southeast to Hazleton. PA 93 was extended north to PA 115 (now PA 254) in Rohrsburg in the 1940s. A realigned PA 29 replaced the US 309 designation between Nesquehoning and Hazleton in the 1950s. On May 9, 1966, PA 93 was extended southeast to US 209 in Nesquehoning, replacing that section of PA 29, while the north end was cut back to PA 487 in Orangeville in the 1960s.

== Route description ==
=== Carbon County ===
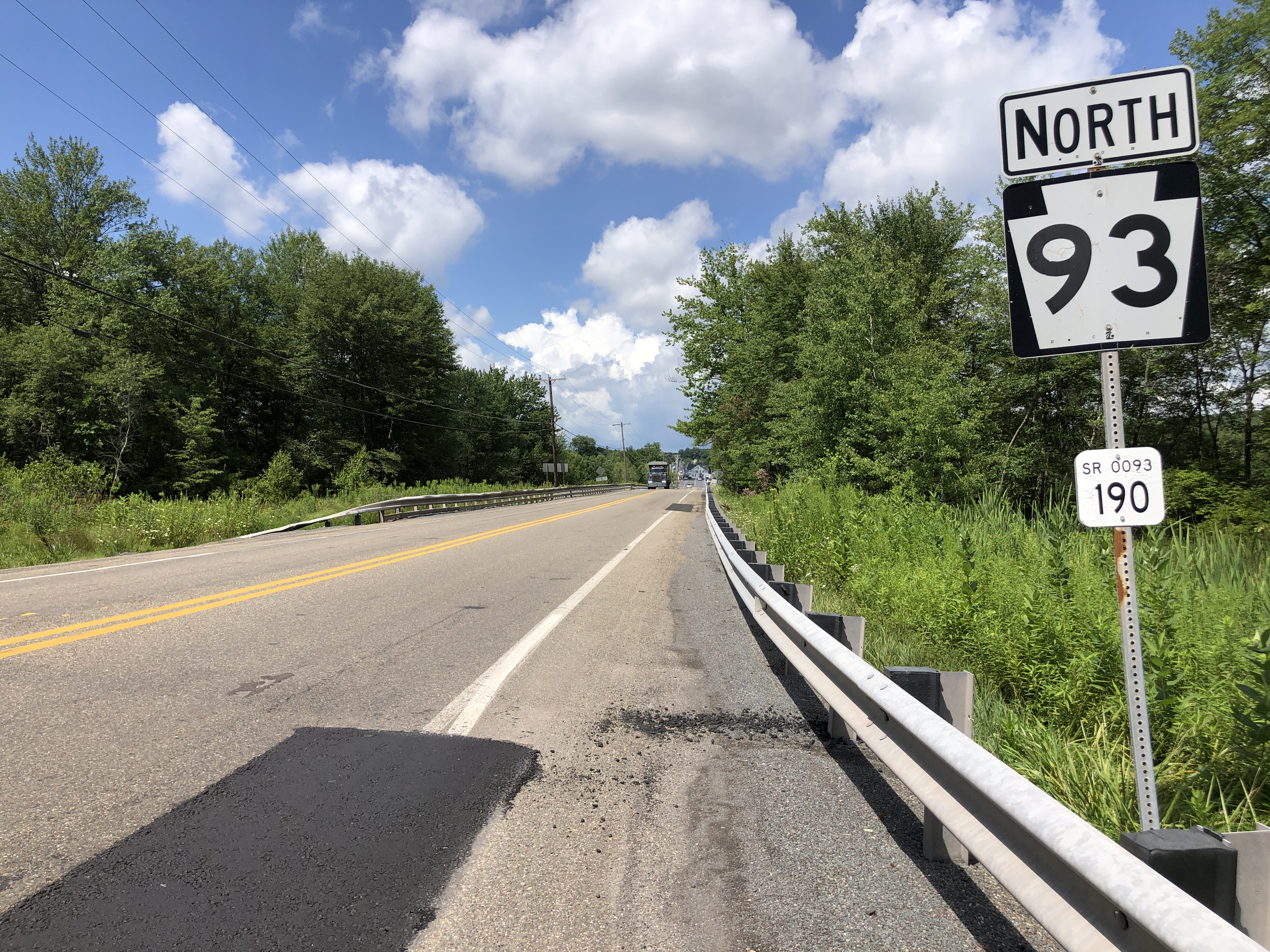
PA 93 northbound in Banks Township

PA 93 begins at an intersection with US 209 in the borough of Nesquehoning in Carbon County, heading north on two-lane undivided Hunter Street. The road passes over the Reading Blue Mountain and Northern Railroad's Reading Division line before it heads into forested areas. The route begins to ascend Broad Mountain, gaining a second northbound lane and curving northeast, where it comes to a southbound runaway truck ramp. PA 93 narrows back to two lanes and curves north and then west as it continues to climb the mountain. The road turns to the northwest and heads through dense forested areas on Broad Mountain, reaching a southbound truck brake check station. The route crosses into Packer Township and descends the mountain to reach the community of Hudsondale, where SR 4010 (Brenkman Drive) and SR 4006 (Packer Drive) both head northeast toward the borough of Weatherly. PA 93 heads through wooded areas with some fields and homes before it curves west and crosses forested Spring Mountain, where it enters Banks Township. After crossing the mountain, the road intersects SR 4006 (Spring Mountain Road), which heads east to Weatherly. The route heads into the borough of Beaver Meadows and becomes Broad Street, passing homes and a few businesses. PA 93 turns northwest onto Berwick Street and runs through more developed areas of the borough. The route leaves Beaver Meadows for Banks Township again and becomes Main Street, passing through wooded areas and the community of Coxes Village as it heads to the northeast of a coal mine.

=== Luzerne County ===
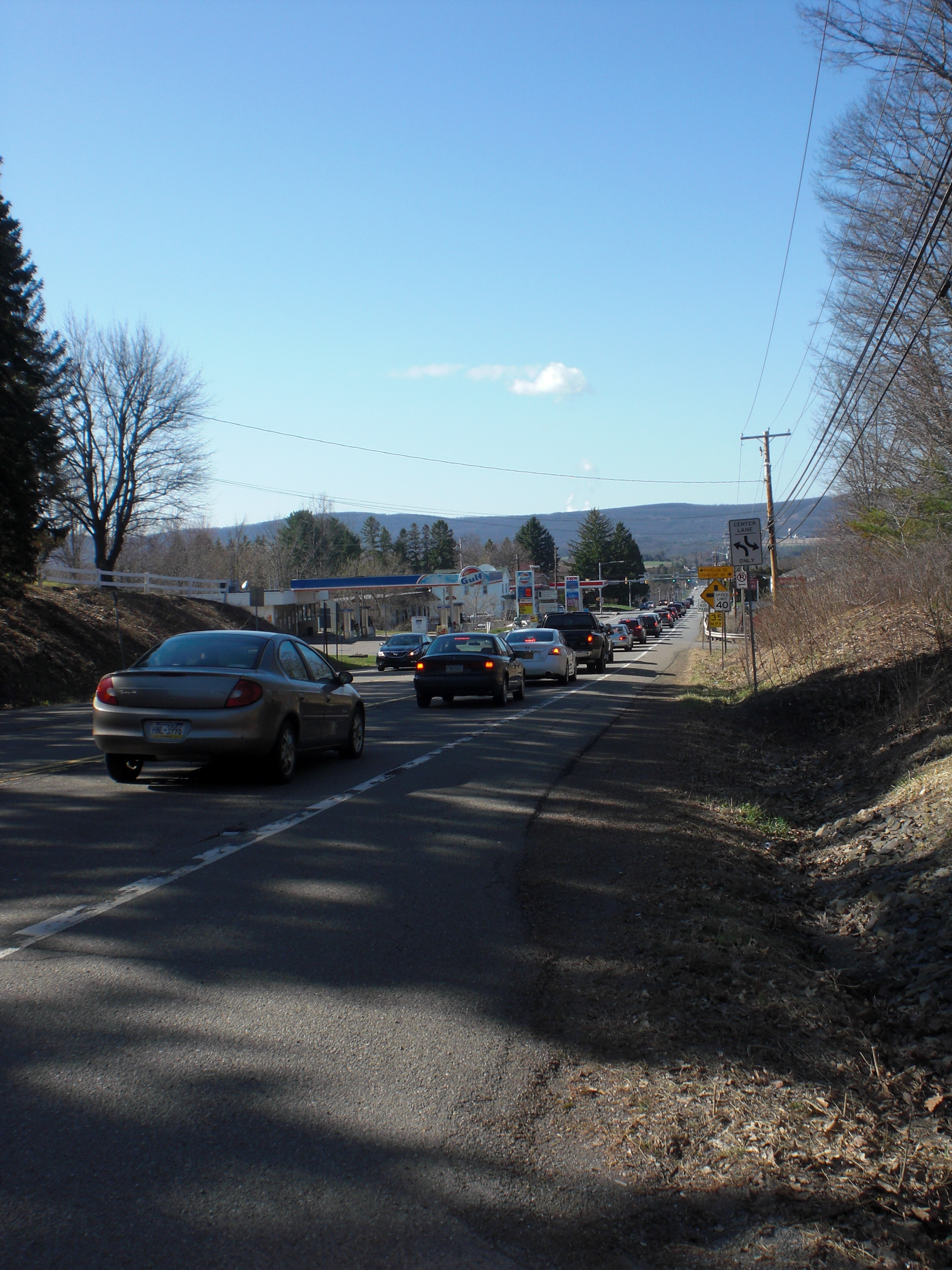
PA 93 in Conyngham

PA 93 enters Hazle Township in Luzerne County and continues past homes along Main Street. The road widens to a divided highway and comes to an intersection with the eastern terminus of PA 424, which serves as a southern bypass of the city of Hazleton. Past this intersection, the route enters the city of Hazleton and becomes East Broad Street, a three-lane road with a center left-turn lane. PA 93 heads northwest through residential areas before it passes to the northeast of Lehigh Valley Hospital–Hazleton. The road runs past homes and businesses, heading west-northwest and crossing Norfolk Southern's Hazleton Running Track. The route enters the commercial downtown of Hazleton and becomes a four-lane undivided road, with the name changing to West Broad Street at the Wyoming Street intersection. PA 93 comes to an intersection with PA 309 and leaves the downtown area, continuing past homes and businesses. The road passes to the north of a shopping center before it comes to a junction with PA 924. Here, PA 924 turns northwest to form a concurrency with PA 93 and the road enters the borough of West Hazleton as Broad Street, passing homes. The road turns to the north before PA 924 splits from PA 93 by heading east on two-lane Washington Avenue. PA 93 curves northwest and splits from Broad Street to become Susquehanna Boulevard, a five-lane road with a center left-turn lane. The road passes between shopping centers to the southwest and residential neighborhoods to the northeast before it becomes a four-lane divided highway and curves north into a wooded areas, becoming the border between West Hazleton to the west and Hazle Township to the east. The route fully enters Hazle Township and turns northwest, passing businesses and heading to the south of the Laurel Mall. PA 93 heads west and crosses into Sugarloaf Township, running past homes and businesses north of the Valmont Industrial Park. The road passes to the south of the Penn State Hazleton university campus before it comes to an interchange with I-81.

Past the I-81 interchange, the route becomes the Berwick-Hazleton Highway and passes through the community of Black Ridge. The road heads through forested areas and descends a hill as a three-lane road with one northbound lane and two southbound lanes. PA 93 becomes a three-lane road with a center left-turn lane and curves northwest, skirting the western border of the borough of Conyngham as it runs through a mix of fields and woods with some homes and businesses. The road passes through a portion of Conyngham before it heads back into Sugarloaf Township, narrowing to two lanes as it runs through a mix of farms and woods with some development and passes through the community of Sybertsville. The route crosses the Nescopeck Creek in a forested area and passes near more farms before it widens to a four-lane road as it has an interchange with I-80 in an area of businesses. Following this interchange, PA 93 becomes two lanes again and turns west to ascend forested Nescopeck Mountain. While crossing the mountain, the road passes through a corner of Hollenback Township before it enters Nescopeck Township. After descending the mountain, the route heads northwest into farmland with some woods and homes, intersecting the southern terminus of PA 239 near Briggsville. PA 93 continues through rural land with some development, curving to the west and entering the borough of Nescopeck. Here, the road becomes 3rd Street and runs west-southwest past homes and a few businesses, crossing Norfolk Southern's Sunbury Line. The route bends west and is lined with residences before it comes to a junction with the northern terminus of PA 339. The roadway passes through the commercial downtown of Nescopeck before heading back into residential areas and curving southwest into woods.

=== Columbia County ===
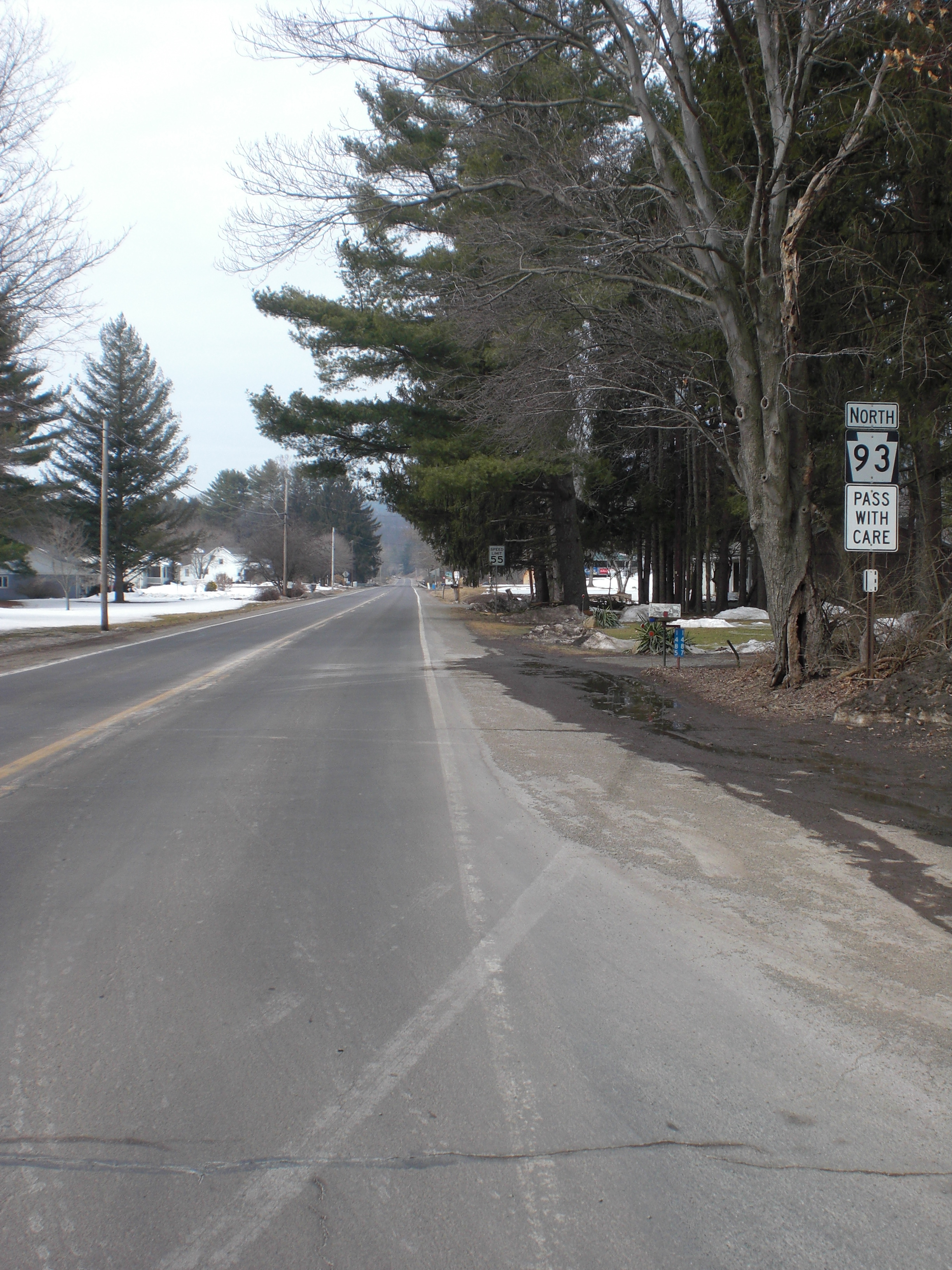
PA 93 in Briar Creek Township

PA 93 enters Mifflin Township in Columbia County and immediately turns northwest to enter Briar Creek Township and cross over the Susquehanna River near the mouth of Nescopeck Creek. Upon reaching the north bank of the river, the road enters the borough of Berwick and passes over the North Shore Railroad before heading off the bridge and into the commercial downtown on South Market Street. The route immediately intersects US 11 and turns southwest to form a wrong-way concurrency with that route on the one-way pair of West 2nd Street northbound and West Front Street southbound, with each street carrying two lanes of traffic. The streets pass through the downtown before running past a mix of homes and businesses. Both directions of US 11/PA 93 merge to head west on West Front Street, which has two northbound lanes and one southbound lane. A block later, PA 93 splits from US 11 by heading northwest onto two-lane undivided Orange Street, heading through residential areas. The route heads west out of Berwick into the northeast corner of the borough of Briar Creek, passing through farmland before turning northwest near a few homes. The road enters Briar Creek Township as an unnamed road and runs through a mix of residential areas, fields, and woods. PA 93 crosses into North Centre Township and bends southwest, running through a mix of farmland and woodland with some homes. The road passes through Fowlersville and curves to the north, passing through Whitmire. The route heads through wooded areas and curves to the northwest before turning west through a mix of farmland and trees with some homes. The roadway heads into forests and crosses into Orange Township. Farther west, PA 93 enters the borough of Orangeville and becomes Berwick Road, reaching its northern terminus at an intersection with PA 487 in a residential area.

== History ==
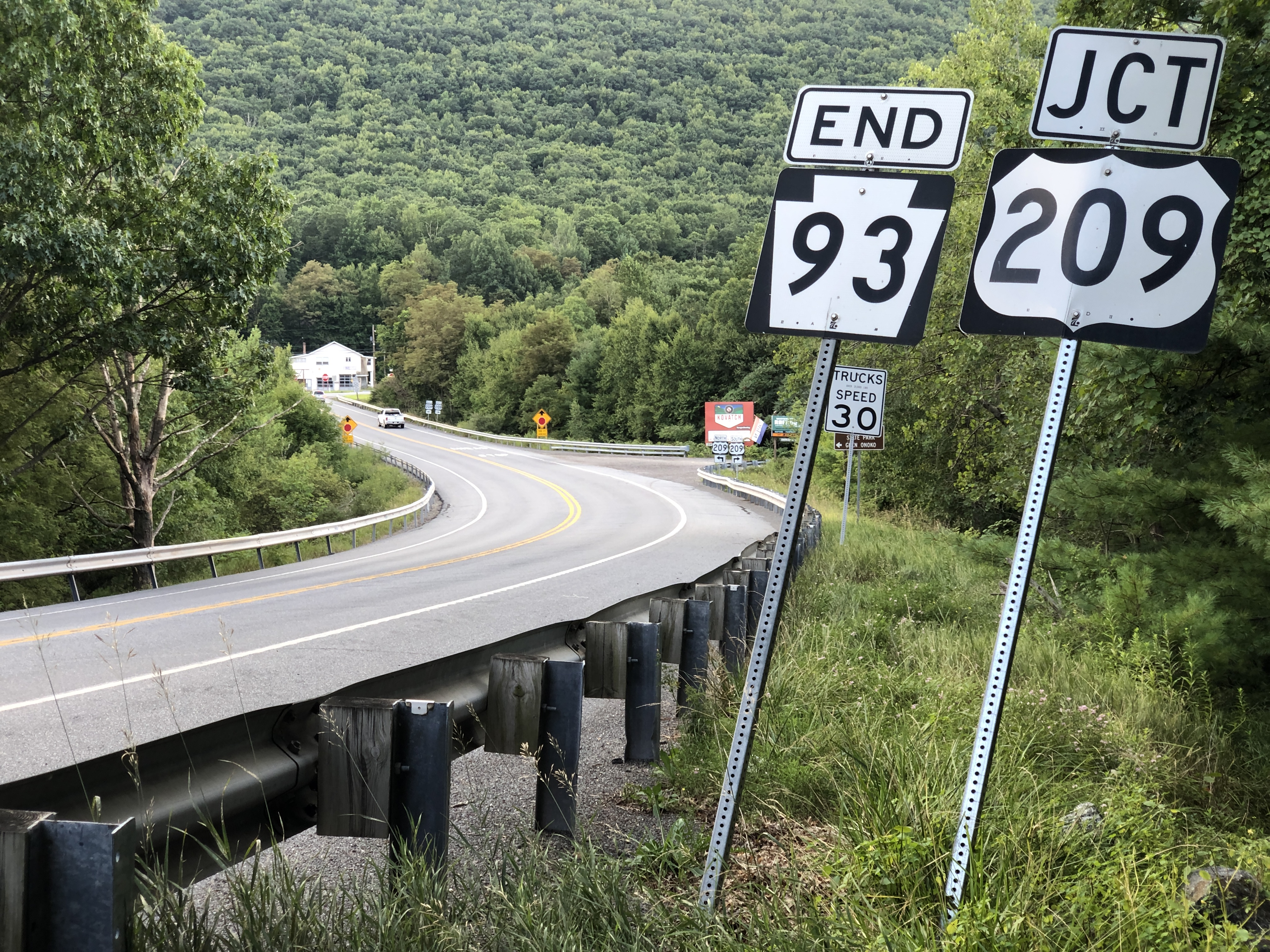
Approaching the southern terminus of PA 93 at US 209 near Nesquehoning

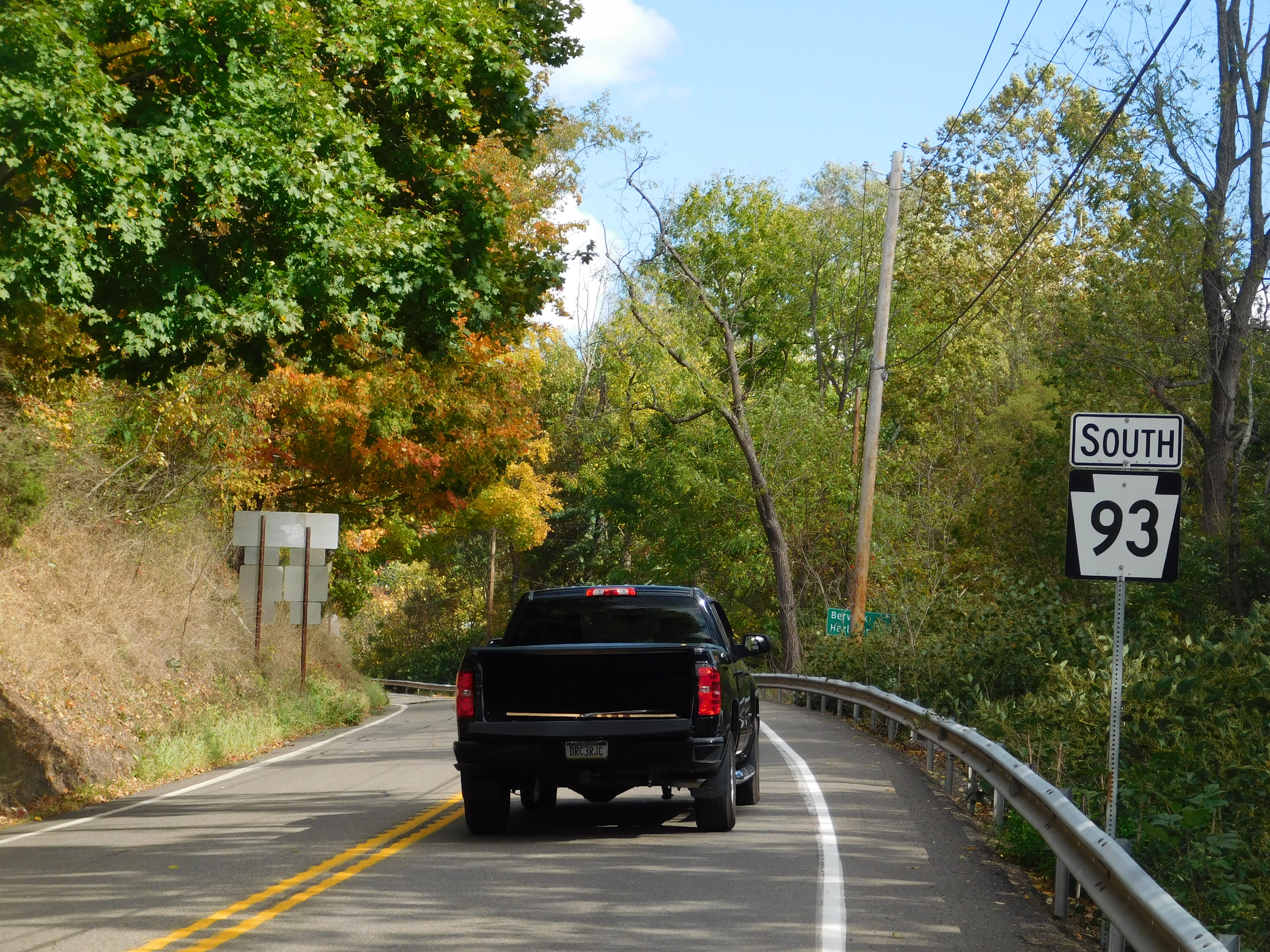
PA 93 southbound from PA 487 in Orangeville

When Pennsylvania first legislated routes in 1911, the present-day alignment of PA 93 was designated as part of Legislative Route 170 between Nesquehoning and Hudsondale and between Beaver Meadows and Hazleton and as part of Legislative Route 184 between Hazleton and Conyngham. By 1926, the roadway between Nesquehoning and Berwick was paved. US 309/PA 22 was realigned onto the road between Nesquehoning and Hazleton in 1927 while PA 93 was designated to run from US 309/PA 22 (now PA 309) in Hazleton northwest to US 11/PA 19 in Berwick. In 1928, PA 93 was extended northwest from Berwick to PA 339 (now PA 487) in Orangeville along an unpaved road while the concurrent PA 22 designation was removed from US 309. By 1930, a section of the route west of Berwick was under construction.

The southern terminus of PA 93 was cut back to PA 29 (now PA 239) southeast of Nescopeck in the 1930s, with PA 29 replacing the route between there and Hazleton. By this time, the route was paved between Berwick and Orangeville. In the 1940s, PA 93 was extended north from Orangeville to PA 115 (now PA 254) in Rohrsburg, running concurrent with PA 339 before following Rohrsburg Road. In addition, the section of PA 29 between Hazleton and West Hazleton was widened to a multilane highway. US 309 and PA 29 switched alignments between Allentown and Hazleton in the 1950s, with PA 29 designated onto the road between Nesquehoning and Hazleton. On May 9, 1966, PA 93 was extended southeast to US 209 in Nesquehoning, replacing the section of PA 29 between Nesquehoning and southeast of Nescopeck. In the 1960s, the northern terminus of PA 93 was cut back to PA 487 in Orangeville. The road was upgraded to a divided highway between Hazleton and the I-81 interchange in the 1960s.

== Major intersections ==
County	Location	mi	km	Destinations	Notes
Carbon	Nesquehoning	0.000	0.000	US 209 (Catawissa Street) – Jim Thorpe, Nesquehoning, Tamaqua	Southern terminus
Luzerne	Hazle Township	10.991	17.688	PA 424 west (Arthur Gardner Highway) to PA 309 – Hazleton Commerce Center, Tresckow, Tamaqua	Eastern terminus of PA 424
Luzerne	Hazleton	12.962	20.860	PA 309 (Church Street)	
Luzerne	West Hazleton	13.586	21.865	PA 924 south (CAN DO Expressway)	South end of PA 924 concurrency
Luzerne	West Hazleton	14.383	23.147	PA 924 north (Washington Avenue) to Penna Turnpike NE Extension	North end of PA 924 concurrency
Luzerne	Sugarloaf Township	17.004	27.365	I-81 – Harrisburg, Wilkes-Barre	Exit 145 (I-81); northbound entrance to I-81 via Tomhicken Road
Luzerne	Sugarloaf Township	21.513– 21.532	34.622– 34.652	I-80 – Bloomsburg, Stroudsburg	Exit 256 (I-80)
Luzerne	Nescopeck Township	25.356	40.807	PA 239 north	Southern terminus of PA 239
Luzerne	Nescopeck	29.880	48.087	PA 339 south (Broad Street)	Northern terminus of PA 339
Columbia	Berwick	30.699	49.405	US 11 north (Front Street) – Shickshinny	South end of US 11 concurrency
Columbia	Berwick	31.338	50.434	US 11 south (Front Street) – Bloomsburg	North end of US 11 concurrency
Columbia	Orangeville	41.086	66.122	PA 487 (Main Street) – Bloomsburg, Stillwater	Northern terminus
1.000 mi = 1.609 km; 1.000 km = 0.621 mi: Concurrency terminus

== PA 93 Truck ==
Pennsylvania Route 93 Truck
- Location: Carbon County

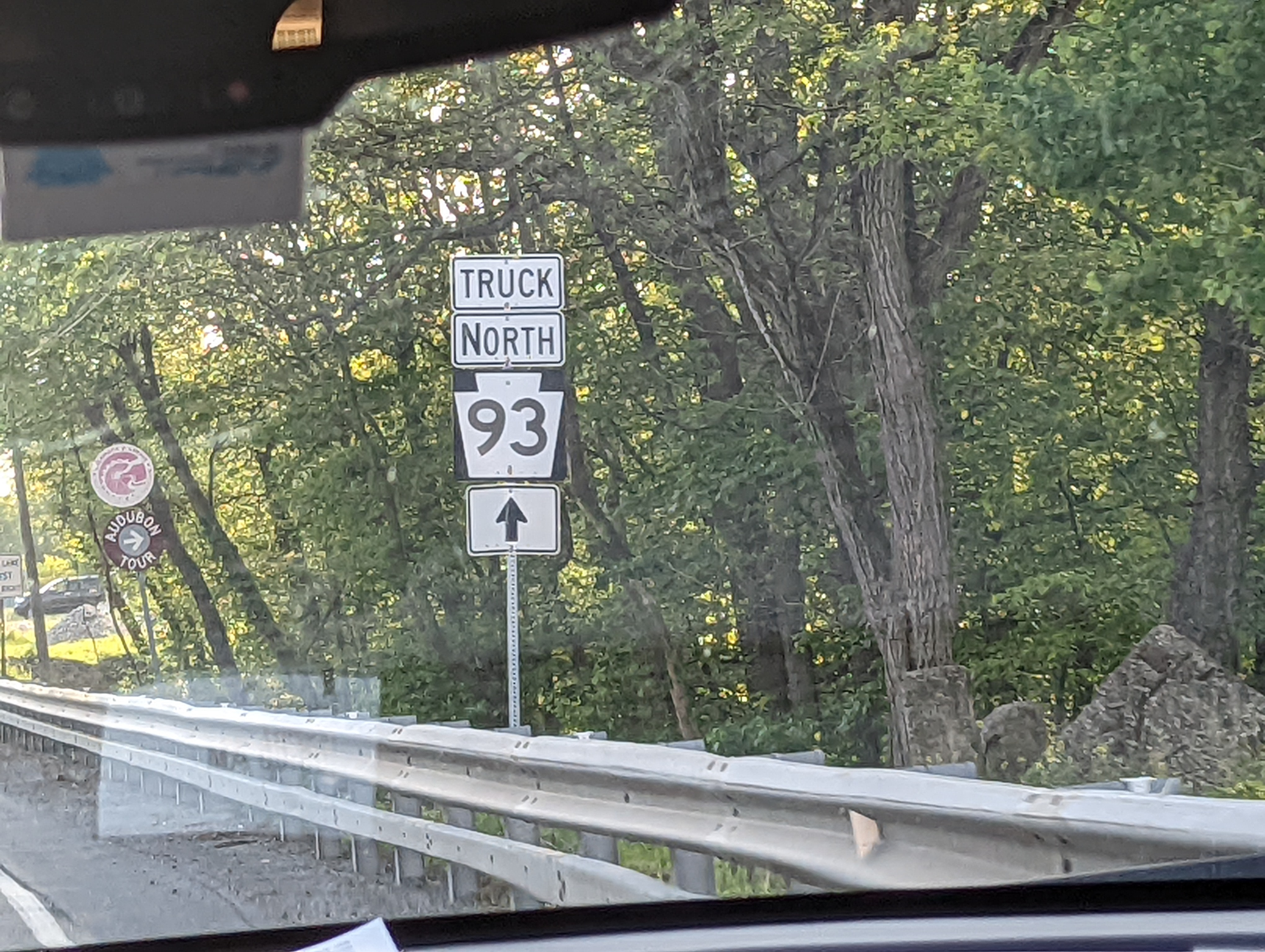
PA 93 Truck from its southern terminus.

Pennsylvania Route 93 Truck (PA 93 Truck) is a truck route of PA 93 that bypasses a weight-restricted bridge over Quakake Creek in Packer Township, on which trucks over 34 tons and combination loads over 40 tons are prohibited. The route follows US 209, PA 54, PA 309, Ben Titus Road, and Quakake Road. The route was originally signed in 2013, but in 2017 the Southbound Truck Route was lengthened to PA 424 restricting most trucks over 28 feet from going down the Broad Mountain after numerous wrecks. The southbound truck route follows PA 424, PA 309, PA 54 and US 209.
