= Zion Grove, Pennsylvania =

Unincorporated community in Pennsylvania, US

- Unincorporated community
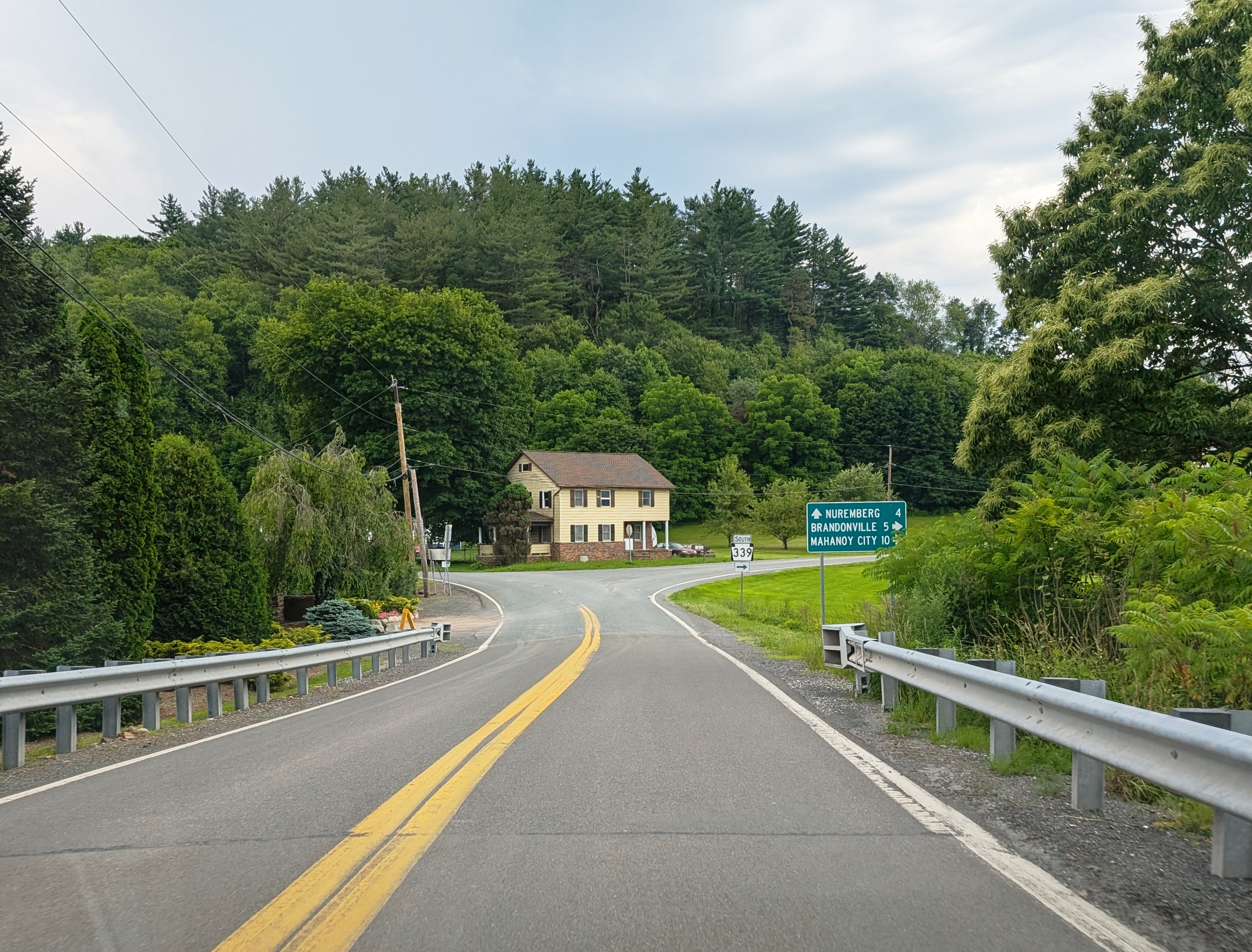
- PA 339 in Zion Grove

- Location within Pennsylvania
- Coordinates: 40°54′09″N 76°12′31″W
- Country: United States
- State: Pennsylvania
- County: Schuylkill
- Elevation: 827 ft (252 m)
- Time zone: UTC-5 (Eastern (EST))
  - Summer (DST): UTC-4 (EDT)
- ZIP code: 17985
- Area codes: 272 & 570
- GNIS feature ID: 1205016

Zion Grove is an unincorporated community in Schuylkill County, Pennsylvania, United States. The community is located along Pennsylvania Route 339, 5.7 miles (9.2 km) north of Shenandoah. Zion Grove has a post office, with ZIP code 17985, which opened on September 21, 1868.
