= Pennsylvania Route 924 =

State highway in Pennsylvania, US

Pennsylvania Route 924

Route information
- Maintained by PennDOT
- Length: 22.234 mi (35.782 km)

Major junctions
- South end: PA 61 in Frackville
- PA 54 in Shenandoah; PA 339 in Brandonville; I-81 in Hazle Township; PA 93 in West Hazleton
- North end: PA 309 in Hazleton

Location
- Country: United States
- State: Pennsylvania
- Counties: Schuylkill, Luzerne

Highway system
- Pennsylvania State Route System; Interstate; US; State; Scenic; Legislative
| ← PA 923 | → PA 925 |

Pennsylvania Route 924 (PA 924) is a 22-mile-long (35 km) state highway in the U.S. state of Pennsylvania. The highway runs from PA 61 in Frackville, Schuylkill County, northeast to PA 309 in Hazleton, Luzerne County. PA 924 runs through rural areas in the Coal Region, serving Gilberton, Shenandoah, Brandonville, and West Hazleton. The route is mostly a two-lane road with the section between Frackville and Shenandoah a four-lane divided highway with an interchange serving Gilberton and another four-lane divided highway section to the west of Hazleton. PA 924 intersects PA 54 in Shenandoah, PA 339 in Brandonville, Interstate 81 (I-81) west of Hazleton, and PA 93 in West Hazleton.

PA 924 was designated in 1928 to run from a point between Brandonville and Sheppton northeast to PA 93 in West Hazleton. PA 142 was designated onto the road between U.S. Route 120 (US 120, now PA 61) in Frackville and Ringtown Boulevard north of Shenandoah, where it continued north to Ringtown. PA 924 was extended southwest to PA 142 north of Shenandoah in the 1930s. In 1946, the route was further extended to US 122 (now PA 61) in Frackville, replacing that section of PA 142. PA 924 was extended east to US 309 (now PA 309) in Hazleton in the 1950s. The route was widened to a divided highway between Gilberton and Shenandoah in the 1950s and between Frackville and Gilberton in 1963, with the road moved to a new alignment in Gilberton with an interchange serving the borough. In 1967, PA 924 was realigned to a new divided highway between Humboldt and PA 93 in West Hazleton.

== Route description ==
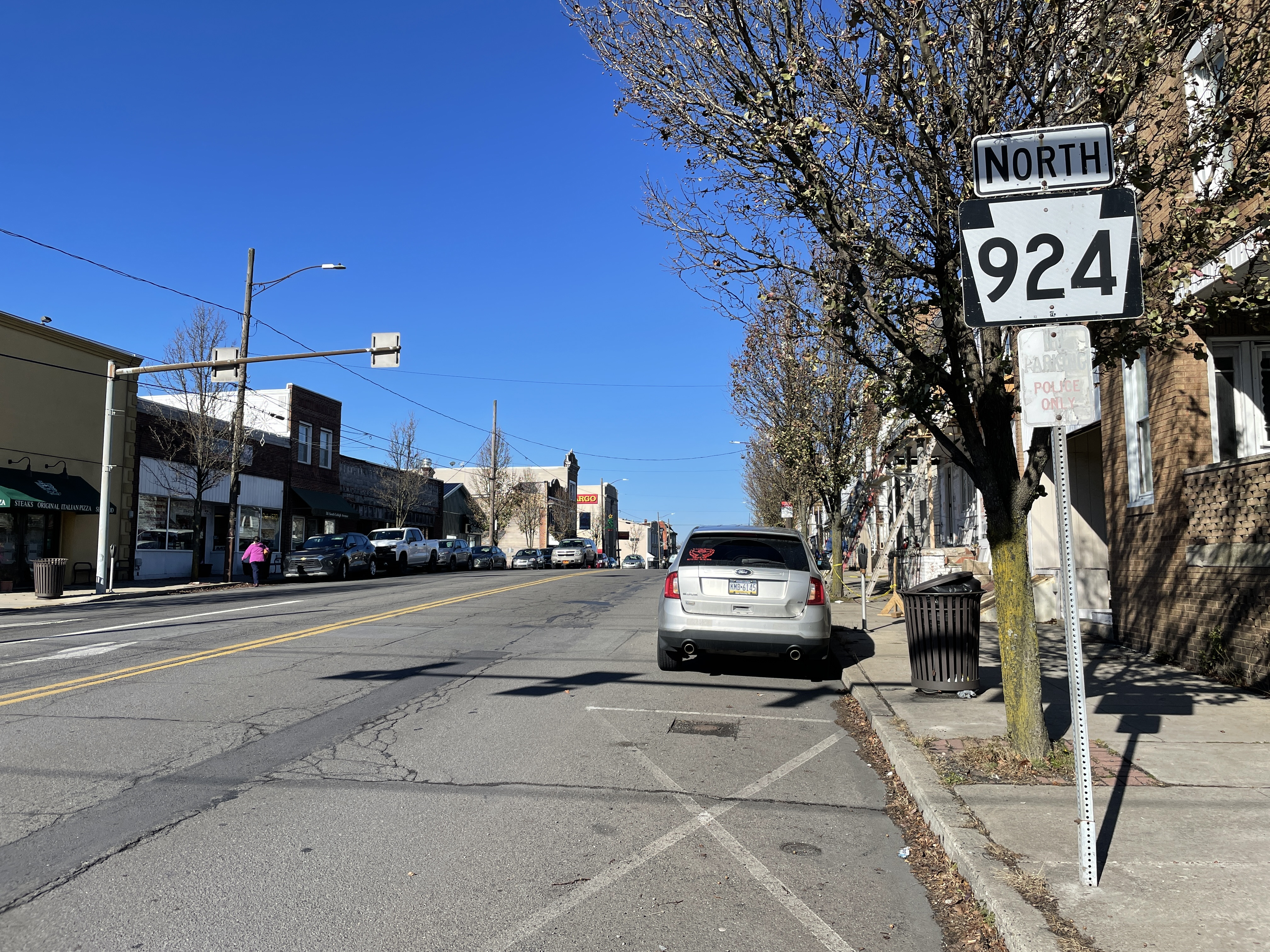
PA 924 northbound past PA 61 in Frackville

PA 924 begins at a junction with PA 61 in the borough of Frackville in Schuylkill County, heading north-northwest on two-lane undivided South Lehigh Avenue, which becomes North Lehigh Avenue upon crossing Frack Street a block later. The road passes businesses and homes in the downtown before bending west. The route heads northeast into forests and briefly runs through West Mahanoy Township before it crosses into the borough of Gilberton, where it becomes a four-lane divided highway called Gold Star Highway. PA 924 traverses the Mahantango Mountains, heading east before resuming back to the northeast. The highway passes to the west of a coal mine and comes to a bridge over the Mahanoy Creek and a Reading Blue Mountain and Northern Railroad line before it has an interchange with Main Street, which serves Gilberton. The route continues northeast near forests and coal mines, passing through a corner of West Mahanoy Township before entering the borough of Shenandoah. Here, PA 924 becomes a four-lane undivided road and passes businesses. The road crosses into Mahanoy Township and curves north in the community of Turkey Run, heading through wooded areas. The route crosses back into the borough of Shenandoah and becomes two-lane undivided South Main Street, running past homes and businesses. PA 924 heads into the downtown area and comes to an intersection with PA 54, where the name becomes North Main Street. The road continues past homes and businesses in the northern part of Shenandoah before it curves northwest.

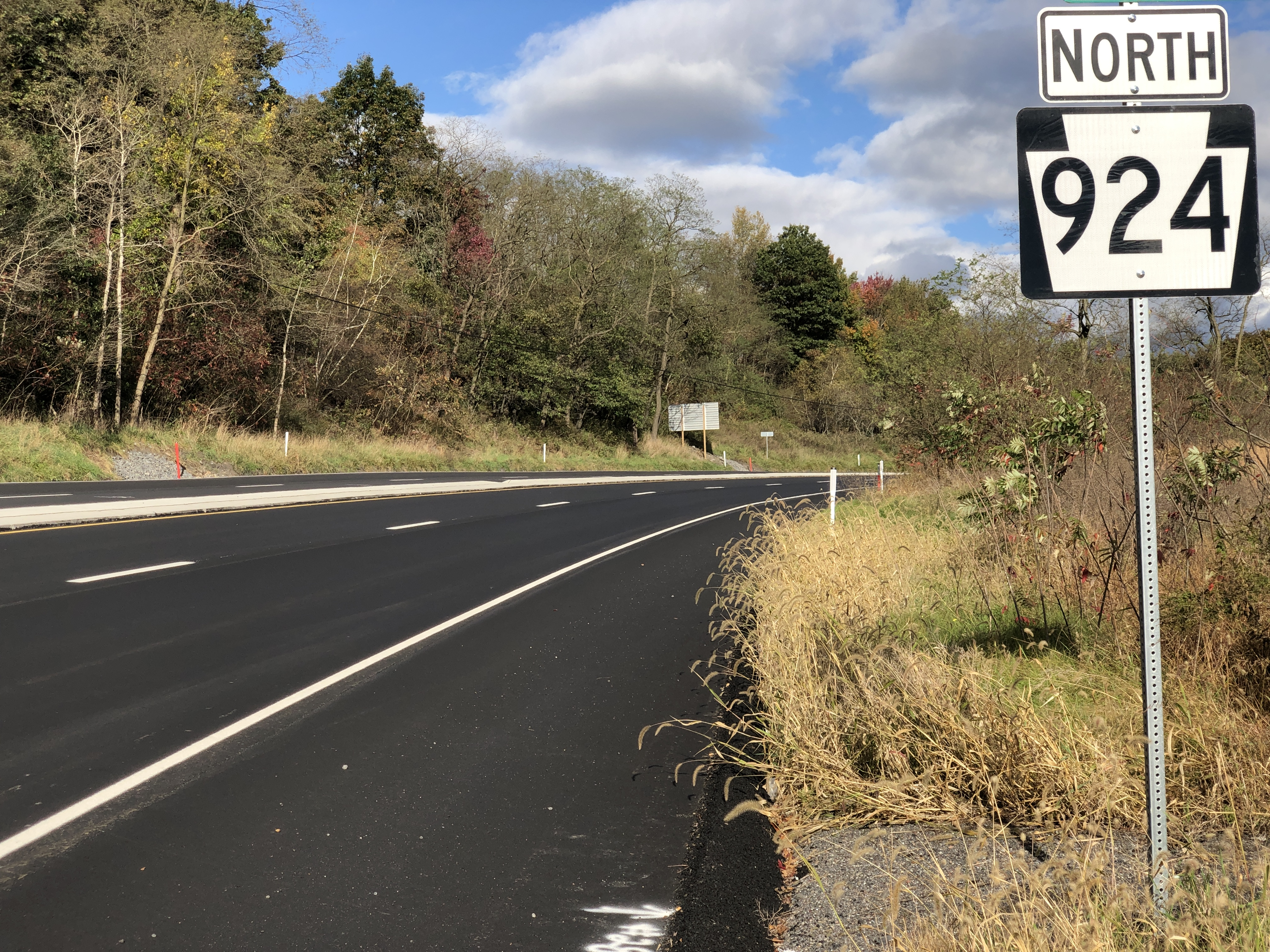
PA 924 northbound in West Mahanoy Township

The route leaves Shenandoah for West Mahanoy Township and becomes Ringtown Boulevard, curving north and east to ascend a forested hill as a three-lane road with two northbound lanes and one southbound lane. PA 924 becomes two lanes again and bends to the north, passing to the east of the community of Shenandoah Heights. The road heads into dense forests and turns northeast off Ringtown Boulevard onto an unnamed road, crossing into Union Township and passing to the east of Fetter Pond. The route continues into East Union Township and comes to an intersection with PA 339. At this point, the two routes head north for a concurrency on Main Boulevard and pass through residential areas in the community of Brandonville. PA 339 splits from PA 924 by turning west, with PA 924 continuing along Main Boulevard, curving northeast and running through farmland with some woods and homes. The road crosses the Catawissa Creek and winds northeast through forested areas with some fields, heading east. The route turns north and passes residences in the community of Sheppton as Center Street. PA 924 becomes unnamed and runs through forests with some homes and passes to the east of the community of Oneida, where it curves to the east-northeast through more woodland.

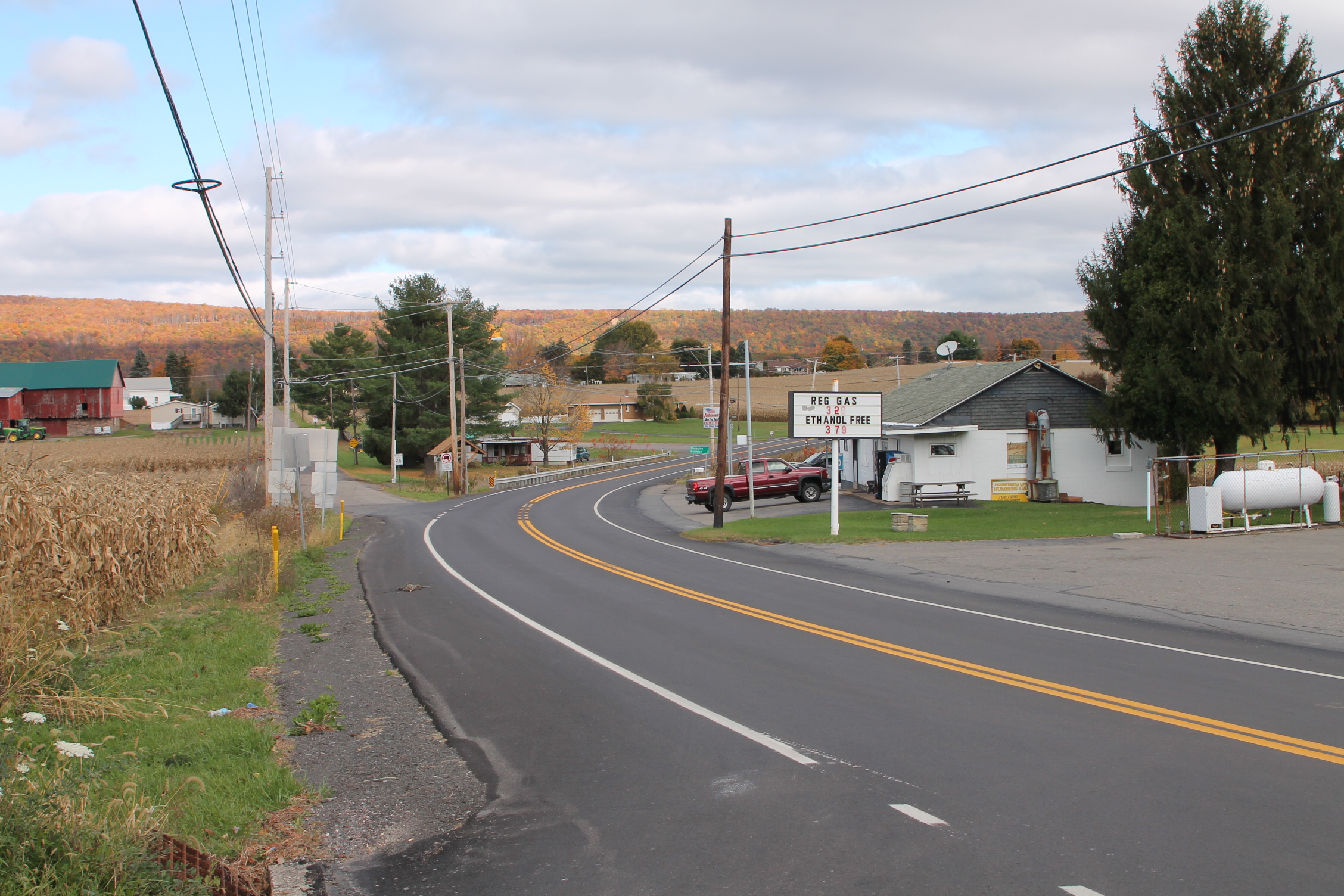
PA 924 north of Brandonville

PA 924 crosses into Hazle Township in Luzerne County and continues east-northeast through forested areas with some commercial development. The road heads into the Humboldt Industrial Park and widens to four lanes, briefly becoming a divided highway as it crosses a CAN DO Inc. railroad branch line that serves the industrial park. The route becomes a five-lane road with a center left-turn lane and runs past more industry as it heads to the south of the Village of Humboldt. PA 924 passes businesses and becomes a four-lane divided highway, coming to a partial cloverleaf interchange with I-81. Past this interchange, the route passes to the north of the community of Harwood Mines and continues through wooded areas as the four-lane divided CAN DO Expressway. The road passes over Cranberry Creek and Norfolk Southern's Tomhicken Industrial Track railroad line before it bends east and becomes the border between the borough of West Hazleton to the north and the city of Hazleton to the south. PA 924 runs through woods between residential areas to the north and a coal mine to the south before it comes to an intersection with PA 93. Here, the route turns northwest to form a concurrency with PA 93 on four-lane undivided Broad Street, running past homes in West Hazleton. The road turns to the north before PA 924 splits from PA 93 by heading east on two-lane Washington Avenue. The route passes residences and a few businesses, crossing into the city of Hazleton and becoming West 15th Street. PA 924 continues through developed areas of the city and reaches its northern terminus at an intersection with PA 309.

== History ==
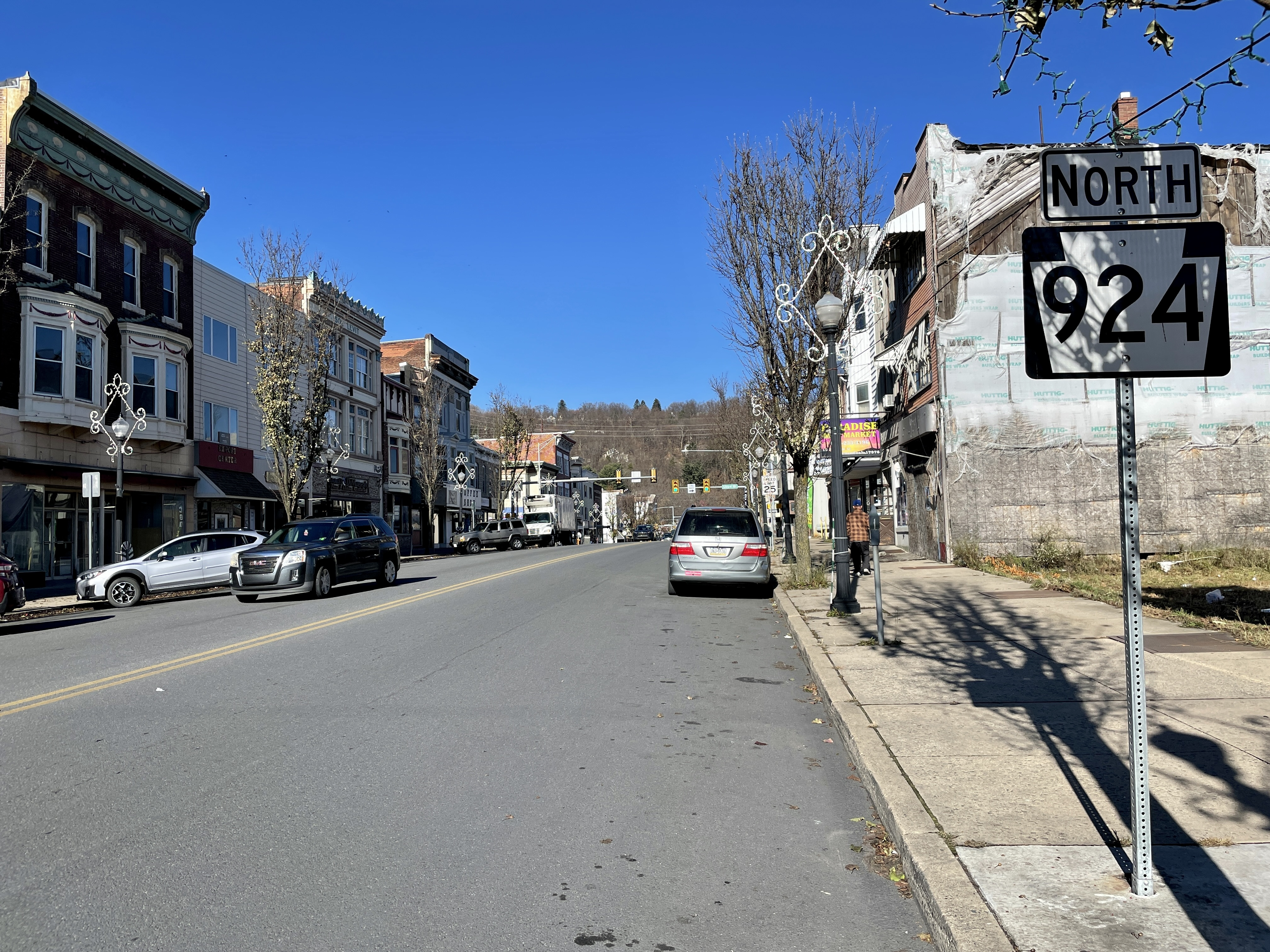
PA 924 northbound past PA 54 in Shenandoah

When Pennsylvania legislated routes in 1911, the road between Frackville and Shenandoah was designated as part of Legislative Route 183. PA 924 was designated in 1928 to run from a point between Brandonville and Sheppton northeast to PA 93 in West Hazleton; at this time the entire route was unpaved except for the portion near West Hazleton. The section of the present route between US 120 (now PA 61) in Frackville and Ringtown Boulevard north of Shenandoah was designated as part of PA 142 in 1928; PA 142 continued north from Shenandoah to Ringtown. At this time, the section of PA 142 between Frackville and Sheandoah was paved. By 1930, PA 924 was paved between southwest of Sheppton and the border of Schuylkill and Luzerne counties while the remainder of the route was under construction. At this time, the road between north of Shenandoah and between Brandonville and Sheppton was an unnumbered, unpaved road. In the 1930s, PA 924 was extended southwest to PA 142 (Ringtown Boulevard) north of Shenandoah; at this time the entire route was paved. PA 142 was also widened to a multilane road between Frackville and Gilberton.

PA 924 was extended south to US 122 (now PA 61) in Frackville in 1946, replacing that section of PA 142 while the remainder of PA 142 was decommissioned. In the 1950s, PA 924 was extended from PA 29 (now PA 93) in West Hazleton east to US 309 (now PA 309) in Hazleton along 15th Street. In addition, the route was widened to a divided highway between Gilberton and Shenandoah. PA 924 was widened into a divided highway between Frackville and Gilberton in 1963. In Gilberton, the route was shifted east to a new alignment, with an interchange constructed at Main Street. PA 924 previously ran through Gilberton using what is now Old Maizeville Road and Our Lady of Siluva Boulevard; the portions of the former alignment leading the current route have been severed. In 1967, the route was realigned to a new divided highway between Humboldt and PA 93 on the border of Hazleton and West Hazleton, where it turned northwest for a concurrency with PA 93. The route previously followed Main Street through Harwood Mines, Harwood Road, Cranberry Road, and South Broad Street between Humboldt and PA 93 in West Hazleton. A section of the former alignment west of Harwood Mines was severed with the construction of I-81.

== Major intersections ==
| County | Location | mi | km | Destinations | Notes |
|---|---|---|---|---|---|
| Schuylkill | Frackville | 0.000 | 0.000 | PA 61 (South Lehigh Avenue / West Oak Street) | Southern terminus |
| Schuylkill | Gilberton | 1.398 | 2.250 | Gilberton | Interchange; access via Main Street |
| Schuylkill | Shenandoah | 3.641 | 5.860 | PA 54 (Centre Street) | |
| Schuylkill | East Union Township | 7.097 | 11.422 | PA 339 south – Mahanoy City | South end of PA 339 overlap |
| Schuylkill | East Union Township | 7.723 | 12.429 | PA 339 north (Rattlin Run Road) – Ringtown | North end of PA 339 overlap |
| Luzerne | Hazle Township | 18.115 | 29.153 | I-81 – Wilkes-Barre, Harrisburg | Exit 143 on I-81 |
| Luzerne | Hazleton | 20.332 | 32.721 | PA 93 south (West Broad Street) – Hazleton City | South end of PA 93 overlap |
| Luzerne | West Hazleton | 21.129 | 34.004 | PA 93 north (North Broad Street) | North end of PA 93 overlap |
| Luzerne | Hazleton | 22.234 | 35.782 | PA 309 (North Church Street) to PA 940 | Northern terminus |
1.000 mi = 1.609 km; 1.000 km = 0.621 mi: Concurrency terminus
