= Nescopeck, Pennsylvania =

Borough in Pennsylvania, US

- Borough
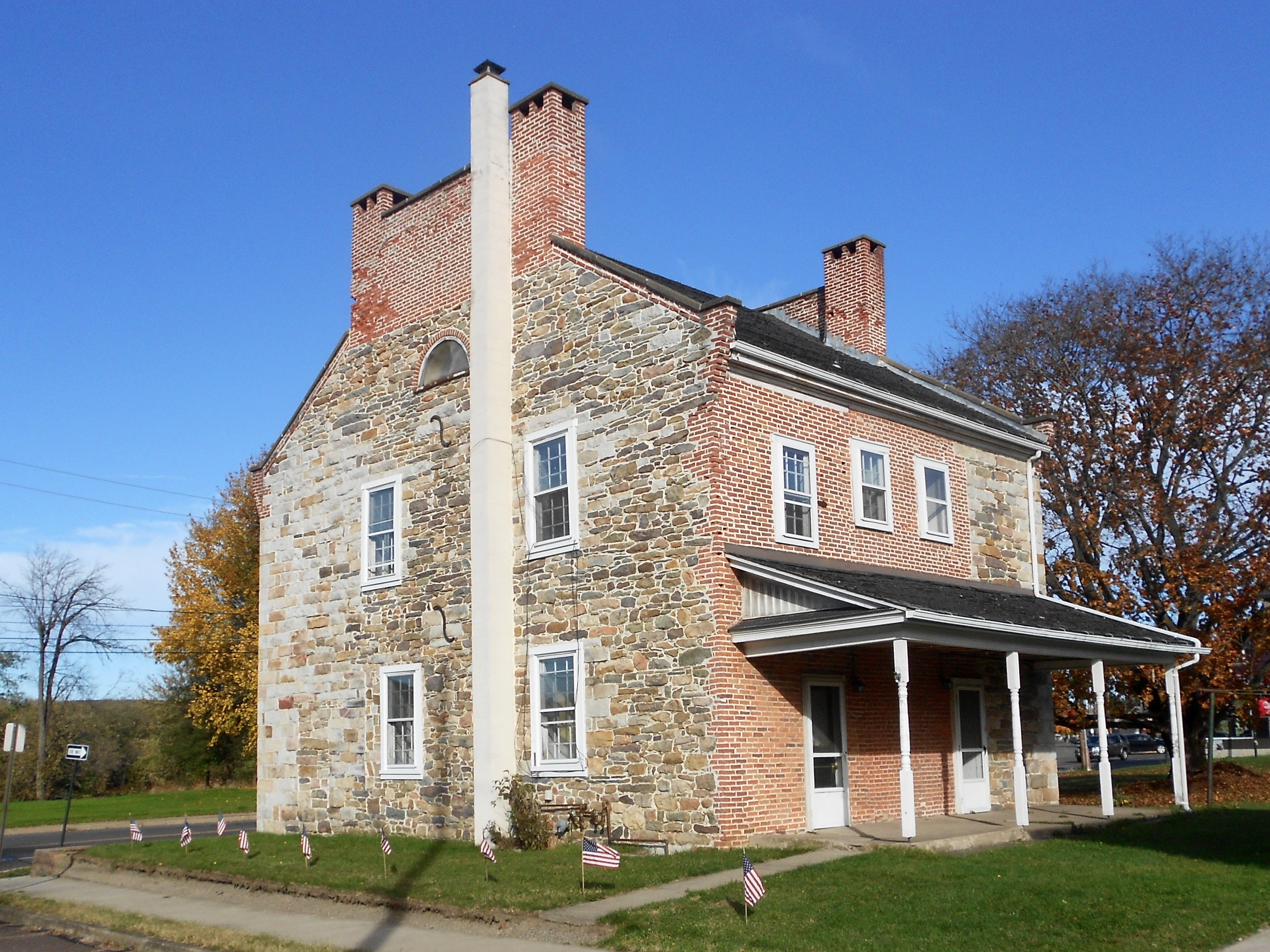
- The Cooper House in Nescopeck (along PA 93)

- Location of Nescopeck in Luzerne County, Pennsylvania.

- Location within Pennsylvania Location within the United States
- Coordinates: 41°03′09″N 76°12′57″W
- Country: United States
- State: Pennsylvania
- County: Luzerne
- Settled: 1786
- Incorporated: 1896

Government
  - Type: Borough Council

Area
  - Total: 1.17 sq mi (3.03 km^{2})
  - Land: 0.99 sq mi (2.56 km^{2})
  - Water: 0.18 sq mi (0.47 km^{2})

Population (2020)
  - Total: 1,480
  - Density: 1,498/sq mi (578.3/km^{2})
- Time zone: UTC-5 (Eastern (EST))
  - Summer (DST): UTC-4 (EDT)
- Zip code: 18635
- Area code: 570
- FIPS code: 42-52984

Nescopeck is a borough in Luzerne County, Pennsylvania, United States. The population was 1,480 as of the 2020 census.

== History ==
Nescopeck was first settled in 1786; it was later incorporated as a borough in 1896. By 1900, over one thousand people resided in the borough. That number would peak at 1,934 in 1960.

The borough derives its name from Nescopeck Creek, a Native American name purported to mean "black, deep, and still water".

In 2011 between September 6 and September 9, Nescopeck became one of many victims to Tropical Storm Lee. Lower-lying parts of the town that neighbored the Susquehanna River became flooded. One of the buildings that suffered damage was the Cooper House. After sitting for almost eight years, the historical building of 1817 was finally demolished on April 26, 2019.

On August 5, 2022, a fire at a house killed ten people at a home in Nescopeck, including three children. All of the victims were related to a volunteer firefighter who responded to the blaze. Eight days later on August 13, a man drove into a crowd at a fundraiser for the victims in nearby Berwick, killing one person and wounding 19 others. The man, Adrian Sura-Reyes, then drove to a home in Nescopeck, where he beat his mother to death. He was sentenced to life in prison in June 2023 for criminal homicide and attempted criminal homicide.

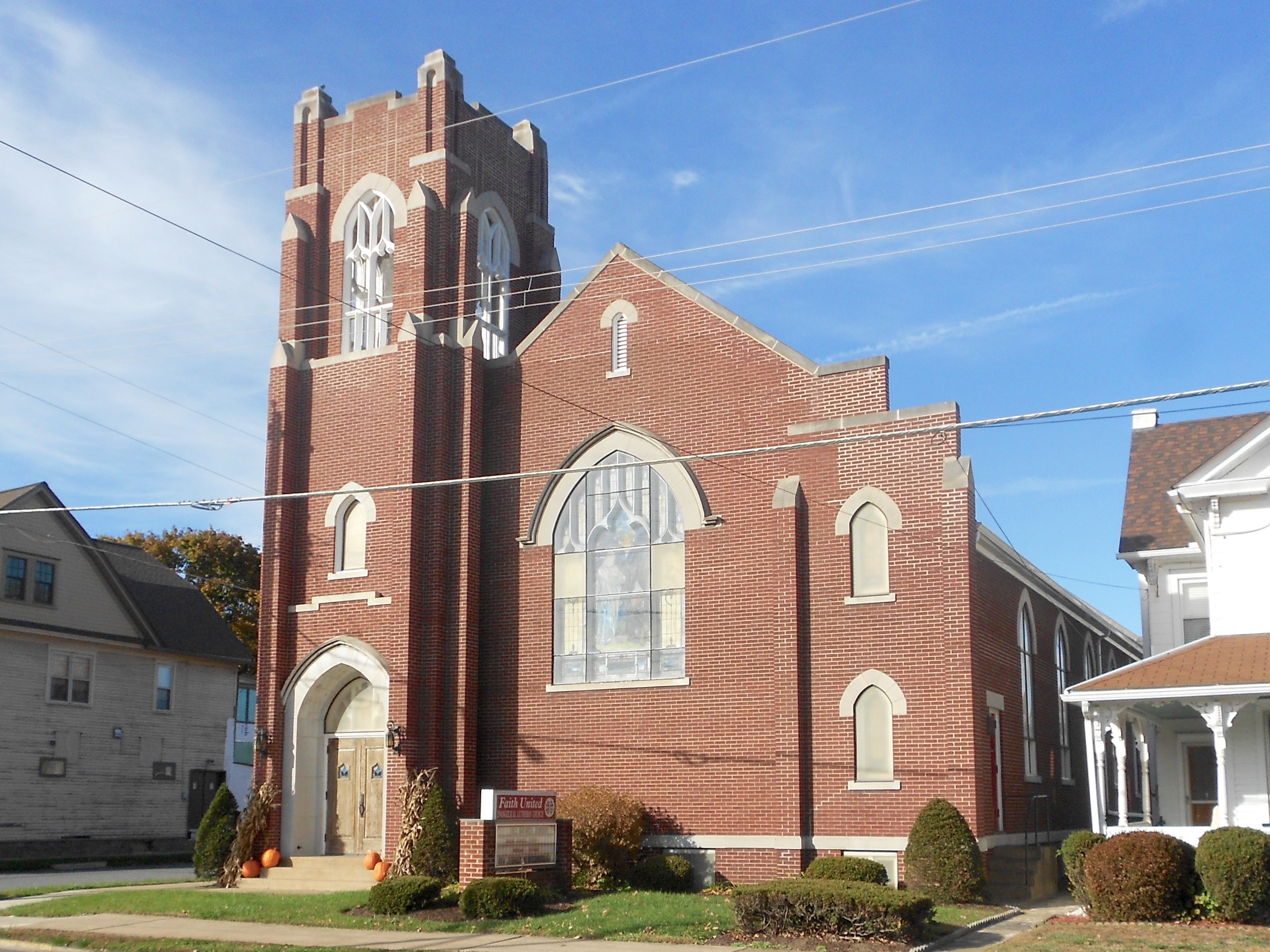
Faith United Lutheran Church

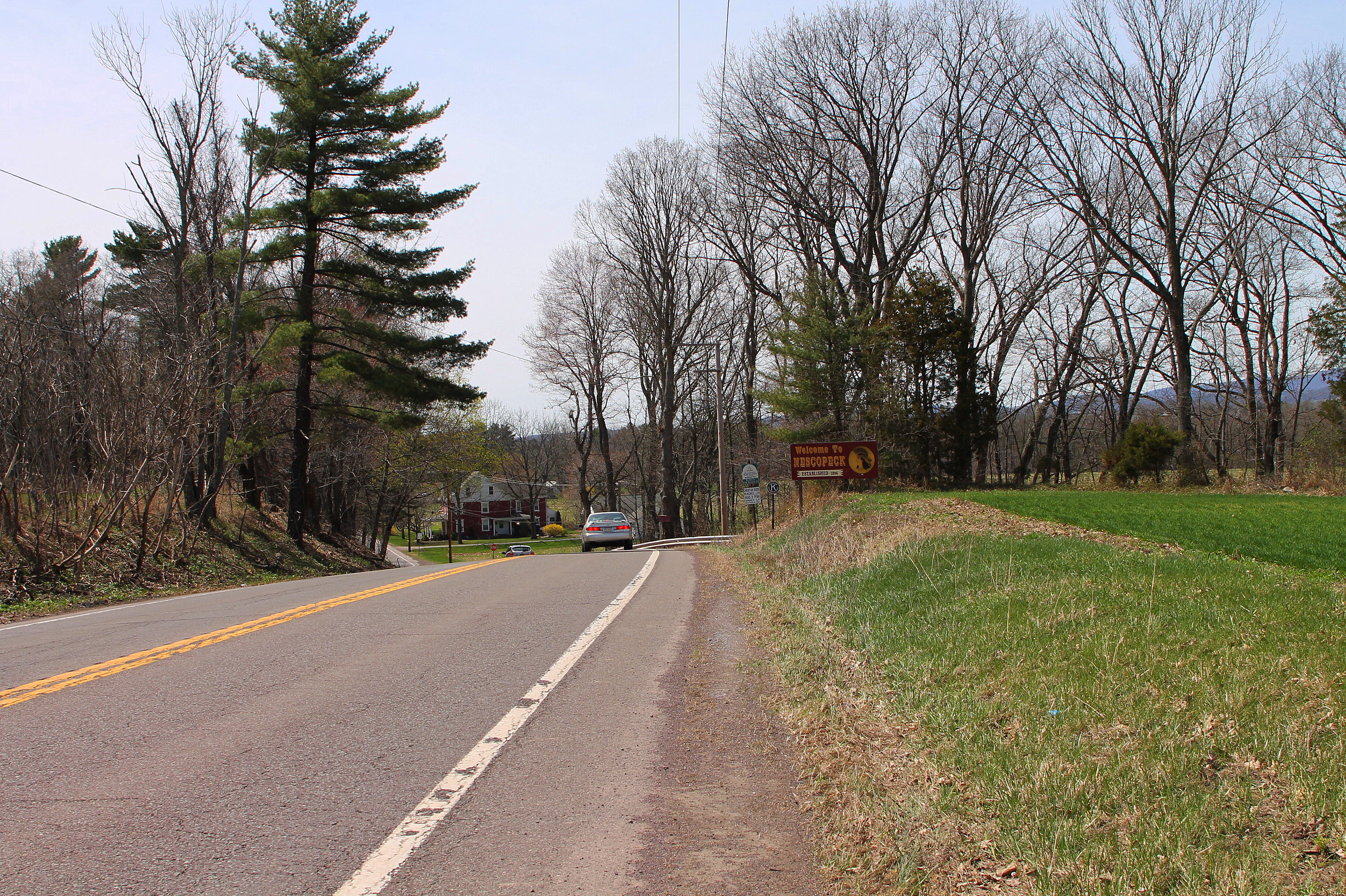
Entering Nescopeck on PA 93

== Geography ==
Nescopeck is located at 41°3′9″N 76°12′57″W (41.052379, -76.215871).

According to the United States Census Bureau, the borough has a total area of 1.0 square mile (2.7 km^{2}), all land. Nescopeck is located along the Susquehanna River (just outside of Berwick). It is a small farming community. PA 93 runs east to west through the borough. The highway crosses over the Susquehanna and links neighboring Berwick to Nescopeck. PA 339 enters Nescopeck from the west; it connects with PA 93 in the middle of the town.

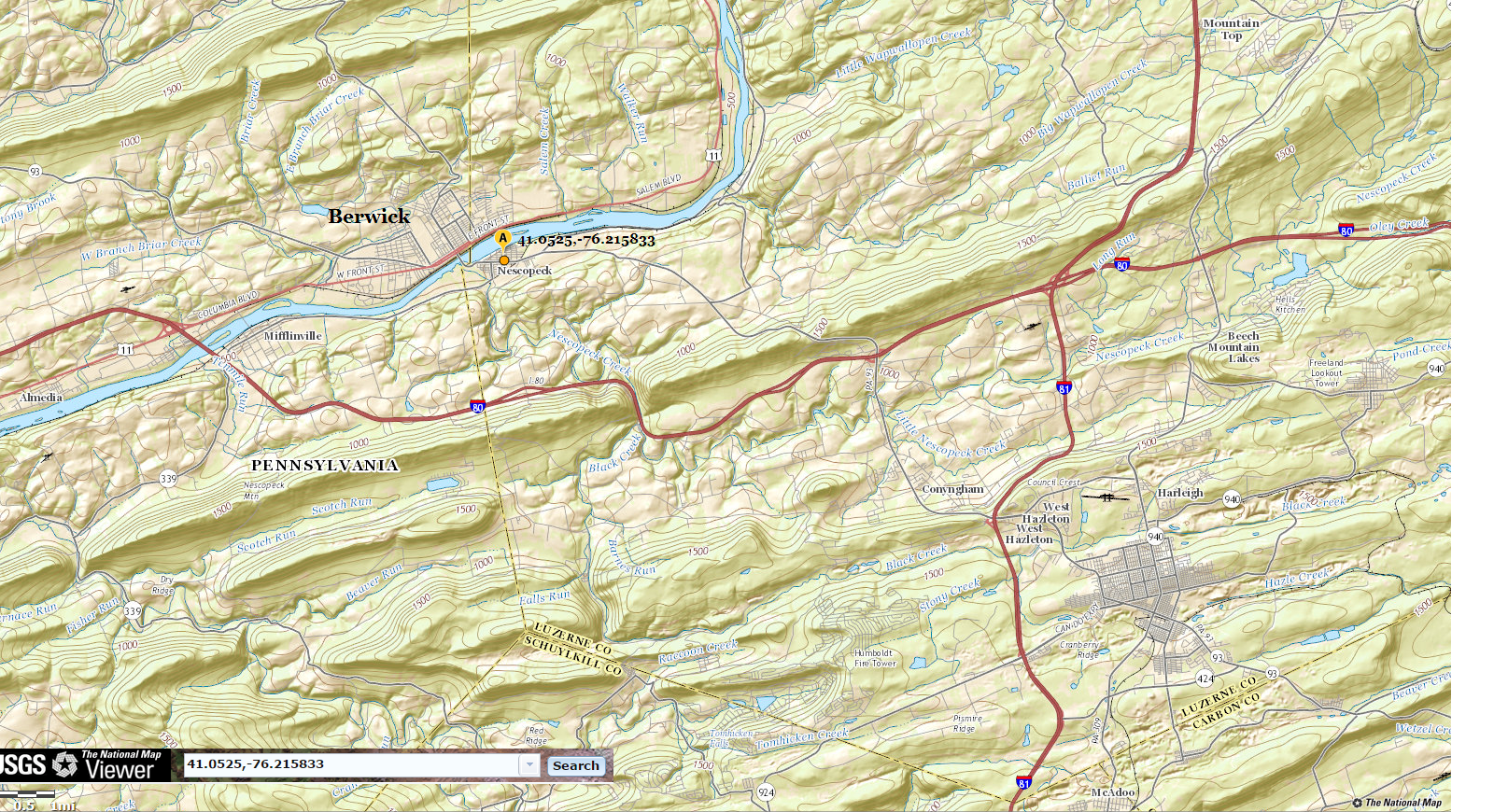
A topographic map of the area in and around Nescopeck.

=== Climate ===
The Köppen Climate Classification subtype for this climate is "Dfb" (Warm Summer Continental Climate). It has four distinct seasons. Winters are cold. The surrounding mountains have an influence on the climate (including both precipitation and temperatures), leading to wide variations within a short distance. On average, temperatures below 0 °F (−17.8 °C) are infrequent, occurring several days per year, and there are several dozen days where the maximum temperature remains below 32 °F (0.0 °C). Severe snowstorms are rare. However, when snowstorms do occur, they can disrupt normal routines for several days.

Summers are warm. In an average summer, temperatures exceeding 90 °F (32.2 °C) occur several days and can occasionally exceed 100 °F (37.8 °C). Spring and fall are unpredictable with temperatures ranging from cold to warm (although they are usually mild). On average, Nescopeck receives precipitation which is relatively evenly distributed throughout the year (though the summer months receive more precipitation).

Climate data for Nescopeck, Pennsylvania
Month	Jan	Feb	Mar	Apr	May	Jun	Jul	Aug	Sep	Oct	Nov	Dec	Year
Mean daily maximum °C (°F)	2 (36)	4 (39)	9 (48)	17 (62)	23 (73)	28 (82)	30 (86)	29 (84)	24 (76)	19 (66)	11 (51)	4 (39)	17 (62)
Mean daily minimum °C (°F)	−7 (19)	−7 (20)	−2 (28)	3 (37)	9 (48)	14 (57)	16 (61)	16 (60)	12 (53)	5 (41)	1 (33)	−5 (23)	4 (40)
Average precipitation mm (inches)	58 (2.3)	58 (2.3)	69 (2.7)	86 (3.4)	100 (4)	91 (3.6)	100 (4.1)	100 (4)	91 (3.6)	71 (2.8)	81 (3.2)	74 (2.9)	990 (39)
Source: Weatherbase

== Demographics ==
Historical population
Census	Pop.	Note	%±
1880	360		—
1890	698		93.9%
1900	1,100		57.6%
1910	1,578		43.5%
1920	1,638		3.8%
1930	1,614		−1.5%
1940	1,805		11.8%
1950	1,907		5.7%
1960	1,934		1.4%
1970	1,897		−1.9%
1980	1,768		−6.8%
1990	1,651		−6.6%
2000	1,528		−7.5%
2010	1,583		3.6%
2020	1,480		−6.5%
2021 (est.)	1,476	▼	−0.3%

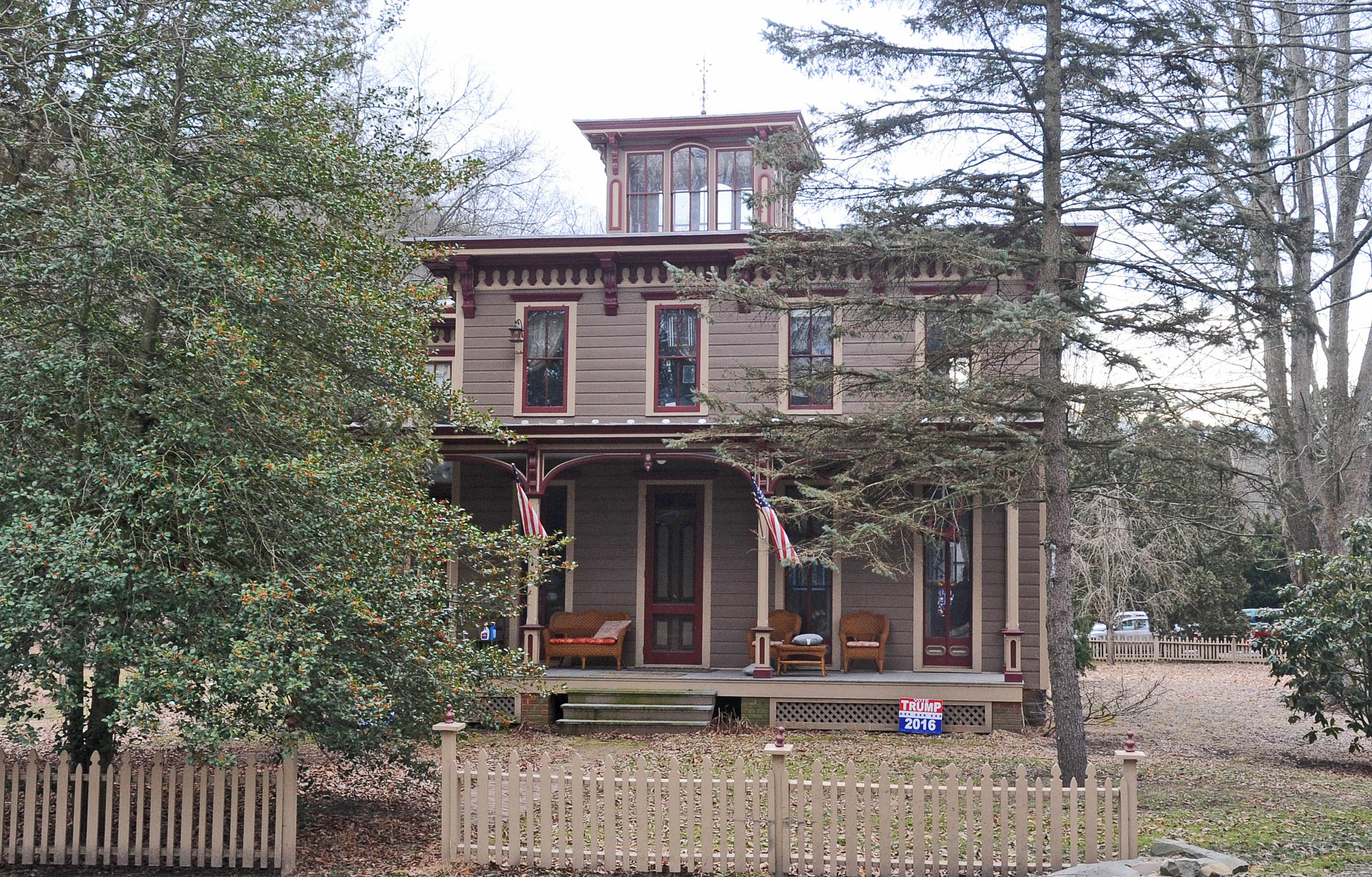
House in Nescopeck

As of the census of 2000, there were 1,528 people, 672 households, and 417 families residing in the borough. The population density was 1,534.8 inhabitants per square mile (592.6/km^{2}). There were 729 housing units at an average density of 732.3 per square mile (282.7/km^{2}). The racial makeup of the borough was 98.23% White, 0.52% African American, 0.33% Native American, 0.20% Asian, 0.33% from other races, and 0.39% from two or more races. Hispanic or Latino of any race were 1.24% of the population.

There were 672 households, out of which 27.2% had children under the age of 18 living with them, 49.4% were married couples living together, 7.6% had a female householder with no husband present, and 37.9% were non-families. 32.9% of all households were made up of individuals, and 14.7% had someone living alone who was 65 years of age or older. The average household size was 2.27 and the average family size was 2.92.

In the borough the population was spread out, with 22.1% under the age of 18, 7.8% from 18 to 24, 29.6% from 25 to 44, 21.9% from 45 to 64, and 18.6% who were 65 years of age or older. The median age was 38 years. For every 100 females there were 92.0 males. For every 100 females age 18 and over, there were 88.9 males.

The median income for a household in the borough was $31,379, and the median income for a family was $39,440. Males had a median income of $30,625 versus $20,586 for females. The per capita income for the borough was $16,553. About 5.3% of families and 7.5% of the population were below the poverty line, including 6.3% of those under age 18 and 9.9% of those age 65 or over.

== Education ==
The school district is the Berwick Area School District.
