= Brandonville, Pennsylvania =

Unincorporated community in Pennsylvania, US

Brandonville
- Census-designated place
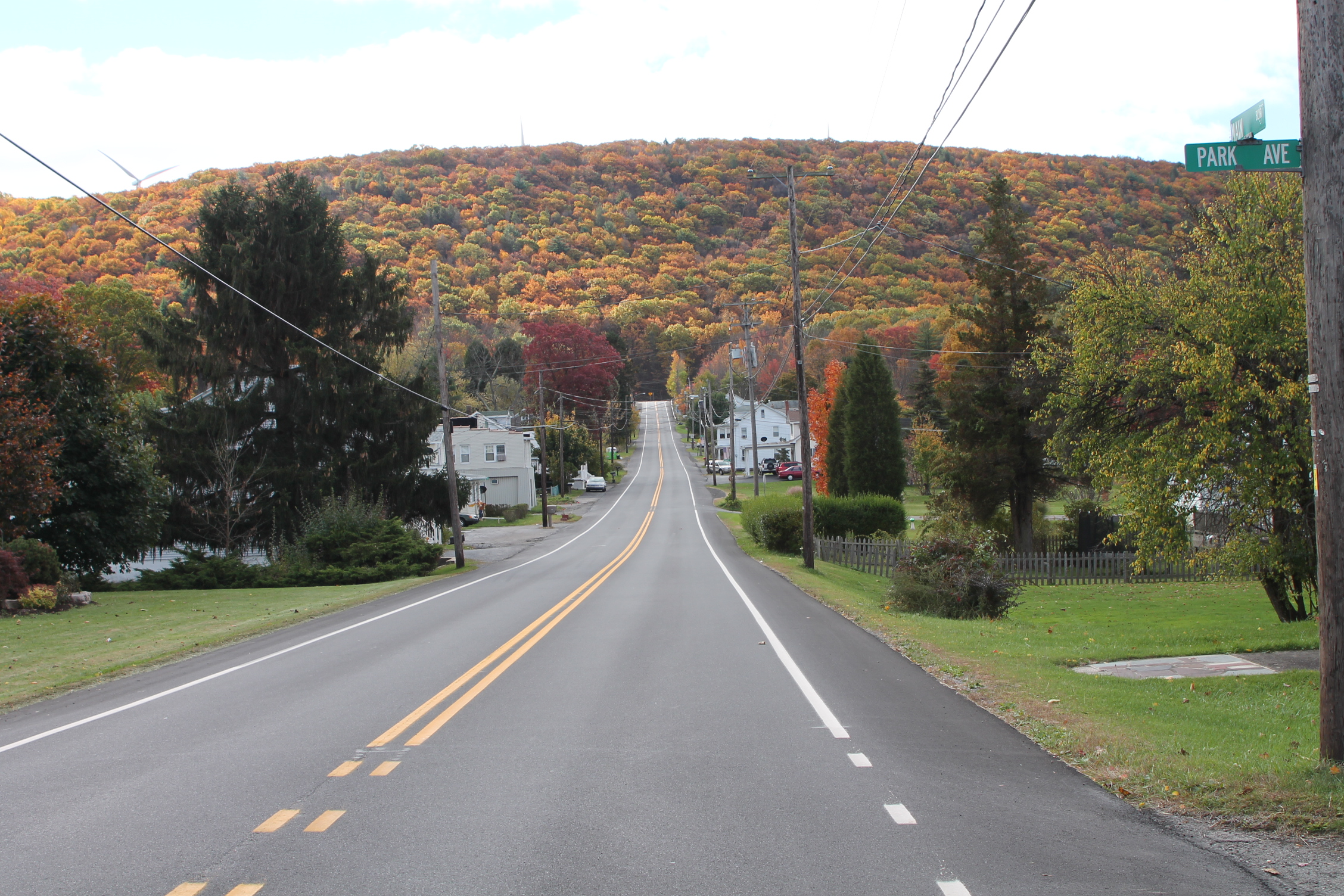
- Brandonville in October 2014

- Location of Brandonville in Pennsylvania Brandonville (the United States)
- Coordinates: 40°51′39″N 76°10′0″W
- Country: United States
- State: Pennsylvania
- County: Schuylkill
- Township: East Union

Area
  - Total: 1.40 sq mi (3.63 km^{2})
  - Land: 1.40 sq mi (3.63 km^{2})
  - Water: 0 sq mi (0.00 km^{2})

Population (2020)
  - Total: 180
  - Density: 128.4/sq mi (49.58/km^{2})
- Time zone: UTC-5 (Eastern (EST))
  - Summer (DST): UTC-4 (EDT)
- ZIP Code: 17967
- Area code: 570
- FIPS code: 42-08240

Brandonville is a census-designated place (CDP) in East Union Township in Schuylkill County, Pennsylvania. The population was 180 at the 2020 census.

== Geography ==
Brandonville is located at 40°51′39″N 76°10′0″W (40.860825, -76.166718). According to the U.S. Census Bureau, Bradonville has a total area of 1.4 square miles (3.6 km^{2}), all land.

== Demographics ==
Historical population
Census	Pop.	Note	%±
2020	180		—
U.S. Decennial Census

At the 2000 census there were 180 residents in Brandonville. As of 2020, the population density was 153.4 inhabitants per square mile (59.2/km^{2}). There were 99 housing units at an average density of 70.0 per square mile (27.0/km^{2}). The racial makeup of the CDP was 100.00% White. Of the 90 households 23.3% had children under the age of 18 living with them, 43.3% were married couples living together, 11.1% had a female householder with no husband present, and 34.4% were non-families. 31.1% of households were one person and 14.4% were one person aged 65 or older. The average household size was 2.41 and the average family size was 2.98.

The age distribution was 19.4% under the age of 18, 6.5% from 18 to 24, 24.4% from 25 to 44, 27.6% from 45 to 64, and 22.1% 65 or older. The median age was 44 years. For every 100 females, there were 114.9 males. For every 100 females age 18 and over, there were 105.9 males.

The median household income was $26,125 and the median family income was $36,875. Males had a median income of $25,833 versus $20,417 for females. The per capita income for the CDP was $14,973. About 3.8% of families and 7.7% of the population were below the poverty line, including 4.8% of those under the age of eighteen and none of those sixty five or over.

== Education ==
The Hazleton Area School District covers the CDP. The zoned public high school is Hazleton Area High School in Hazle Township.
