= Long Trip =

Long Trip or The Long Trip may refer to:

- The Long Trip, a 1990 Finnish documentary film
- "Long Trip", a 1962 song by American singer-songwriter Scott Walker
- "Long Trip", a 2020 song by Thai singer Thanasit Jaturaput
- "The Long Trip", a 1950s comic story published in the American comic book series Weird Fantasy

== See also ==
- A Long Journey (disambiguation)
- Long March (disambiguation)
- Long Road (disambiguation)
- Long Run (disambiguation)
- The Long Run (disambiguation)
- Long Trail (disambiguation)
- Long Walk (disambiguation)
- The Longest Journey (disambiguation)
- The Longest Ride (disambiguation)
