= Long Run =

Long Run, Long-run, or Longrun may refer to:

- Long-run, a concept in economics

== Places in the United States ==
- Long Run, Louisville, Kentucky
  - Long Run massacre, 1781, in what is now eastern Jefferson County, Kentucky
- Longrun, Missouri
- Long Run, Ohio, a ghost town
- Long Run, West Virginia
- Long Run (Cranberry Creek tributary), in Luzerne County, in Pennsylvania
- Long Run (Elk Run tributary), in Sullivan County, Pennsylvania
- Long Run (Nescopeck Creek tributary), in Luzerne County, Pennsylvania

== Other uses ==
- Long Run (horse) (foaled 2005), a National Hunt racehorse
- LongRun, a power management technology

== See also ==
- Short-run
- The Long Run (disambiguation)
- Long March (disambiguation)
- Long Play (disambiguation)
- Long Walk (disambiguation)
