= Raccoon Creek (Tomhicken Creek tributary) =

Coordinates: 40.9255°N 76.1745°W

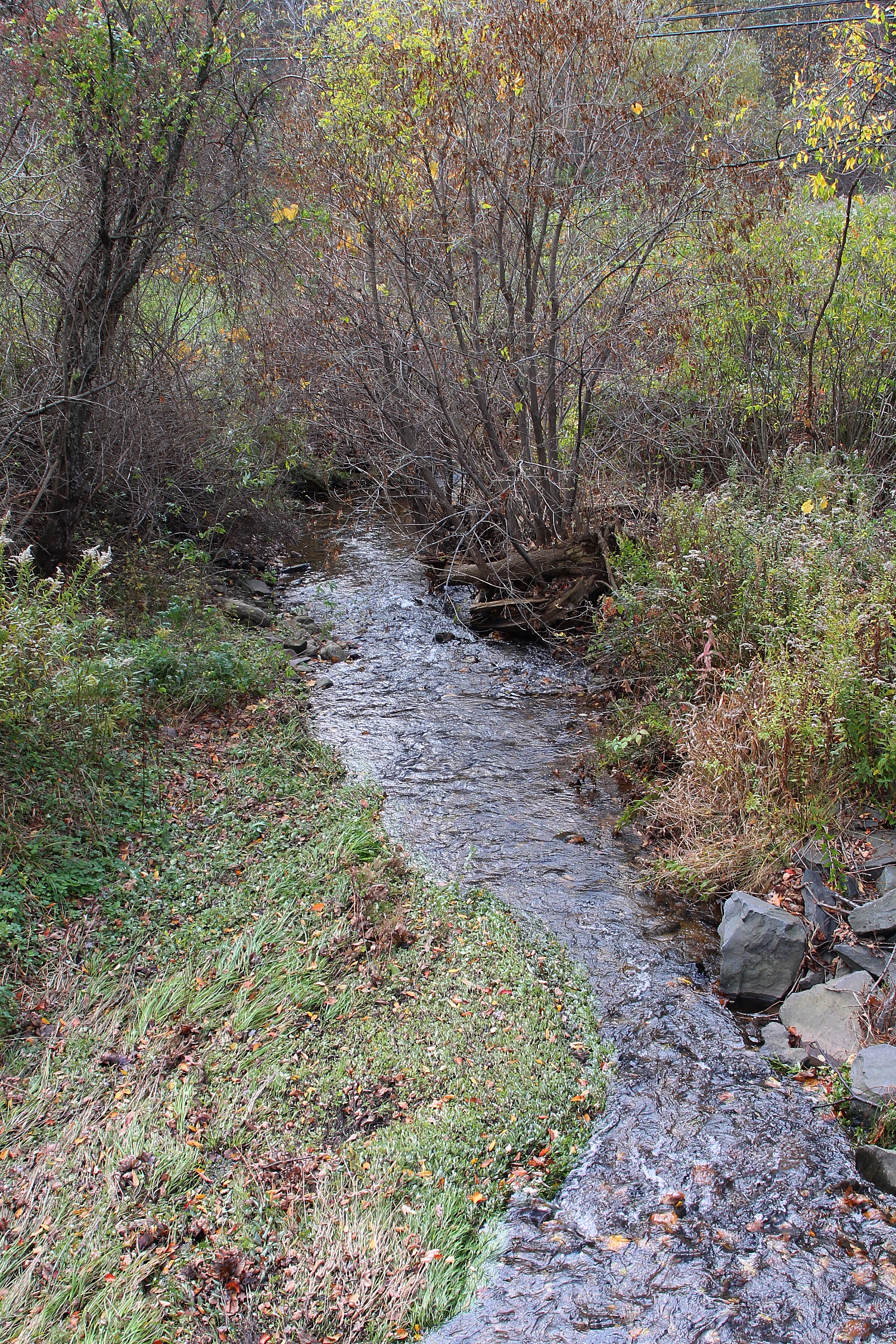
- Raccoon Creek looking downstream in Nuremberg, Pennsylvania

Physical characteristics
- Source
  - location: valley between Little Sugarloaf Mountain and South Buck Mountain in Black Creek Township, Luzerne County, Pennsylvania
  - elevation: 1,240 ft (380 m)
- Mouth
  - location: Tomhicken Creek in North Union Township, Schuylkill County, Pennsylvania
  - elevation: 902 ft (275 m)
- Length: 3.3 mi (5.3 km)
- Basin size: 2.67 sq mi (6.9 km^{2})

Basin features
- Progression: Tomhicken Creek → Catawissa Creek → Susquehanna River → Chesapeake Bay

Raccoon Creek is a tributary of Tomhicken Creek in Luzerne County and Schuylkill County, in Pennsylvania, in the United States. It is approximately 3.3 miles (5.3 km) long and flows through Black Creek Township in Luzerne County and North Union Township in Schuylkill County. The watershed of the stream has an area of 2.67 square miles (6.9 km^{2}). The stream is considered to be a High-Quality Coldwater Fishery and Class A Wild Trout Waters. The main rock formations in the stream's watershed are the Mauch Chunk Formation and the Pottsville Formation and the main soil is the Leck Kill soil.

== Course ==
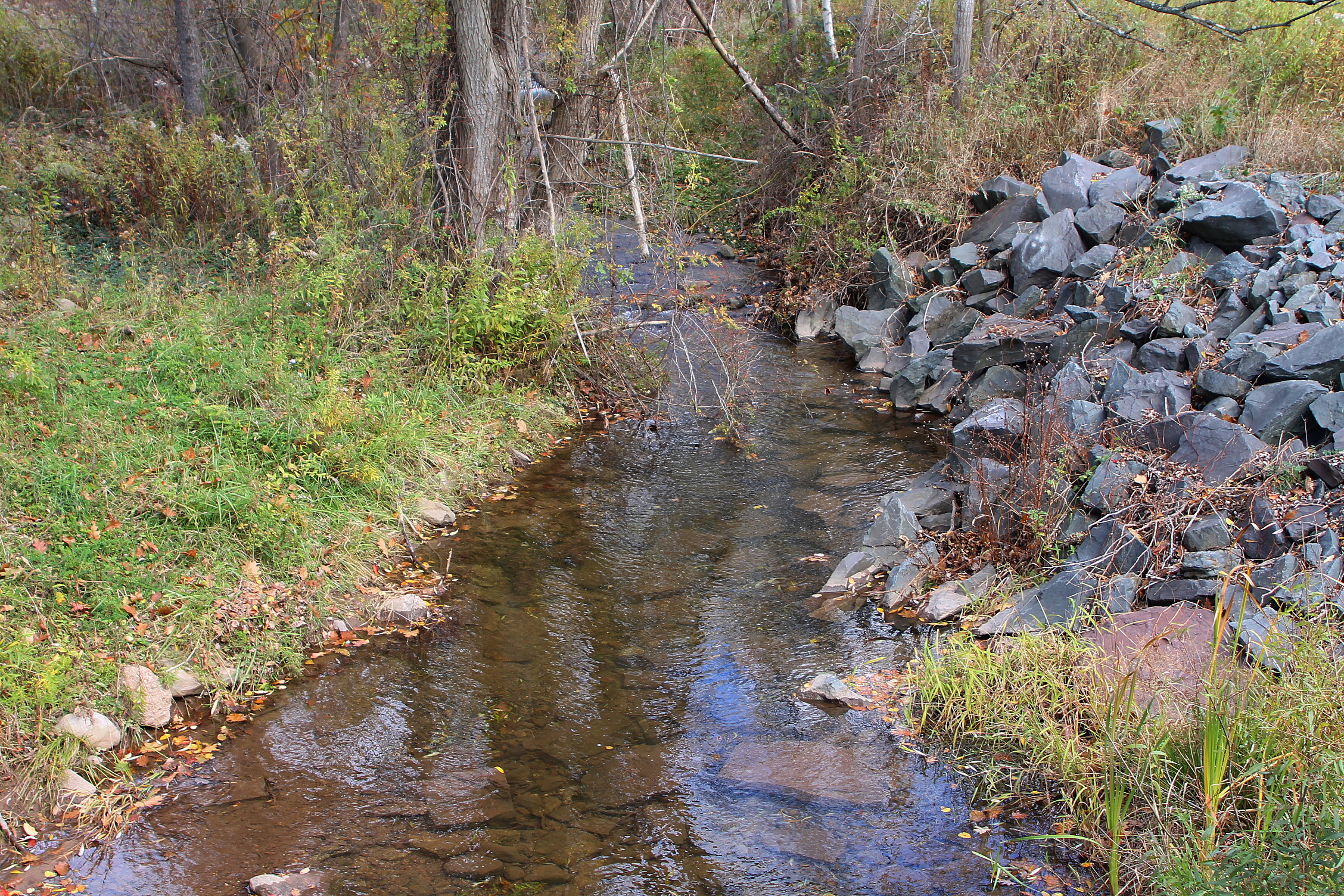
Raccoon Creek looking upstream in Nuremberg, Pennsylvania

Raccoon Creek begins in a valley between Little Sugarloaf Mountain and another ridge in Black Creek Township, Luzerne County. It flows roughly west and within a few tenths of a mile, passes through the community of Weston. Upon exiting Weston, the creek continues west for more than a mile before turning southwest and leaving Black Creek Township and Luzerne County.

Upon exiting Luzerne County, Raccoon Creek enters North Union Township, Schuylkill County. It continues southwest on the border of Nuremberg. The valley gets narrower as the creek flows through North Union Township and the creek eventually reaches its confluence with Tomhicken Creek.

Raccoon Creek joins Tomhicken Creek 3.40 miles (5.47 km) upstream of its mouth.

== Hydrology ==
The alkalinity concentration in the waters of Raccoon Creek is 20 milligrams per liter. The pH of the creek is 7.0. Its water hardness is 36 milligrams per liter. The water chemistry is affected by human development in the area.

On 1:00 P.M. on July 11, 1997, the air temperature in the vicinity of Raccoon Creek was measured to be 28 °C (82 °F). The water temperature of the creek was measured to be 16.8 °C (62.2 °F) at that time. The specific conductivity of the creek's waters is 129 umhos.

== Geography and geology ==
The elevation near the mouth of Raccoon Creek is 902 feet (275 m) above sea level. The elevation near the stream's source is slightly over 1,240 feet (380 m) above sea level.

The entire length of the watershed of Raccoon Creek is on rock of the Mauch Chunk Formation. However, the northern edge of the watershed has rock of the Pottsville Formation. The entire length of the creek is on Leck Kill soil.

The headwaters of Raccoon Creek are between Little Sugarloaf Mountain and South Buck Mountain.

Raccoon Creek is a small stream, with a width of 2.2 metres (7.2 ft). It has a moderate gradient of 19.9 meters per kilometer. The creek has been known to overflow its banks and flood nearby homes.

== Watershed ==
The watershed of Raccoon Creek has an area of 2.67 square miles (6.9 km^{2}). The watershed is mostly in Black Creek Township, Luzerne County, but a substantial portion is in North Union Township, Schuylkill County. Most of the lower reaches of the stream (in Schuylkill County) are in agricultural land. Additionally, there are two areas of developed land in the upper reaches of the watershed: the communities of Nuremberg and Weston.

The main roads in the watershed of Raccoon Creek include Mahanoy Street, Main Street, and Weston Road. The community of Nuremberg is in the northeastern portion of the watershed. 43 percent of the length of Raccoon Creek is within 100 metres (330 ft) of a road. 99 percent of the creek is within 300 metres (980 ft) of a road and all of the creek is within 500 metres (1,600 ft) of one.

Raccoon Creek is in the United States Geological Survey quadrangle of Nuremberg.

== History and recreation ==
In 2011, the Department of Community and Economic Development gave Black Creek Township, Luzerne County a $10,000 grant to do a study of Raccoon Creek. The purpose of the study was to reduce the effect that the creek's flooding had on nearby residential areas and also to stabilize the stream's banks.

The North Union Township Park is in the vicinity of Raccoon Creek.

== Biology ==
Raccoon Creek is considered by the Pennsylvania Department of Environmental Protection to be a High-Quality Coldwater Fishery, although it was historically considered by be only a Coldwater Fishery. It is also considered by the Pennsylvania Fish and Boat Commission to be Class A Wild Trout Waters for brook trout between its headwaters and its mouth.

Seven species of fish inhabit Raccoon Creek. These include brook trout and largemouth bass, but the latter most likely escaped from nearby farm ponds. Trout naturally reproduce in the stream between its headwaters and its mouth. The biomass of brook trout in the creek is 65.55 kilograms per hectare, although this figure may include stocked trout. 8.85 kilograms per hectare come from brook trout less than 175 millimeters long and 56.70 kilograms per hectare come from brook trout more than 175 millimeters long. The length of these trout range from 50 to 299 millimeters. None between 100 and 149 millimeters long have been observed, but a large number longer than 200 millimeters have.

A 1997 survey observed 335 brook trout per kilometer that were less than 175 millimeters long and 120 brook trout per kilometer that were more than 175 millimeters long. There were 1434 brook trout per hectare that were less than 175 millimeters long and 515 brook trout per hectare that were more than 175 millimeters long.

A 1997 report stated that Raccoon Creek was an excellent site for angling.

== See also ==
- Little Crooked Run, next tributary of Tomhicken Creek going upstream
