= Barnes Run =

Barnes Run Barnes Run Creek

Physical characteristics
- Source
  - location: Northern side of a mountain in Black Creek Township, Pennsylvania
  - elevation: Between 1,460 and 1,480 feet (450 and 450 m)
- Mouth
  - location: Black Creek in Black Creek Township, Pennsylvania
  - coordinates: 40°58′56″N 76°11′02″W
  - elevation: 758 ft (231 m)
- Length: 2.2 mi (3.5 km)

Basin features
- Progression: Black Creek → Nescopeck Creek → Susquehanna River → Chesapeake Bay

Barnes Run (also known as Barnes Run Creek) is a tributary of Black Creek in Luzerne County, Pennsylvania. It is approximately 2.2 miles (3.5 km) long and flows through Black Creek Township. The stream has been used as a water supply for portions of Hazleton and some surrounding areas. It is designated as a Coldwater Fishery and wild trout naturally reproduce within it.

== Course ==
Barnes Run begins on the northern side of a mountain in Black Creek Township. It flows west for several tenths of a mile before turning north for nearly a mile. After several tenths of a mile, it leaves the mountain and crosses Rock Glen Road. The stream then turns west-northwest for several tenths of a mile, passing near the Sugarloaf Golf Course and flowing through a series of ponds. A short distance downstream of the ponds, it reaches its confluence with Black Creek.

== Geography and geology ==
The elevation near the mouth of Barnes Run is 758 feet (231 m) above sea level. The elevation near the stream's source is between 1,460 and 1,480 feet (450 and 450 m) above sea level. Barnes Run is in the ridge and valley physiographic province.

The Barnes Run collecting dam has a capacity of 30,000 US gallons (110,000 L; 25,000 imp gal).

== Watershed ==
Barnes Run is entirely within the United States Geological Survey quadrangle of Nuremberg. The stream is not considered to be a major stream.

The Pennsylvania Department of Environmental Protection opted not to recognize the watershed of Barnes Run as a "high quality watershed" with the potential to be affected by development. One proposed route for the Susquehanna-Roseland 500 kV Transmission Line crosses Barnes Run.

Barnes Run is one of eleven officially named streams in the watershed of Nescopeck Creek that has not been assessed by the Pennsylvania Fish and Boat Commission.

== History ==
Barnes Run was entered into the Geographic Names Information System on January 1, 1990. Its identifier in the Geographic Names Information System is 1202218. The stream was added because of its appearance on the Atlas of the Anthracite Coalfields of Pennsylvania, which was published in 1888.

The Barnes Run Reservoir was constructed in 1912. It is dammed by an earth dam with a masonry core wall and a cut-stone spillway. In 1964, it was noted in the Standard-Speaker that the reservoir rarely ran dry.

Barnes Run has been one of several streams used as a water supply in Hazleton. It and two other streams (Wolffs Run and Stony Creek) supplied water to as many as 14,400 people in 1974. In the early 1900s, Barnes Run and Wolffs Run made up 25 percent of the water supply of Hazleton. In 1963, Barnes Run was one of ten suppliers of water to Hazleton. It also supplied water to West Hazleton and Humboldt.

== Biology ==
Barnes Run is designated as a Coldwater Fishery. Wild trout naturally reproduce in Barnes Run from its headwaters downstream to its mouth. The Pennsylvania Fish and Boat Commission considered adding the stream to its list of Wild Trout Waters in a meeting on April 11 and April 12, 2012.

Giardia Cysts were observed in the Barnes Run Reservoir in February 1986.

== See also ==
- Scotch Run (Black Creek), next tributary of Black Creek going downstream
- Falls Run, next tributary of Black Creek going upstream
- List of rivers of Pennsylvania
