= Cranberry Creek =

Cranberry Creek may refer to:

- Cranberry Creek (Blanchard River), a stream in Ohio
- Cranberry Creek (Stony Creek tributary), a stream in Pennsylvania
- Cranberry Creek (Yellow River tributary), a stream in Wisconsin
- Cranberry Creek (Lake Erie), a watershed administered by the Long Point Region Conservation Authority, that drains into Lake Erie

== See also ==
- Cranberry Run
