= Falls Run =

Physical characteristics
- Source
  - location: valley on Buck Mountain in Beaver Township, Columbia County, Pennsylvania
  - elevation: between 1,020 and 1,040 feet (310 and 320 m)
- Mouth
  - location: Black Creek in Black Creek Township, Luzerne County, Pennsylvania
  - coordinates: 40°58′27″N 76°11′05″W
  - elevation: 801 ft (244 m)
- Length: 3.1 mi (5.0 km)
- Basin size: at least 2.44 square miles (6.3 km^{2})

Basin features
- Progression: Black Creek → Nescopeck Creek → Susquehanna River → Chesapeake Bay

Falls Run is a tributary of Black Creek in Columbia County and Luzerne County, in Pennsylvania, in the United States. It is approximately 3.1 miles (5.0 km) long and flows through Beaver Township in Columbia County and Black Creek Township in Luzerne County. The watershed of the stream has an area of at least 2.44 square miles (6.3 km^{2}). The stream was historically used as a water supply and one bridge crosses it. It is in the vicinity of Buck Mountain.

== Course ==
Falls Run begins in a valley on Buck Mountain in Beaver Township, Columbia County. It flows east for more than a mile in the valley before exiting Beaver Township and Columbia County.

Upon exiting Columbia County, Falls Run enters Black Creek Township, Luzerne County and continues flowing east. After several tenths of a mile, the stream turns northeast, leaving the mountain and entering the community of Rock Glen. It then turns north, leaving Rock Glen and flowing alongside Black Creek. Several tenths of a mile further downstream, it reaches its confluence with Black Creek.

== Geography and geology ==
The elevation near the mouth of Falls run is 801 feet (244 m) above sea level. The elevation near the stream's source is between 1,020 and 1,040 feet (310 and 320 m) above sea level.

The mouth of Falls Run is located near Buck Mountain and a hill known as Middle Hill. Part of the stream is situated to the west of a gorge known as the Black Creek Gorge.

An area in the vicinity of Falls Run may overlay the a coal bed known as the Buck Mountain Bed. However, an 1895 book noted that it had not been demonstrated that this was the case.

== Watershed ==
The watershed of Falls Run has an area of at least 2.44 square miles (6.3 km^{2}). Falls Run is entirely within the United States Geological Survey quadrangle of Nuremberg.

Falls Run is one of eleven officially named streams in the watershed of Nescopeck Creek that has not been assessed by the Pennsylvania Fish and Boat Commission.

== History ==
Falls Run was entered into the Geographic Names Information System on January 1, 1990. Its identifier in the Geographic Names Information System is 1202216. It was added because it appeared in the Atlas of the Anthracite Coalfields of Pennsylvania, which was published in 1888. In the early 1800s, the portion of the stream that flowed through Luzerne County was in Sugarloaf Township, not Black Creek Township.

In the early 1900s, Falls Run was used as a water supply for the village of Rock Glen, a mining community that had a population of approximately 300 people at the time. The water supply was at one point owned by the Tomhicken Water Company before later being owned by the Wyoming Water Company. It was used as a domestic water supply in Rock Glen. The Pennsylvania Railroad also used the stream as a water supply. The water was supplied to it via gravity.

A stone arch bridge over Falls Run was proposed as early as 1906. It was to be on the road from Rock Glen to Conyngham and would have cost $550. A concrete slab bridge carrying T-309/Park Street was constructed across Falls Run in 1936. It is 24.0 feet (7.3 m) long and is situated near the intersection with State Route 3020.

== See also ==
- Barnes Run, next tributary of Black Creek going downstream
- Stony Creek (Black Creek), next tributary of Black Creek going upstream
- List of rivers of Pennsylvania
