= Scotch Run =

Scotch Run may refer to:

- Scotch Run (Black Creek), a stream in Luzerne County, Pennsylvania
- Scotch Run (Catawissa Creek), a stream in Columbia County, Pennsylvania

== See also ==
- Scotch Creek (disambiguation)
