= Long Is the Road =

Long Is the Road may refer to:

- Long Is the Road (film), a 1948 German film
- "Long Is the Road (Américain)", a 1984 song by Jean-Jacques Goldman

== See also ==
- Long Road (disambiguation)
