= Zulfiqar Shah =

Pakistani activist (born 1977)

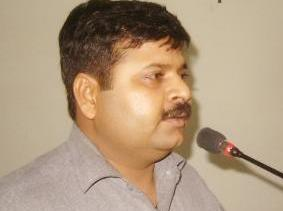
- Born: 1 January 1977 (age 49); Radhan, Dadu, Sindh
- Organization: Involuntarily closed downThe Institute for Social Movements, Pakistan
- Movement: Peasants and National Rights Movement in Sindh (Sindh Peasants Long March for land Reforms in 2009). Minority Rights movement in Sindh during 2011.

Zulfiqar Shah (Sindhi ذوالفقار شاہ Hindi जुल्फिकार शाह) is a civil rights activist, journalist and writer of Sindhi origin. He was forced by the Pakistan Army to unlawfully leave the country and close down the Institute for Social Movements, Pakistan in May 2012. He resettled in Nepal, where the UNHCR approved him for refugee status. In Kathmandu, he began freelancing with newspapers and websites on the issues of Pakistan, particularly concerning Sindh and the restive province of Balochistan. He was insurrected in his house in Kathmandu and was given heavy metal poison by the Pakistani intelligence agency ISI with local facilitation; however he was rescued by local doctors. He was forced to leave Nepal, thus he left for Pakistan in December 2013. In Pakistan, he again was persecuted and threatened to be killed. He went to India for medical treatment on 11 February 2013, where he was not only denied appropriate health treatment at the behest of the Pakistan High Commission in New Delhi, but was also harassed by high commission officials. He, along his wife Fatima Shah, staged a protest sit-in for 285 days near the Indian Parliament in defiance of the threats against his life committed by the Pakistan High Commission and its facilitation by the Indian authorities.

On his website, Shah has claimed that he and his wife Ghulam Fatima Shah were inserted a gadget / chip in their body by USA and India on the demand of Pakistan. He has also claimed that through that chip he has been tortured and attempts of murders were made by Pakistani officials.

Shah was born in a rural town Radhan of district Dadu, Sindh province in Pakistan. Formally educated in Philosophy as well as Development Studies, he was executive director at the Institute for Social Movements, Pakistan and editor of the journal The Social Movements during 2010 – 2012.

Previously he led the Sindh province chapter of South Asia Partnership Pakistan. He has also served at the University of Karachi as a Coordinator for National Institute of Excellence of Higher Education, a project by PEP Foundation, and was Program Manager with Pakistan Fisherfolk Forum. He has been engaged with political and democratic rights activism and Social movements in Sindh for the last two decades.

== Activism ==
Shah was engaged in child rights activism in Sindh during 1988–1994. Later on, he played an active role in the working class rights, national and ethnic liberties and democratic rights.

During 2004–2006, he played an important role in strengthening coastal communities movement for livelihood, ecological and water rights of the Indus River Delta region.

He is vocal for secularism, civil democratic rule in Pakistan with the minimised role of non-civil actors in the statecraft and policies and always attempting to create peace and 'one Southasia' constituency among the opinion makers and activists in Sindh.

Since 2006, he is organising and actively advocating peasants' rights movement in Sindh. In February 2009, he organised and led Sindh Peasants Long March for the land rights from Hyderabad to Sindh Assembly, Karachi that was participated by the thousands of peasants from across the province and was carried out for 12 days through 350 kilometres. He has been staunch advocate for land reforms in Pakistan.

Shah has also been actively engaged in the civil society's initiatives against enforced disappearances in Sindh and Baluchistan and victimisation of peasants rights activists and agriculture labourers. He, at various times, due to his bold stance has been persecuted by the various state and non-state factors. He was also part of the civil society peace initiatives for peace in South Asia, particularly between Pakistan and India.

In the recent wave of extremist violence in Pakistan after the murder of Salman Taseer, a staunch leader of Pakistan People's Party and Governor of Punjab, he along with many other civil society and peace activists initiated and strengthened peace activism in interior Sindh. He also facilitated and convened the Movement for Peace & Tolerance, Pakistan that is engaging rural Sindh activists in the pro peace movement. In November 2011, he along with civil society activists from across the province launched a massive campaign against forced conversions, abductions and targeted murders of Hindus and other religious minorities in Sindh.

The 'Great Flood of Pakistan' 2010 victimised beyond 7 million people from various districts of Sindh and more than 5 million people became internally displaced persons. Shah along with other activists facilitated quick support regarding the medical relief in the 12 districts of Sindh. Previously, he facilitated the rain floods of 2007 that almost inundated Hyderabad city, the second largest city of the province. He is also engaged in the flood victims and IDPs rights advocacy.

== Books and publications ==
Shah has written several books:

- Shah, Zulfiqar (2014). Decline of Pakistan. CreateSpace Independent Publishing Platform. ISBN 9781502565907.
- Shah, Zulfiqar (2013). Beyond Federalism: A Sociopolitical Treatise on Sindhi Nationalism in India (1843–1947) and Pakistan (1947–2012). LAP LAMBERT Academic. ISBN 9783659464348.
- Shah, Zulfiqar (2014). Politics of Afghan Future. Lap Lambert Academic Publishing GmbH KG. ISBN 9783659553820.

His research studies and papers include "Indus Delta-An Environmental Assessment", "Race and Ethnicity in South Asia", "History of Sindhi Nationalism", and "Roots of Jainism in Sindh", besides many others. His book Indus Delta: An Environmental Assessment, and the booklet Water, People & Protests were published in 2005 and 2003, respectively.

Shah was associated with Daily Kawish, the largest daily newspaper in Sindh from 1996 to 1998. He has contributed to several hundred columns, articles and research papers in both the Sindhi- and English-languages in newspapers, magazines and websites based in Pakistan, Nepal, India, the United States, Russia, the United Kingdom, Hong Kong, Germany and Afghanistan that include The Kathmandu Post, Truthout, The Descrier, UK, Russia Direct, Moscow, daily Afghanistan Times, Kabul, daily Dawn, Karachi, daily The News, Karachi, weekly The Friday Times, Lahore, monthly Newsline, Karachi, daily Kawish and daily Ibrat, Hyderabad, Merinews, The Social Movements; daily Republica, Nepal and daily Outlook Afghanistan, Kabul.

== Affiliation ==
Zulfiqar Shah is associated with IAES deemed University India. He was a member of Bangladesh Bharat Pakistan Peoples Forum and International Society for Philosophers, Sheffield University, UK. He was also an ordinary member of the International Institute of Strategic Studies during 2009–2011.
