= Long Walk =

Long Walk, A Long Walk or The Long Walk may refer to:

== Historical events ==
- Long Walk of the Navajo, the 1864 deportation and attempted ethnic cleansing of the Navajo people by the U.S. Government
- The Long Walk, an annual event and charity inspired by Michael Long's 2004 walk to Canberra to highlight Indigenous Australian issues
- The March (1945), also known as the Long Walk, westward marches by groups of Allied POWs from German camps during the final stages of World War II in Europe

== Media ==
=== Film and television ===
- A Long Walk (film), a 2006 Japanese film
- The Long Walk (2019 film), a Laotian film
- The Long Walk (2025 film), an American dystopian thriller film based on the 1979 novel

=== Literature ===
- The Long Walk (novel), a novel by Stephen King (under the pseudonym Richard Bachman) published in 1979
- The Long Walk: A Story of War and the Life That Follows (2013), a memoir by Iraq War veteran Brian Castner
- The Long Walk: The True Story of a Trek to Freedom (1956), a memoir by Polish author Sławomir Rawicz

=== Music ===
- "A Long Walk" (song), a 2001 song by Jill Scott
- The Long Walk (album), 2018 album by Uniform

== Places ==
- The Long Walk, a straight tree-lined avenue primarily in Windsor Great Park in Windsor, England, U.K.
- The Long Walk, a promenade to one side of the Spanish Arch in Galway, Ireland
- Trinity College Long Walk, the core of Trinity College in Hartford, Connecticut, U.S.

== See also ==
- Lone walk, the traditional exit by the Governor of Massachusetts from the Massachusetts State House on his or her last day in office
- Long March (disambiguation)
- The Long Run (disambiguation)
- Long Walk to Forever (disambiguation)
- Long Walk to Freedom (disambiguation)
- Long Walk Home (disambiguation)
