= Institute for Social Movements, Pakistan =

Pakistani research institute

The Institute for Social Movements, Pakistan (ISM) (Sindhi: انسٽيٽيوٽ فار سوشل موومينٽس پاڪستان | Urdu: ﺍﻧﺴﭩﻴﭩﻮﭦ ﻓﺎﺭ ﺳﻮ ﺷﻞ ﻣﻮﻭﻣﻴﻨﭧ ﭘﺎﻛﺴﺘﺎﻥ | Hindi: सामाजिक आंदोलनों के लिए संस्थान) was first of its kind of institution in Sindh, Pakistan that clubbed together social movements studies, activism and research. Established by prominent activists, journalists, development professionals and academics from across Sindh, ISM was primarily active in almost all districts of Sindh and Sindh bordering districts of Balochistan. The Institute was established in Hyderabad in March 2010 after several deliberations held in Karachi, Hyderabad, Umerkot and Sukkur; however due to its important role in supporting civil, political, minorities and land rights in Sindh and Balochistan, ISM was involuntarily closed down on the pressure and threats by Pakistan Army associated intelligence agencies ISI and Military Intelligence on May 29, 2012. The founding directors of the ISM Zulfiqar Shah and his wife Fatima Shah were persecuted, harassed and threatened to death, and were asked to leave Pakistan, who left the country on May 30, 2012 and sought asylum with UNHCR in Nepal, which was granted to them.

ISM played an important role along with other civil society organizations in the Indus River Floods in Sindh by supporting flood victims and internally displaced persons (IDPs) and advocating IDPs rights in Sindh, however, the organization had a prominent recent past in the substantive democratic initiatives and rights activism around political, minorities', peasants and women rights in Sindh.

The organization was led by its founding executive director Zulfiqar Shah.

ISM Logo.

== Democratic rights ==
ISM played a leading role in land rights movement in Sindh and Balochistan in 2010-11; movement against religious extremism in 2011 as well as political and civil rights in Sindh. It also was the leading forum vocal for the rights of disaster victims in Sindh.

Besides rights activism as well as mobilization and consultative process over XVIII Constitutional Amendment, ISM is a joint petitioner of a constitutional petition along with pro democracy individuals, civil society and political leaders and national level civil society organizations in the supreme court of Pakistan.

== Role in the flood emergency response ==
ISM facilitated relief particularly medical support in 12 flood affected districts of Sindh and some parts of Baluchistan. It was also working on IDP rights, facilitating joint forums over disaster management and IDPs issues in Sindh and issue concerning education and IDPs education concerns, with the organizing consultative and coordinative forums over the issues.

Indus Flood Relief Fund

HIMAL Southasian, a well reputed analytical magazine and The South Asian Trust, Nepal established Indus Flood Relief Fund to support the flood victims in Pakistan. This Initiative was joined by the South Asian Alliance for Poverty Eradication (SAAPE) and NGO Federation of Nepal. The funds generated from the initiatives were decided to be administered by The Institute for Social Movements, Pakistan.
