= A Long Journey =

A Long Journey, Long Journey or The Long Journey may refer to:

- A Long Journey (1967 film)
- A Long Journey (2011 film)
- The Long Journey, a series of six novels by Danish author and poet Johannes V. Jensen

== Music ==
- Long Journey (album), 1976, by American musician Michael Hurley
- A Long Journey, a 1998 album by Ophthalamia
- "Long Journey", a 2023 song by American rapper Rod Wave

== See also ==
- Long Journey Home (disambiguation)
- Long Trip (disambiguation)
- The Longest Journey (disambiguation)
