= Scotch Run (Black Creek tributary) =

Scotch Run Scotch Run Creek

Physical characteristics
- Source
  - location: southern side of Nescopeck Mountain in Black Creek Township, Luzerne County, Pennsylvania
  - elevation: between 940 and 960 feet (290 and 290 m)
- Mouth
  - location: Black Creek in Black Creek Township, Luzerne County, Pennsylvania
  - coordinates: 40°59′36″N 76°11′16″W
  - elevation: 725 ft (221 m)
- Length: 1.6 mi (2.6 km)

Basin features
- Progression: Black Creek → Nescopeck Creek → Susquehanna River → Chesapeake Bay

Scotch Run (also known as Scotch Run Creek is a tributary of Black Creek in Luzerne County, Pennsylvania, in the United States. It is approximately 1.6 miles (2.6 km) long and flows through Black Creek Township. The stream is fed by springs and is located at the base of Nescopeck Mountain. It has not been assessed by the Pennsylvania Fish and Boat Commission.

== Course ==
Scotch Run begins on the southern side of Nescopeck Mountain in Black Creek Township, several hundred feet from the border between Luzerne County and Columbia County. It flows east for a few tenths of a mile and enters a valley. The stream then turns south for a short distance before turning east again. After a few tenths of a mile, it turns east-northeast for several tenths of a mile. It then turns east and crosses a road before reaching its confluence with Black Creek.

== Geography and geology ==
The elevation near the mouth of Scotch Run is 725 feet (221 m) above sea level. The elevation near the source of the stream is between 940 and 960 feet (290 and 290 m) above sea level.

Scotch Run is fed by springs. In 1965, it was noted that the stream had never run dry due to droughts for at least 52 years.

Scotch Run is situated in the vicinity of the southern base of Nescopeck Mountain.

== Watershed ==
Scotch Run is entirely within the United States Geological Survey quadrangle of Nuremberg.

Scotch Run is one of eleven named streams in the watershed of Nescopeck Creek that has not been assessed by the Pennsylvania Fish and Boat Commission.

== History ==
Scotch Run was entered into the Geographic Names Information System on August 1, 1989. Its identifier in the Geographic Names Information System is 1212392. The stream appears on county highway maps published by the Pennsylvania Department of Transportation. It also appears on a 1958 map published by the Pennsylvania Fish Commission.

The first tannery in Black Creek Township was constructed opposite the mouth of Scotch Run. It was situated on a farm that was owned by a person named P. Swoyer in the late 1800s. In 1965, the Hazleton Penn Rod and Gun Club purchased a 35-acre tract of land along the stream.

== See also ==
- Barnes Run, next tributary of Black Creek going upstream
- List of rivers of Pennsylvania
