= Hog Run =

Physical characteristics
- Source
  - location: valley in Davidson Township, Sullivan County, Pennsylvania
  - elevation: between 2,340 and 2,360 feet (710 and 720 m)
- Mouth
  - location: Elk Run in Davidson Township, Sullivan County, Pennsylvania
  - coordinates: 41°19′21″N 76°25′15″W
  - elevation: 1,384 ft (422 m)
- Length: 2.0 mi (3.2 km)
- Basin size: 1.05 mi^{2} (2.7 km^{2})

Basin features
- Progression: Elk Run → West Branch Fishing Creek → Fishing Creek → Susquehanna River → Chesapeake Bay

Hog Run is a tributary of Elk Run in Sullivan County, Pennsylvania, in the United States. It is approximately 2.0 miles (3.2 km) long and flows through Davidson Township. The watershed of the stream has an area of 1.05 square miles (2.7 km^{2}). The stream is considered to be impaired by atmospheric deposition and metals. Wisconsinan Ice-Contact Stratified Drift, Wisconsinan Till, and bedrock consisting of shale and sandstone occur in the stream's vicinity.

== Course ==
Hog Run begins in a valley in Davidson Township. It flows south for several tenths of a mile and its valley deepens. The stream then turns south-southwest for nearly a mile and the valley continues to deepen. It then turns south and then southwest. After a short distance, it reaches its confluence with Elk Run.

Hog Run joins Elk Run 1.46 miles (2.35 km) upstream of its mouth.

== Hydrology ==
A total of 2.02 miles (3.25 km) of Hog Run is considered to be impaired. This is approximately 4.97 percent of all the impaired streams in the watersheds of East Branch Fishing Creek and West Branch Fishing Creek. The cause of the impairment is atmospheric deposition and metals.

Hog Run does not attain the stream standards of the Pennsylvania Department of Environmental Protection.

== Geography and geology ==
The elevation near the mouth of Elk Run is 1,384 feet (422 m) above sea level. The elevation of the stream's source is between 2,340 and 2,360 feet (710 and 720 m) above sea level.

Hog Run is on bedrock consisting of sandstone and shale for nearly all of its length. However, Wisconsinan Ice-Contact Stratified Drift occurs near the stream's mouth. Wisconsinan Ice-Contact Stratified Drift contains stratified sand and gravel, as well as some boulders. A glacial or resedimented till known as the Wisconsinan Till occurs near the headwaters of the stream.

== Watershed ==
The watershed of Hog Run has an area of 1.05 square miles (2.7 km^{2}). The stream is entirely within the United States Geological Survey quadrangle of Elk Grove.

The streambed of Hog Run is publicly owned. It is one of twenty streams in the Upper Susquehanna-Lackawanna drainage basin whose streambed is public property. The streambeds of the two other named tributaries of Elk Run (Long Run and Gallows Run) are also publicly owned, as is the streambed of Elk Run itself.

== History ==
Elk Run was entered into the Geographic Names Information System on August 2, 1979. Its identifier in the Geographic Names Information System is 1177171.

== See also ==
- Long Run (Elk Run), next tributary of Elk Run going downstream
- Gallows Run, next tributary of Elk Run going upstream
- List of tributaries of Fishing Creek (North Branch Susquehanna River)
