= Long March (disambiguation) =

The Long March was the 1934 retreat by the Red Army of the Chinese Communist Party.

Long March may also refer to:

== Marches and protests ==
- Long Walk of the Navajo, the 1864 deportation of the Navajo people by the U.S. federal government
- Little Long March, the 1927 withdrawal by Left-Kuomintang forces after the Nanchang uprising
- Partisan Long March, the 1942 military retreat of the Yugoslav Partisans across Bosnia
- The March (1945), a series of forced marches during the final stages of the Second World War in Europe
- Farakka Long March,1976 protest in Bangladesh led by Abdul Hamid Khan Bhashani against construction of the Farakka Barrage in India
- Long March for Justice, Freedom and Hope, 1988 protest march against the Australian Bicentenary
- Sindh Peasants Long March, 2009
- Long March (Pakistan), a 2013 public protest against alleged governmental corruption
- 2014 retreat from Western Bahr el Ghazal, or the "long march north", in the South Sudanese Civil War
- PPP long march, by Pakistan Peoples Party's Chairman Bilawal Bhutto Zardari in 2022

== Arts and entertainment ==
=== Film and television ===
- Darah dan Doa, or The Long March, a 1950 Indonesian war film
- "The Long March" (American Dad!), a 2019 TV episode
- "The Long March" (Playhouse 90), a TV play

=== Literature ===
- The Long March (novel), by William Styron, 1956
- The Long March, a 1957 book by Simone de Beauvoir

=== Music ===
- The Long March (album), by Max Roach and Archie Sheep, 1979
- The Long March EP, by Blue Scholars, 2005
- A Long March: The First Recordings, a 2006 album by As I Lay Dying

== Other uses ==
- Long March (rocket family), Chinese expendable launch system rockets
- Long march through the institutions, a slogan for socialist strategy in West Germany coined by Rudi Dutschke around 1967

== See also ==
- Death march (disambiguation)
- The Long Run (disambiguation)
- Long Walk (disambiguation)
