= Gallows Run =

Tributary of Elk Run in Sullivan County, Pennsylvania

Physical characteristics
- Source
  - location: top of a valley in Davidson Township, Sullivan County, Pennsylvania
  - elevation: between 2,180 and 2,200 feet (660 and 670 m)
- Mouth
  - location: Elk Run in Davidson Township, Sullivan County, Pennsylvania
  - coordinates: 41°20′15″N 76°25′51″W
  - elevation: 1,604 ft (489 m)
- Length: 0.7 mi (1.1 km)
- Basin size: 0.50 mi^{2} (1.3 km^{2})

Basin features
- Progression: Elk Run → West Branch Fishing Creek → Fishing Creek → Susquehanna River → Chesapeake Bay

Gallows Run is a tributary of Elk Run in Sullivan County, Pennsylvania, in the United States. It is approximately 0.7 miles (1.1 km) long and flows through Davidson Township. The watershed of the stream has an area of 0.50 square miles (1.3 km^{2}). The stream meets the standards of the Pennsylvania Department of Environmental Protection. Wisconsinan Till, Wisconsinan Bouldery Till, and bedrock consisting of sandstone and shale occur in the vicinity of the stream. There is also a patch of wetland in the area.

== Course ==
Gallows Run begins at the top of a valley in Davidson Township. It flows southeast for a short distance. The stream then turns east-southeast for a few tenths of a mile, steeply descending in its valley. At the end of the valley, it reaches its confluence with Elk Run.

Gallows Run joins Elk Run 2.68 miles (4.31 km) upstream of its mouth.

== Hydrology ==
Gallows Run attains the stream standards of the Pennsylvania Department of Environmental Protection. It is designated by the Pennsylvania Department of Environmental Protection for use for aquatic life.

== Geography and geology ==
The elevation near the mouth of Gallows Run is 1,604 feet (489 m) above sea level. The elevation near the stream's source is between 2,180 and 2,200 feet (660 and 670 m) above sea level.

For most of its length, Gallows Run flows over bedrock consisting of shale and sandstone. However, Wisconsinan Bouldery Till occurs near the stream's mouth. Wisconsinan Bouldery Till is a glacial or resedimented till that contains numerous boulders consisting of sandstone, quartz, and conglomerate. Another glacial or resedimented till, Wisconsinan Till, occurs in the upper reaches of the watershed.

== Watershed ==
The watershed of Elk Run has an area of 0.50 square miles (1.3 km^{2}). The stream is entirely within the United States Geological Survey quadrangle of Elk Grove.

There is a patch of wetland near the headwaters of Gallows Run.

The streambed of Gallows Run is publicly owned. It is one of only twenty such streams in the Upper Susquehanna-Lackawanna drainage basin. Two of the other three (Hog Run and Long Run) are also tributaries of Elk Run. Additionally, the streambed of Elk Run itself is publicly owned.

== History ==
Gallows Run was entered into the Geographic Names Information System on August 2, 1979. Its identifier in the Geographic Names Information System is 1175399.

== See also ==
- Hog Run, next tributary of Elk Run going downstream
- List of tributaries of Fishing Creek (North Branch Susquehanna River)
