= Long Run (Cranberry Creek tributary) =

Coordinates: 40°57′08″N 76°01′23″W

Physical characteristics
- Source
  - location: hill just north of Harwood in Hazle Township, Luzerne County, Pennsylvania
  - elevation: between 1,620 and 1,640 feet (490 and 500 m)
- Mouth
  - location: Cranberry Creek in Hazle Township, Luzerne County, Pennsylvania
  - elevation: 1,535 ft (468 m)
- Length: 0.5 mi (0.80 km)

Basin features
- Progression: Cranberry Creek → Stony Creek → Black Creek → Nescopeck Creek → Susquehanna River → Chesapeake Bay

Long Run is a tributary of Cranberry Creek in Luzerne County, Pennsylvania, in the United States. It is approximately 0.5 miles (0.80 km) long and flows through Hazle Township. The stream is in the Eastern Middle Anthracite Field and a number of anticlinals are situated near it. In the early 1900s, it was a clear stream with a slight sulfur contamination. Coal is found in the stream's vicinity.

== Course ==
Long Run has no flow for its entire length. It begins on a hill just north of Harwood, to the north of Pennsylvania Route 924 and to the east of Interstate 81. The stream flows north for a few tenths of a mile, flowing off the hill and into a valley. It continues flowing north for a short distance, passing several small ponds. The stream then reaches its confluence with Cranberry Creek.

Long Run arrives at its confluence with Cranberry Creek on the latter creek's left bank.

== Hydrology ==
Long Run was described as being a clear stream in a 1916 report by the Pennsylvania Water Supply Commission. However, the same report noted that the stream had traces of sulfur contamination within its waters. This was due to the fact that the stream flowed over a coal outcrop.

== Geography and geology ==
The elevation near the mouth of Long Run is 1,535 feet (468 m) above sea level. The elevation of the stream's source is between 1,620 and 1,640 feet (490 and 500 m) above sea level.

An anticlinal known as Cranberry Ridge crosses the headwaters of Long Run. An anticlinal known as Tomhicken Ridge is situated to the north of the stream. The stream is in the Hazleton Basin, which is the largest coal basin in the Eastern Middle Anthracite Field.

Long Run flows over an outcrop of coal in one location. There are coal measures near the source of the stream.

== Watershed ==
Long Run is entirely within the United States Geological Survey quadrangle of Conyngham. Pennsylvania Route 924 and Interstate 81 are near the headwaters of the stream. The communities of Hollars Hill, Harwood, and Green Ridge are all within a mile (two kilometers) of it.

Long Run is one of eleven officially named streams in the watershed of Nescopeck Creek that has not been assessed by the Pennsylvania Fish and Boat Commission.

== See also ==
- List of rivers of Pennsylvania
