= Elk Run (West Branch Fishing Creek tributary) =

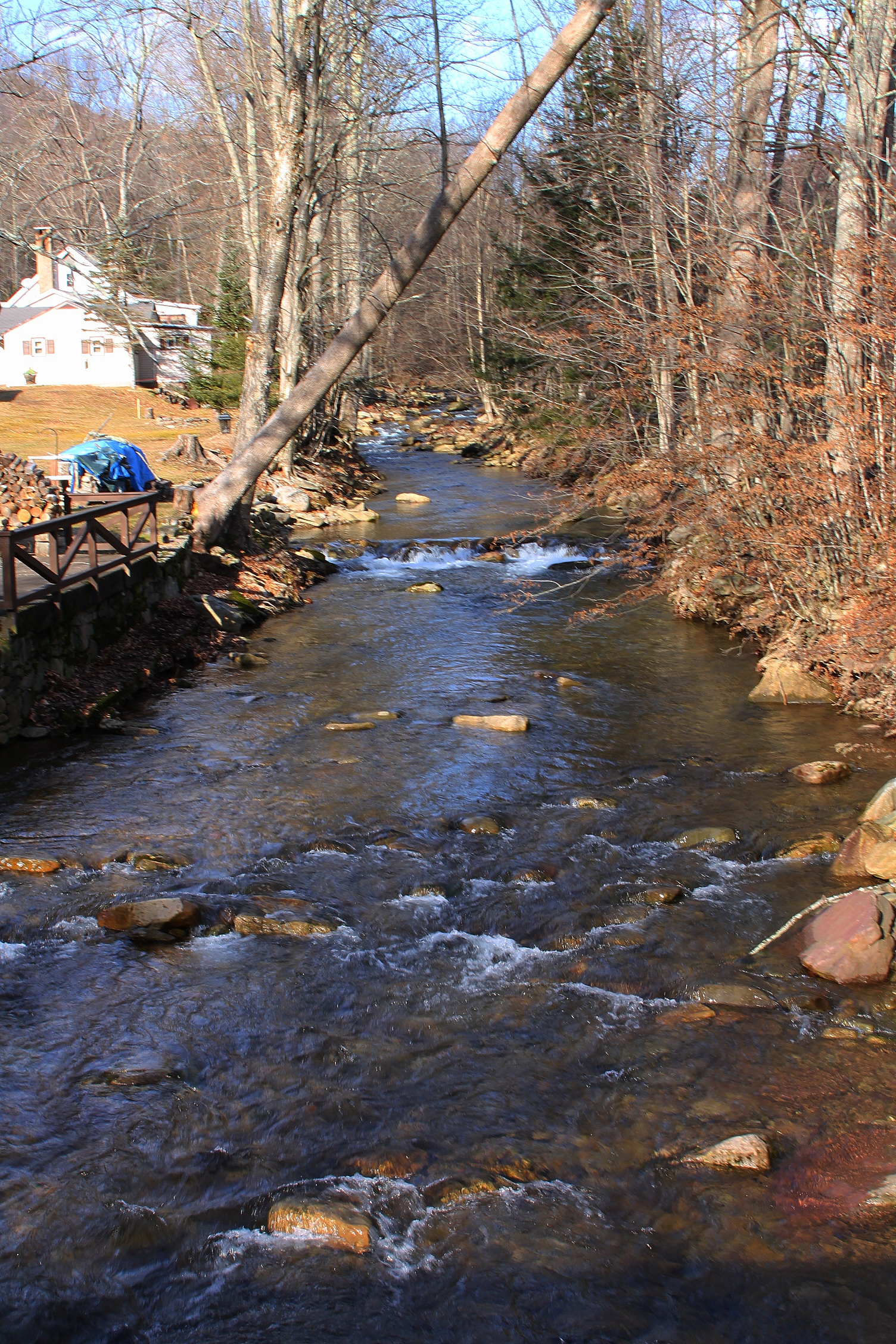
- Elk Run looking upstream in Elk Grove

Physical characteristics
- Source
  - location: northern edge of North Mountain in northern Davidson Township, Sullivan County, Pennsylvania
  - elevation: between 2,240 and 2,280 feet (680 and 690 m)
- Mouth
  - location: West Branch Fishing Creek in Davidson Township, Sullivan County, Pennsylvania
  - coordinates: 41°18′20″N 76°24′23″W
  - elevation: 1,171 ft (357 m)
- Length: 4.8 mi (7.7 km)
- Basin size: 7.49 mi^{2} (19.4 km^{2})

Basin features
- Progression: West Branch Fishing Creek → Fishing Creek → Susquehanna River → Chesapeake Bay
- Tributaries
  - left: Gallows Run
  - right: Hog Run, Long Run

Elk Run is a tributary of West Branch Fishing Creek in Sullivan County and Columbia County, in Pennsylvania. It is approximately 4.8 miles (7.7 km) long and flows through Davidson Township in Sullivan County and Sugarloaf Township in Columbia County. The watershed of the stream has an area of 7.49 square miles (19.4 km^{2}). The stream has three named tributaries: Gallows Run, Hog Run, and Long Run. Elk Run is considered to be an Exceptional Value stream and a Migratory Fishery. The forests surrounding it are deemed by the Sullivan County Natural Areas Inventory to be a "locally significant" area. The stream is named for an elk that was killed in it in the 1840s.

Elk Run is considered to be impaired by atmospheric deposition for a portion of its length. Glacial activity occurred near the stream during the Wisconsinan Glaciation. Wisconsinan Ice-Contract Stratified Drift, Wisconsinan Bouldery Till, Wisconsinan Till, and alluvium can be found near the stream. A bridge was constructed over it in 2000.

== Course ==
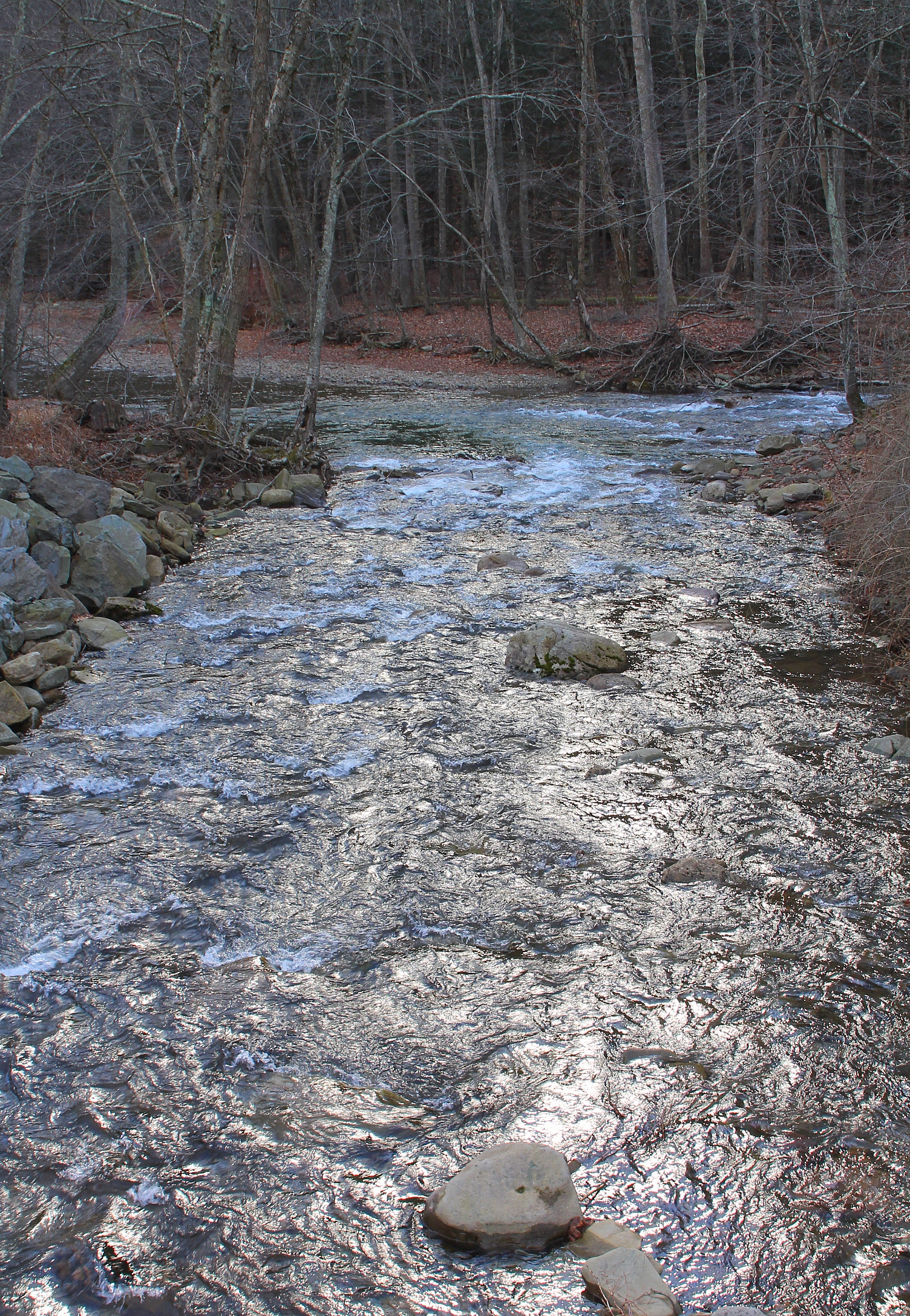
The mouth of Elk Run

Elk Run begins on the northern edge of North Mountain in northern Davidson Township, Sullivan County. It flows southeast for a short distance before entering a deep valley and receiving an unnamed tributary from the left. The stream then turns south-southwest and its valley deepens. After some distance, it receives its first named tributary, Gallows Run, from the right. The stream then turns south-southeast. Over the next few miles, it receives the tributaries Hog Run and Long Run from the left. It then reaches the village of Elk Grove and exits Sullivan County.

Upon exiting Sullivan County, Elk Run enters Sugarloaf Township, Columbia County. It continues flowing south-southeast through the village of Elk Grove. After a short distance, the stream reaches its confluence with West Branch Fishing Creek.

Elk Run joins West Branch Fishing Creek 3.64 miles (5.86 km) upstream of its mouth.

=== Tributaries ===
Elk Run has three named tributaries: Gallows Run, Hog Run, and Long Run. Gallows Run joins Elk Run 2.68 miles (4.31 km) upstream of its mouth. Its watershed has an area of 0.50 square miles (1.3 km^{2}). Hog Run joins Elk Run 1.46 miles (2.35 km) upstream of its mouth. Its watershed has an area of 1.05 square miles (2.7 km^{2}). Long Run joins Elk Run 0.42 miles (0.68 km) upstream of its mouth. Its watershed has an area of 1.92 square miles (5.0 km^{2}).

== Hydrology ==
A total of 0.43 miles (0.69 km) of Elk Run and its unnamed tributaries are considered to be impaired. In Columbia County, 0.1 miles (0.16 km) of the stream is impaired. The cause of the impairment is atmospheric deposition.

== Geography and geology ==
The elevation near the mouth of Elk Run is 1,171 feet (357 m) above sea level. The elevation of the stream's source is between 2,240 and 2,280 feet (680 and 690 m).

Elk Run has a high gradient and is a clearwater creek.

The valley of Elk Run is mostly in the vicinity of Wisconsinan Ice-Contract Stratified Drift, a glacial till known as Wisconsinan Bouldery Till, and alluvium. However, Wisconsinan Till is found near the stream's headwaters. Bedrock consisting of sandstone and shale lines the slopes of the stream's valley. The Ice-Contract Stratified Drift is found in small clumps in the stream's valley, as well as the valley of West Branch Fishing Creek.

During the late Wisconsin glaciation, the location of the headwaters of Elk Run were at the glacial terminus on the northern part of North Mountain. During this glaciation, a tongue of ice flowed down the stream's valley to merge with another tongue of ice in the village of Elk Grove.

== Watershed ==
The watershed of Elk Run has an area of 7.49 square miles (19.4 km^{2}). The stream is entirely within the United States Geological Survey quadrangle of Elk Grove. The part of the stream that is in Columbia County is in northern Sugarloaf Township.

Elk Run is in the headwaters of the watershed of Fishing Creek. It is within Pennsylvania State Game Lands Number 13.

A wetland is located near the headwaters of Elk Run.

== History and etymology ==
Elk Run was entered into the Geographic Names Information System on August 2, 1979. Its identifier in the Geographic Names Information System is 1174123.

A prestressed box beam bridge carrying State Route 4049 over Elk Run in Elk Grove was constructed in 2000. This bridge is 43.0 feet (13.1 m) long. The stream was surveyed by the Pennsylvania Fish and Boat Commission in 1994.

In the 1840s, hunters Benjamin McHenry and Silas Jackson killed an elk in the vicinity of Elk Run. The elk died in the stream. Elk were extremely rare in Columbia County and the elk that was killed in the stream was one of the few in Northeastern Pennsylvania. The stream is named after the elk, making it one of approximately a thousand natural features in the United States to be named after elk.

== Biology ==
Wild trout naturally reproduce in Elk Run between its headwaters and its mouth. The stream is designated as an Exceptional Value stream throughout its entire drainage basin. The stream's basin is also designated as a Migratory Fishery. As of the 1990s, Elk Run's biomass class for wild brook trout is B. The biomass of trout in the stream is more than 20 kilograms per hectare.

A lynx nearly 6 feet (1.8 m) long was observed in the vicinity of Elk Run in around 1900.

A forest community along Elk Run is considered by the Sullivan County Natural Areas Inventory to be "locally significant". It serves as a riparian buffer for the stream. This forest contains trees of varying ages and some have trunks up to more than 1 foot (0.30 m) thick. The slopes in the forest mainly contain sugar maples. However, there are smaller numbers of basswood, beech, hemlock, white ash, and yellow birch. The shrub layer of the forest is described as "well-developed" in the Sullivan County Natural Areas Inventory. It contains elderberry, striped maple, and witch hazel. Herbaceous plants in the area include asters, Christmas ferns, foamflowers, wood sorrels, and others.

== See also ==
- Peterman Run, next tributary of West Branch Fishing Creek going downstream
- Bloody Run (West Branch Fishing Creek), next tributary of West Branch Fishing Creek going upstream
- List of tributaries of Fishing Creek (North Branch Susquehanna River)
