= Mountain Grove, Pennsylvania =

Unincorporated community in Pennsylvania, US

- Unincorporated community
- Location within Pennsylvania Location within the United States
- Coordinates: 40°58′53″N 76°12′39″W
- Country: United States
- State: Pennsylvania
- County: Luzerne
- Township: Black Creek
- Elevation: 1,030 ft (310 m)
- Time zone: UTC-5 (Eastern (EST))
  - Summer (DST): UTC-4 (EDT)
- Area code: 570
- GNIS feature ID: 1181951

Mountain Grove is an unincorporated area in Black Creek Township, Luzerne County, Pennsylvania, United States.
