= Wolffs Run =

Coordinates: 40°56′33″N 76°03′24″W

Physical characteristics
- Source
  - location: southeastern edge of the Humboldt Reservoir in Hazle Township, Luzerne County, Pennsylvania
  - elevation: between 1,760 and 1,780 feet (540 and 540 m)
- Mouth
  - location: Stony Creek in Hazle Township, Luzerne County, Pennsylvania
  - elevation: 1,715 ft (523 m)
- Length: 0.4 mi (0.64 km)
- Basin size: 0.6 sq mi (1.6 km^{2})

Basin features
- Progression: Stony Creek → Black Creek → Nescopeck Creek → Susquehanna River → Chesapeake Bay

Wolffs Run is a tributary of Stony Creek in Luzerne County, Pennsylvania. It is approximately 0.4 miles (0.64 km) long and flows through Hazle Township. The watershed of the stream has an area of 0.6 square miles (1.6 km^{2}). A reservoir known as the Humboldt Reservoir is located on it. The reservoir serves as a water supply and is dammed by the Humboldt Dam.

== Course ==
Wolffs Run begins on the southeastern edge of the Humboldt Reservoir, at the Humboldt Dam in Hazle Township. It flows northeast for several hundred feet before gradually beginning to turn north. After flowing north for a similar distance, it reaches its confluence with Stony Creek.

== Geography and geology ==
The elevation near the mouth of Wolffs Run is 1,715 feet (523 m) above sea level. The elevation of the stream's source is between 1,760 feet (540 m) and 1,780 feet (540 m) above sea level.

There is a dam known as the Humboldt Dam on Wolffs Run. The dam is an earthfill dam with a masonry core wall. The dam is 974 feet (297 m) long and 41 feet (12 m) high. It has a masonry gravity spillway on its right abutment.

There is a reservoir known as the Humboldt Reservoir or the Wolf's Run Reservoir on Wolffs Run. It is owned by the Mt. Pleasant Water Supply Company. The reservoir has a capacity of 144 million US gallons (550 Ml) and a surface area of 35.0 acres (14.2 ha). The reservoir, along with several other nearby reservoirs, served 14,400 people in the 1970s. In the early 1900s, Wolffs Run, together with Barnes Run, supplied 25 percent of the water supply of the city of Hazleton.

== Watershed ==
The watershed of Wolffs Run has an area of 0.6 square miles (1.6 km^{2}). It is part of the Lower North Branch Susquehanna River drainage basin.

== History ==
Wolffs Run was added to the Geographic Names Information System on January 1, 1990. Additionally, the stream is in the Atlas of the Anthracite Coalfields of Pennsylvania.

In 1988, the city administration of Hazleton applied for a $750,000 grant to repair the Humboldt Reservoir on Wolffs Run.

== See also ==
- Cranberry Creek, next tributary of Stony Creek going downstream
