= Weston, Pennsylvania =

Unincorporated community in Pennsylvania, US

- Census-designated place
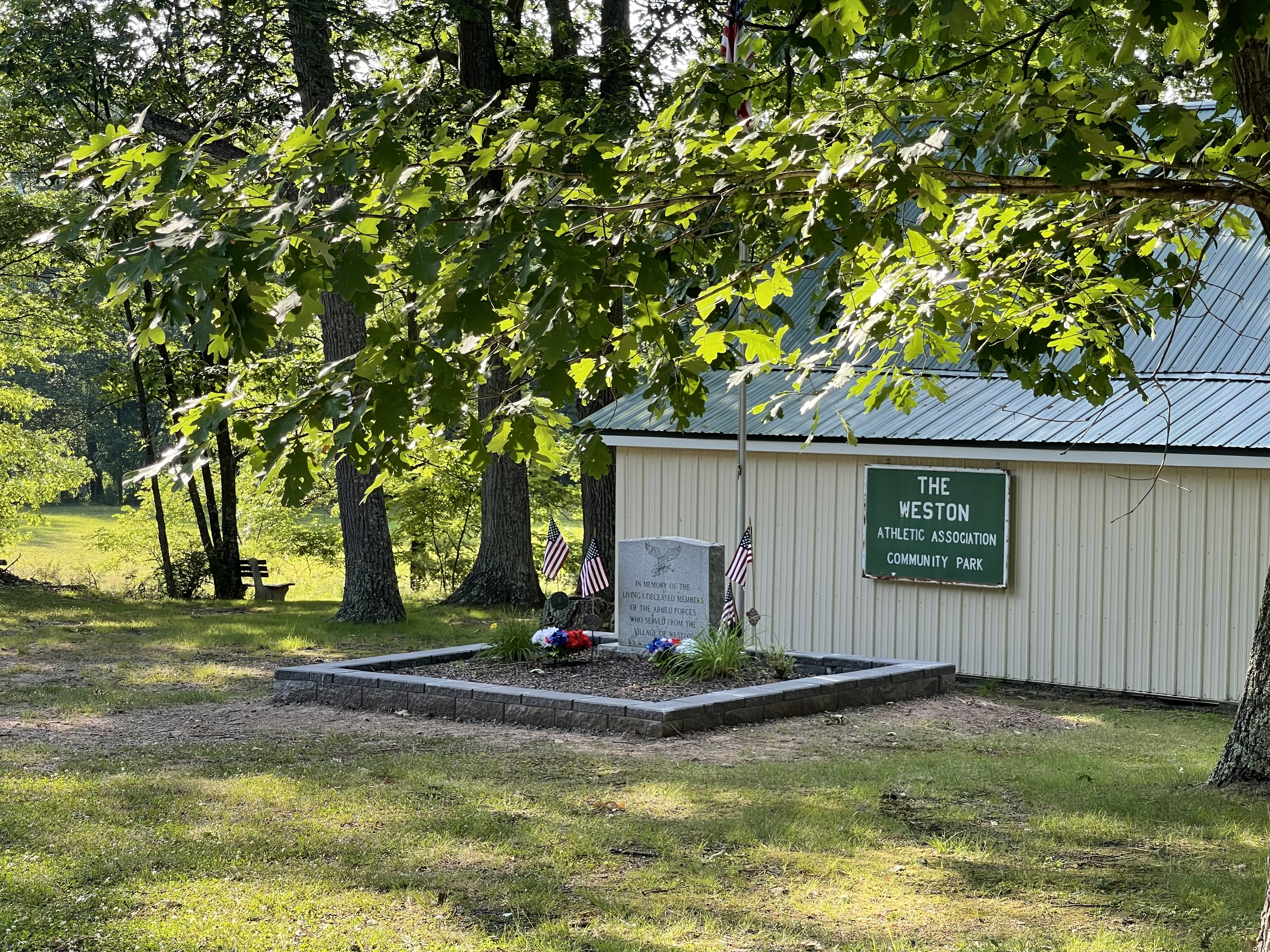
- Weston Athletic Association Community Park

- Location in Pennsylvania Location in the United States
- Coordinates: 40°56′30″N 76°8′32″W
- Country: United States
- State: Pennsylvania
- County: Luzerne
- Township: Black Creek

Area
  - Total: 0.42 sq mi (1.1 km^{2})
  - Land: 0.42 sq mi (1.1 km^{2})
  - Water: 0 sq mi (0 km^{2})

Population (2010)
  - Total: 321
  - Density: 760/sq mi (290/km^{2})
- Time zone: UTC-5 (Eastern (EST))
  - Summer (DST): UTC-4 (EDT)
- Area code: 570

Weston is a census-designated place (CDP) in Black Creek Township, Luzerne County, Pennsylvania, United States. The population was 321 at the 2010 census.

== Geography ==
Weston is located at 40°56′30″N 76°8′32″W, in the southwest corner of Luzerne County. It is less than one mile east of the CDP of Nuremberg and approximately 8 miles (13 km) west of the city of Hazleton.

According to the United States Census Bureau, Weston has a total area of 0.42 square miles (1.1 km^{2}), all land.

== Education ==
The school district is the Hazleton Area School District.
