= Cranberry Creek (Stony Creek tributary) =

River in Pennsylvania, U.S.

Physical characteristics
- Source
  - location: pond in Hazle Township, Columbia County, Pennsylvania
  - elevation: between 1,740 and 1,760 feet (530 and 540 m)
- Mouth
  - location: Stony Creek in Hazle Township, Columbia County, Pennsylvania
  - coordinates: 40°57′54″N 76°01′39″W
  - elevation: 1,460 ft (450 m)
- Length: 4.4 mi (7.1 km)
- Discharge
  - average: 1,502.67 US gallons per minute (0.094804 m^{3}/s) near its mouth

Basin features
- Progression: Stony Creek → Black Creek → Nescopeck Creek → Susquehanna River → Chesapeake Bay
- Tributaries
  - left: Long Run

Cranberry Creek (also known as Grape Run) is a tributary of Stony Creek in Luzerne County, Pennsylvania, in the United States. It is approximately 4.4 miles (7.1 km) long and flows through Hazle Township. The creek is affected by acid mine drainage. It also contains metals such as iron, manganese, and aluminum. It is in the drainage basin of the Jeddo Tunnel. Major roads in the creek's watershed include Pennsylvania Route 924, Pennsylvania Route 309, and Interstate 81. At least one bridge has been built over it. The creek has undergone restoration and there are plans to construct an area known as the Cranberry Creek Gateway Park in its vicinity.

== Course ==
Cranberry Creek begins in a pond in Hazle Township. It flows north for a few tenths of a mile, passing through the Grape Run Reservoir. The creek exits the reservoir on its eastern side and continues flowing north. After approximately a mile, it turns east-northeast for several tenths of a mile. It then turns north and then northwest, passing between the communities of Cranberry and Hollars Hill. Then the creek turns west and crosses Pennsylvania Route 924. It continues west for some distance before turning north and passing between two mountains, flowing parallel to Interstate 81. Some distance later, it receives an unnamed tributary and reaches its confluence with Stony Creek.

== Hydrology ==
A total of 3 miles (4.8 km) of Cranberry Creek is considered to be impaired by acid mine drainage and flow alterations. It is a major source of acid mine drainage to Black Creek. The creek was listed on the list of impaired streams in 2002. A 0.5 miles (0.80 km) is considered to be impaired by acid mine drainage, metals, and pH. This stretch of the creek was added to the list of impaired streams in 2004. Cranberry Creek has a total maximum daily load for aluminum, iron, and acidity. However, it does not have one for manganese.

The concentration of aluminum near the mouth of Cranberry Creek is 0.96 milligrams per liter and the daily load is 17.3 pounds (7.8 kg). The maximum allowable load is 2.0 pounds (0.91 kg) per day. The iron concentration in the creek is 1.83 milligrams per liter and the load is 33.0 pounds (15.0 kg) per day. The maximum allowable load for iron is 3.4 pounds (1.5 kg) per day. The concentration of manganese is 0.24 milligrams per liter and the daily load of it is 4.2 pounds (1.9 kg). The concentration of sulfates in the creek ranges from 8.5 to 13.9 milligrams per liter, with an average concentration of 11.40 milligrams per liter.

The concentration of acidity in Cranberry Creek near its mouth is 6.98 milligrams per liter and the daily load of acidity is 125.9 pounds (57.1 kg). The maximum allowable load of acidity is 19.3 pounds (8.8 kg) per day. The concentration of alkalinity in the creek is 1.34 milligrams per liter and the daily load if it is 24.1 pounds (10.9 kg). The pH of Cranberry Creek near its mouth ranges from 4.8 to 5.6, with an average of 5.08.

The discharge of Cranberry Creek near its mouth is 1502.67 gallons per minute. However, it has been known to run dry.

== Geography and geology ==
The elevation near the mouth of Cranberry Creek is 1,460 feet (450 m) above sea level. The elevation of the creek's source is between 1,740 feet (530 m) and 1,760 feet (540 m) above sea level.

A reservoir known as the Grape Run Reservoir is located on the upper reaches of Cranberry Creek. The creek also flows through the Hazleton Basin, where it loses its flow due to strip mining, despite remaining intact up to that point. The creek's channel is intact throughout most of the rest of its length, but nearly none of its water leaves the Hazleton Basin. This is similar to the uppermost reaches of Black Creek.

Cranberry Creek is one of four streams to successfully exit the Jeddo Tunnel drainage basin, the others being Little Black Creek, Black Creek, and Hazle Creek. Cranberry Creek has been described by Bloomsburg University professor Duane Braun as having "sharp, multiple crest hydrography".

Most of Cranberry Creek's water was redirected to the Jeddo Tunnel until the creek was restored by the Pennsylvania Bureau of Abandoned Mine Reclamation and moved to its original location. Since the restoration of the creek, a series of drainage ditches and culverts have carried water from Pennsylvania Department of Transportation structures on Interstate 81 and Pennsylvania Route 924 to the creek.

== Watershed ==
The watershed of Cranberry Creek is in the south-central portion of the Nescopeck Creek watershed. It is adjacent to the watersheds of Stony Creek and Black Creek. The watershed of Cranberry Creek has an area of approximately 8 square miles (21 km^{2}).

There are approximately 40 miles (64 km) of local roads in the watershed of Cranberry Creek and slightly less than 20 miles (32 km) of state roads. Major roads in the watershed include Pennsylvania Route 924, Pennsylvania Route 309, and Interstate 81. 6.5 percent of the watershed's area is barren land. Coal mining lands are prevalent within the watershed.

Cranberry Creek is entirely in the United States Geological Survey quadrangles of Conyngham and Hazleton. The creek's mouth is in the former quadrangle and its source is in the latter quadrangle. The creek is near the community of a mining village known as Cranberry. It is also in the vicinity of the city of Hazleton. The creek historically drained the Harwood and Cranberry districts.

== History ==
Cranberry Creek was added to the Geographic Names Information System on August 2, 1979. Its identifier in the Geographic Names Information System is 1172617.

Cranberry Creek was rendered acidic by sulfur-containing mine drainage as early as the early 1900s. The sulfur pollution came from the Cranberry Mines. The creek was also polluted by "strippings" from Hazleton. The creek was unsuitable as a water supply at the time for that reason. A sewer system also historically discharged into the creek.

Historically, coal mining, including strip mining, was done in the watershed of Cranberry Creek. The Pennsylvania Department of Environmental Protection Bureau of Abandoned Mine Reclamation has plans to restore the creek's flow along its entire length. The Jeddo Highland Coal Company has an operation known as the Cranberry Colliery Bank in the vicinity of the creek. This operation's purpose is reprocessing refuse. A 366-acre tract of land near the creek was used for coal mining by the Hazleton Coal Company and the Lehigh Valley Coal Company until 1947. Pennsylvania Route 924 was constructed through this tract of land in 1965. The Community Area New Development Organization purchased the area in 2006 and plans to construct a recreational area called the Cranberry Creek Gateway Park there.

During the restoration of Cranberry Creek, nearly 7,000 feet (2,100 m) of the creek was relocated. The restoration also reclaimed 135 acres of strip mining land.

A concrete culvert bridge was constructed over Cranberry Creek in 1967. It is 37.1 feet (11.3 m) long and carries Pennsylvania Route 924.

== Biology ==
Cranberry Creek is designated as a Coldwater Fishery.

== See also ==
- Wolffs Run, next tributary of Stony Creek going upstream
