= Scotch Creek =

Scotch Creek may refer to:

- Scotch Creek, British Columbia, a community on Shuswap Lake
- Scotch Creek (British Columbia), a creek in the Thompson River drainage
