= Death march (disambiguation) =

A death march is a forced march of prisoners.

- Death marches during the Holocaust, death marches of concentration camp prisoners in 1944 and 1945

Death march may also refer to:

- Death march (project management), a project that involves grueling overwork and (often) patently unrealistic expectations, and thus (in many cases) is destined to fail
- Long periods of crunch in the games industry can also be referred to as a death march.

== Media (books and visual) ==
- Death March (film), a 2013 film
- Death March to the Parallel World Rhapsody, a Japanese novel (2013 ongoing), light novel, manga, and anime (2018) series

== Music ==
- Popular name of the funeral march movement of Piano Sonata No. 2
- "Dead March", part of oratorio by Saul
- Deathmarch (EP) by Swedish black metal band Marduk
- "Deathmarch", Plague Angel by Marduk
- "Deathmarch", from Liberation by 1349
- Deathmarch EP, by The Grand Astoria
- "Death March", from Reincarnate by Motionless in White

== Other uses ==
- Dodentocht, 100 km walking tour in Belgium

== See also ==
- Funeral march
