= Long Run, Louisville =

Neighborhood in Louisville, Kentucky

Coordinates: 38°13′50″N 85°26′19″W

Long Run is a neighborhood of Louisville, Kentucky located near Shelbyville Road (US 60) and Clark Station Road.
