= Long Play (disambiguation) =

Long Play, or LP, is a vinyl record format.

Long Play or Longplay or Long Player may also refer to:

== Music ==
- Long Play Album, by Stars on 45, 1981
  - Longplay Album – Volume II, 1981
- The Long Play, by Sandra, 1985
- Longplay (album), by Plavi orkestar, 1998
- Long Plays 83–87, compilation album by Pseudo Echo
- Long Player (album), by Faces, 1971
- Longplayer, a composition by Jem Finer expected to last 1,000 years

== Other uses ==
- Long play (VCR format)
- Longplay (video games), a complete and detailed play-through of a video game

== See also ==
- LP (disambiguation)
- Extended play (disambiguation)
