= Buck Mountain (Pennsylvania) =

Mountain in the US state of Pennsylvania

Coordinates: 40°57′03″N 76°12′27″W

- Bucks Mountain
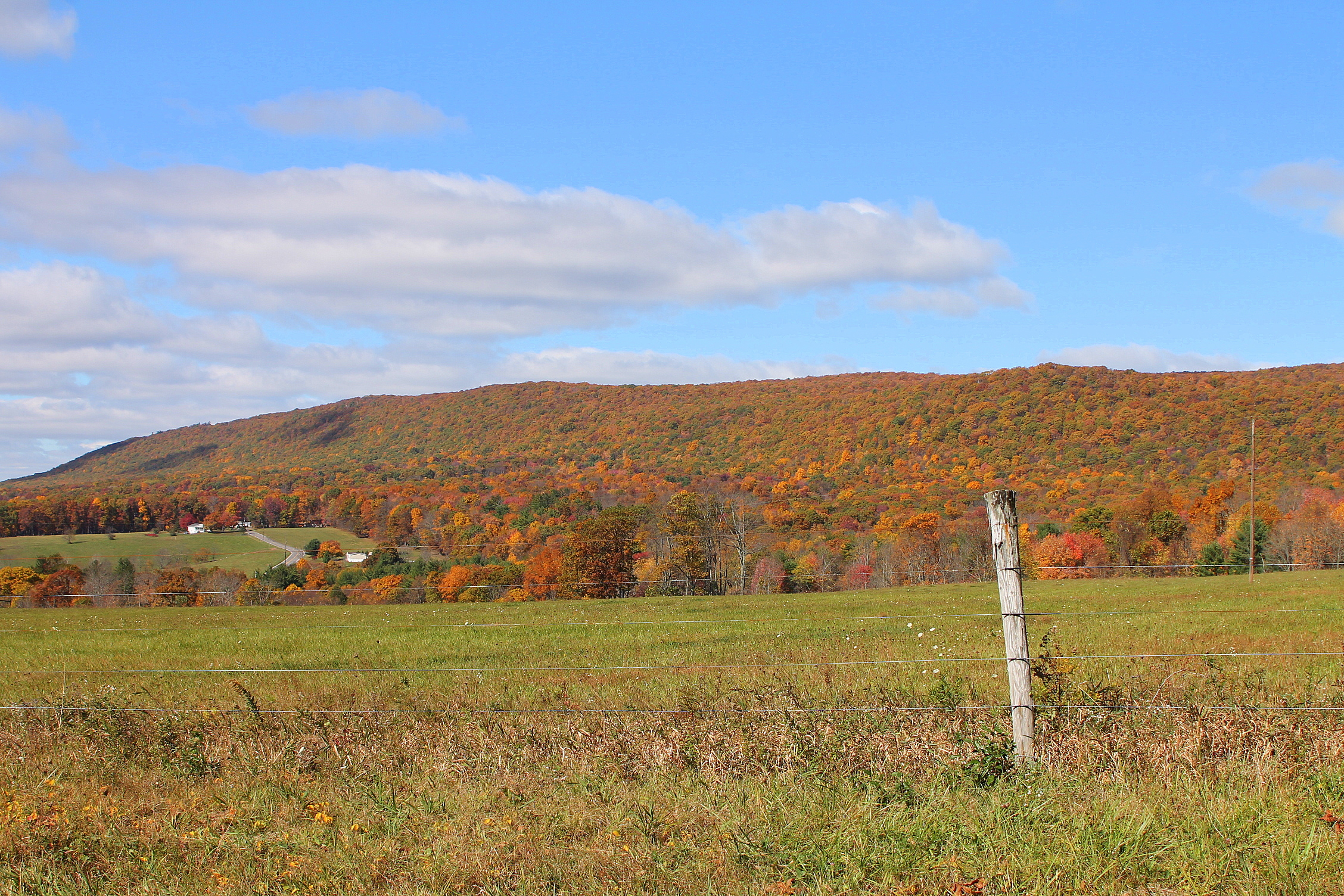
- Buck Mountain as seen from Buck Mountain Road

Highest point
- Elevation: 1,942 ft (592 m)

Geography
- Topo map: Nuremberg (for official coordinates)

Buck Mountain (also known as Bucks Mountain) is a mountain in Columbia County and Luzerne County, Pennsylvania, in the United States. Its elevation is 1,942 feet (592 m) above sea level. The mountain contains deposits of coal (specifically anthracite). Shale and conglomerate are also present. The coal on the mountain was historically mined, altering the landscape somewhat. The mountain is believed to be named after Albert Ansbach, the owner of a nearby colliery.

== Geography ==
Buck Mountain has an official elevation of 1,942 feet (592 m), making it the fourth-highest mountain in Columbia County.

Buck Mountain's official coordinates are in the United States Geological Survey quadrangle of Nuremberg. The mountain is located in southeastern Beaver Township, Columbia County.

A stream known as Beaver Run flows between Buck Mountain and McCauley Mountain. Buck Mountain is on the border of the Beaver Valley, some distance north of the community of Shumans. Additionally, Falls Run, a tributary of Black Creek flows through Columbia County and Luzerne County, between the mountain and a hill known as Middle Hill. The mountain has a spur.

== Geology ==
Buck Mountain contains deposits of coal. Part of the landscape on Buck Mountain has been altered by mining in the past.

There are beds of red shale on Buck Mountain. This shale underlies rock formations of conglomerate. It also underlies beds of anthracite on the mountain.

== History and etymology ==
A prominent hotel owned by Adam Michael historically operated at the base of Buck Mountain for a long period of time. The hotel was opened in the early 1800s. The Reading Railroad historically had a tunnel that passed through a spur of Buck Mountain.

Coal mining has been done on Buck Mountain. Historically, it was done by the Buck Mountain Coal Company, but later, the mining was instead done by Coxe Brothers & Co. In the early 1900s, the mines were operated by the Lehigh Valley Coal Company. In the early 1900s, the coal was sent to the community of Gowen. There, it was loaded onto railroad cars and sent to Hazleton, where it was put on the market.

There are plans by several counties to construct a wind farm on Buck Mountain.

Buck Mountain was added to the Geographic Names Information System on August 2, 1979. Its identifier in the Geographic Names Information System is 1170524.

Buck Mountain is most likely named after Albert Ansbach, who was nicknamed "Buck". Ansbach was the owner of a nearby colliery. The name was bestowed upon the mountain in 1869 or 1870.

== Biology ==
Numerous species use Buck Mountain as a habitat. However, the Columbia County Natural Areas Inventory states that surveys of the mountain have not been done.

== See also ==
- McCauley Mountain (Pennsylvania), nearby mountain
- Catawissa Mountain, nearby mountain
