= Long Run, Ohio =

Ghost town in Ohio, United States

Coordinates: 40.207°N 82.285°W

Long Run is a ghost town in Licking County, in the U.S. state of Ohio.

== History ==
Long Run once contained a mill. A post office was established at Long Run in 1858, and remained in operation until 1904.
