= Cranberry Creek (Yellow River tributary) =

Stream in Wisconsin, U.S.

Coordinates: 44°07′56″N 90°05′57″W

Cranberry Creek is a stream in the U.S. state of Wisconsin. It is a tributary to the Yellow River.

Cranberry Creek was so named for the wild cranberries along its course.
