= Long Walk to Freedom (disambiguation) =

Long Walk to Freedom is an autobiographical work written by Nelson Mandela.

Long Walk to Freedom may also refer to:

- Long Walk to Freedom (album), a 2006 album by Ladysmith Black Mambazo
- Mandela: Long Walk to Freedom, a 2013 biographical film about Nelson Mandela
- The Long March to Freedom, The National Heritage Monument is a group of copper statues representing anti-apartheid activists, Zulu chiefs and missionaries
