= Sindh Peasants Long March =

Peasants campaign in Pakistan

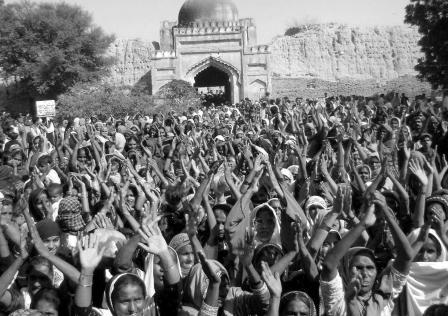
Hyderabad: Women chanting slogans at the beginning of Sindh Peasants Long March

Sindh Peasants Long March for Land Reforms (15–26 February 2009), was a mass long walk of 350 kilometres by over 30,000 peasants and rural worker women and men carried for over 12 days form Hyderabad to Sindh Assembly building Karachi, Sindh. The march was organised to seek amendments in the Sindh Tenancy Act that was also legislated after thousands of peasants gathering in front of Sindh Assembly building Karachi in 1950 led by late Comrade Hyder Bux Jatoi, a stalwart peasants leader of Pakistan.

== Organisers and leadership ==
The long march was organised and led by the prominent peasant's rights and civil society activist Zulfiqar Shah, who then was Coordinator of South Asia Partnership Pakistan, a nationwide civil society organisation and Sindh Agrarian Reforms Action Committee, a coalition of peasant bodies and organisations.

== Marchers cross the villages and towns ==
The march was begun from the mausoleum of Comrade Hyder Bux Jatoi at the historical tomb of 18th century popular King of Sindh, Ghulam Shah Kalhoro where beyond 15000 peasants gathered and started marching through the various streets of Hyderabad city continuously for 7 hours. After marching past Hyderabad city, hundreds of the marchers passed through various prominent cities, towns and villages of Sindh including Tando Mohammad Khan. Kapoor Mori, Village Abdul Raheem Kateyar, Shah Abdul Kareem Bulri, Mir Pure Bathoro, Jhok Sharif, Churetani, Sajawal, Saeedpur, Branch Mori, Makli, Gujjo, Gharo, Dhabeji, Ghaghar, Gulshan e hadeed, Yousif Goth, malir Temple, Karsaz and Nashtar Park. During the march, popular Sufi and classic singers of the province joined the marchers in the evenings and contributed their art volunteer. Those included Shafi Faqeer's Rag Mahfil at Sufi Shaheed Shah Inayats mausoleum at Jhok Sharif. In 17th century, Sufi Shah inayat waged a war with Mughul rulers of India for the peasants rights over the land and was killed near Jhok Sharif. Prominent classical Raga singer Haneef Lashari stayed the whole night singing with the marchers in Gulshan-e-Hadeed near Karachi.

== Peasants rights and issues in Pakistan ==
Agriculture is the most important sector of Pakistan's economy. Agricultural growth has been the key element associated with economic development of Pakistan, despite the fact that the share of agriculture in GDP has fallen from 53% in 1947 to 21% in 2006–07. The share of Sindh province in Pakistan's agriculture value added accounts roughly for 25 percent. Sindh is typically rich in rangeland resources (about 55% of its land surface). The share of agriculture in Sindh GDP, which was 30% in 1999–2000, is estimated to have drastically declined to about 20% during the last five years due to a variety of physical, sociological and institutional framework factors. One of the main institutional constraints in Sindh is the highly skewed land ownership pattern and defunct tenancy system.

In Sindh, more than one third of the land is tenanted and about two-thirds of land is under sharecropping, a form of farming where output is shared between the landowner and tenant. Sharecropping is the predominant form of tenancy in Sindh where the land ownership distribution is particularly skewed.

After independence in 1947, there have been four formal institutional reforms in land ownership and tenancy system prevailing in Sindh – Sindh Tenancy Act (STA) 1950, Land Reforms 1959; Land Reforms 1972 and Agrarian Reforms 1977.

Peasant rights in the context of landlord – peasant relationship had been protected through formulation of the Sindh Tenancy Act [STA] in 1950 after the rigorous struggle of the peasants of Sindh.

With the passage of time the socio – economic trends and conditions have been changed and the productive relations and agriculture patterns have transformed due to urbanisation, use of technology and globalisation. The existing STA has become irrelevant and does not fulfill the right and needs of the peasants and address the contemporary socio-economic situation in rural society of Sindh.

In this regard, after a consultative process by civil society organisations with the peasants of different crop pattern area, peasant activists and legal experts a draft of amendments in STA have been developed. Since last a couple of years the peasants of Sindh with the support of their representative organisations and civil society actors have been struggling for the amendments in the STA.

== Long march demands ==
The long march was carried to amend the following sections of Sindh Tenancy Act 1950:

Section 2 (2), Section 4 (1), Section 4 (II -a), Section 4 (II-b), Section 5 (2-a), Section 5 (3-a), Section 9, Section 10 (1), Section 12 (1), Section 12 (2), Section 13 (e), Section 13 (f), Section 13 (g), Section 13 (i), Section 14 (1), Section 14 (5), Section 22 (I), Section 25, Section 28 (1-b), Section 32, Section 34 (1), Section 34 (2), Section 25 (1-d)

The major demands were to establish peasants' courts, re-defining peasantry, eviction of peasants from the land, share in the crops and agriculture inputs and a wide range of issues relating peasantry in Sindh.

== Commitments by Sindh government ==
As soon as long March reached Sindh Assembly builds, Deputy Speaker Sindh Assembly, Ms. Shehla Reza along with couple of minister and a large number of MPs including Ms. Farheen Mughul, and Mr. Anwar Mahar. They welcomed the long march, presented flowers to the long march leadership. A committee for the talks over the issue consisting Zulfiqar Shah, Mohammad Tahseen, ex Senator Iqbal Hyder, Fatima Siyal, Shehnaz Shidi, Punhal Sariyo, Ramzan Memon and Karamat Ali held a brief meeting with the representatives of Sindh government, who made commitments for the amendments mentioned in the draft presented to them. On the occasion, Deputy Speaker Sindh Assembly Ms. Shehla Reza spoke to the marchers and made a public commitment for the amendments by the coalition government of Pakistan People's Party in Sindh. Later on, a bill was presented for the review and amendments in Sindh Assembly but could not get approval of the house as majority of the MPs were feudal lords themselves.

== Participants of the march ==
Apart from thousands of men and women peasants and organizers, a large number of civil society and political leaders took part in the march that includes Mohammad Tahseen of SAP PK, Iqbal Hyder of HRCP, Bashir Qureshi of JSQM, Dr, Sadar Sarki of JSQM, Hassan Nasir of Awami Party, Pakistan, Mustafa Baloch of SPO, Karamat Ali and Ali Ercelan of PILER, Mohammad Ali Shah of Pakistan Fisherfolk Forum, Suleman G. Abro of SAFWCO, Shaheena Ramzan of Bhandar Harri Sangat, Ghaffar Malik of SDS, Punhal Sariyo of SHPC, Adam Malik of Actionaid and many others.
