= Long Run, West Virginia =

- Unincorporated community
- Location within the state of West Virginia Long Run (the United States)
- Coordinates: 39°16′13″N 80°39′9″W
- Country: United States
- State: West Virginia
- County: Doddridge
- Elevation: 853 ft (260 m)
- Time zone: UTC-5 (Eastern (EST))
  - Summer (DST): UTC-4 (EDT)
- GNIS ID: 1554992

Long Run is an unincorporated community in Doddridge County, West Virginia, United States. Its post office is closed.

The community takes its name from nearby Long Run Creek.
