= Long Run (Elk Run tributary) =

Physical characteristics
- Source
  - location: top of a deep valley in Davidson Township, Sullivan County, Pennsylvania
  - elevation: between 2,360 and 2,380 feet (720 and 730 m)
- Mouth
  - location: Elk Run in Davidson Township, Sullivan County, Pennsylvania
  - coordinates: 41°18′37″N 76°24′37″W
  - elevation: 1,217 ft (371 m)
- Length: 2.4 mi (3.9 km)
- Basin size: 1.92 sq mi (5.0 km^{2})

Basin features
- Progression: Elk Run → West Branch Fishing Creek → Fishing Creek → Susquehanna River → Chesapeake Bay
- Tributaries
  - left: four unnamed tributaries

Long Run is a tributary of Elk Run in Sullivan County, Pennsylvania, in the United States. It is approximately 2.4 miles (3.9 km) long and flows through Davidson Township. The stream's watershed has an area of 1.92 square miles (5.0 km^{2}). It has no named tributaries, but four unnamed tributaries. The stream is considered by the Pennsylvania Department of Environmental Protection to be impaired by atmospheric deposition and metals. Wisconsinan Bouldery Till, Wisconsinan Till, and bedrock consisting of sandstone and shale occur in the vicinity of it.

== Course ==
Long Run begins at the top of a deep valley in Davidson Township. It flows south for several tenths of a mile, receiving two unnamed tributaries from the left. The stream then turns south-southwest and its valley becomes considerably deeper. It then turns south for more than a mile, receiving two more unnamed tributaries from the left. The stream then turns southwest, exits its valley, and reaches its confluence with Elk Run near the border between Sullivan County and Columbia County.

Long Run joins Elk Run 0.42 miles (0.68 km) upstream of its mouth.

== Hydrology ==
Long Run is considered to be impaired by atmospheric deposition and metals. A total of 4.25 miles (6.84 km) of the stream and its unnamed tributaries have this impairment. This is approximately 10.5 percent of all the impaired streams in the watersheds of West Branch Fishing Creek and East Branch Fishing Creek.

Long Run does not attain the stream standards of the Pennsylvania Department of Environmental Protection. None of its four unnamed tributaries attain the standards either.

== Geography and geology ==
The elevation near the mouth of Long Run is 1,217 feet (371 m) above sea level. The elevation of the stream's source is between 2,360 and 2,380 feet (720 and 730 m) above sea level.

Most of the valley of Long Run is on a glacial or resedimented till known as the Wisconsinan Bouldery Till. This till contains numerous boulders consisting of sandstone, quartz, and conglomerate. The rest of the stream's valley, as well as the slopes of the valley, are on bedrock consisting of shale and sandstone. A till known as the Wisconsinan Till occurs near the headwaters of the stream.

== Watershed ==
The watershed of Long Run has an area of 1.92 square miles (5.0 km^{2}). The stream is entirely within the United States Geological Survey quadrangle of Elk Grove.

Long Run is one of twenty streams in the Upper Susquehanna-Lackawanna drainage basin whose streambed is publicly owned. The streambeds of the two other named tributaries of Elk Run (Hog Run and Gallows Run) are also publicly owned, as is the streambed of Elk Run itself.

== History ==
Long Run was entered into the Geographic Names Information System on August 2, 1979. Its identifier in the Geographic Names Information System is 1179887.

== See also ==
- Hog Run, next tributary of Elk Run going upstream
- List of tributaries of Fishing Creek (North Branch Susquehanna River)
