= Cranberry Creek (Blanchard River tributary) =

Stream in Ohio, U.S.

Coordinates: 41°2′54″N 84°6′22″W

Cranberry Creek is a stream in the U.S. state of Ohio. This 19.4-mile (31.2 km) long stream is a tributary of the Blanchard River.

Cranberry Creek was named for the cranberries which once grew along its course.

== See also ==
- List of rivers of Ohio
