= The Long Run =

The Long Run may refer to:

- The Long Run (album), a 1979 album by the Eagles
- "The Long Run" (song), a 1979 song by the Eagles from the album
- The Long Run (film), a 2000 film starring Armin Mueller-Stahl and Nthati Moshesh
- The Long Run, a book by firefighter Matthew Long

== See also ==
- Long-run
- Long Run (disambiguation)
- Long March (disambiguation)
- Long Walk (disambiguation)
