= Rock Glen, Pennsylvania =

Unincorporated community in Pennsylvania, US

- Unincorporated community
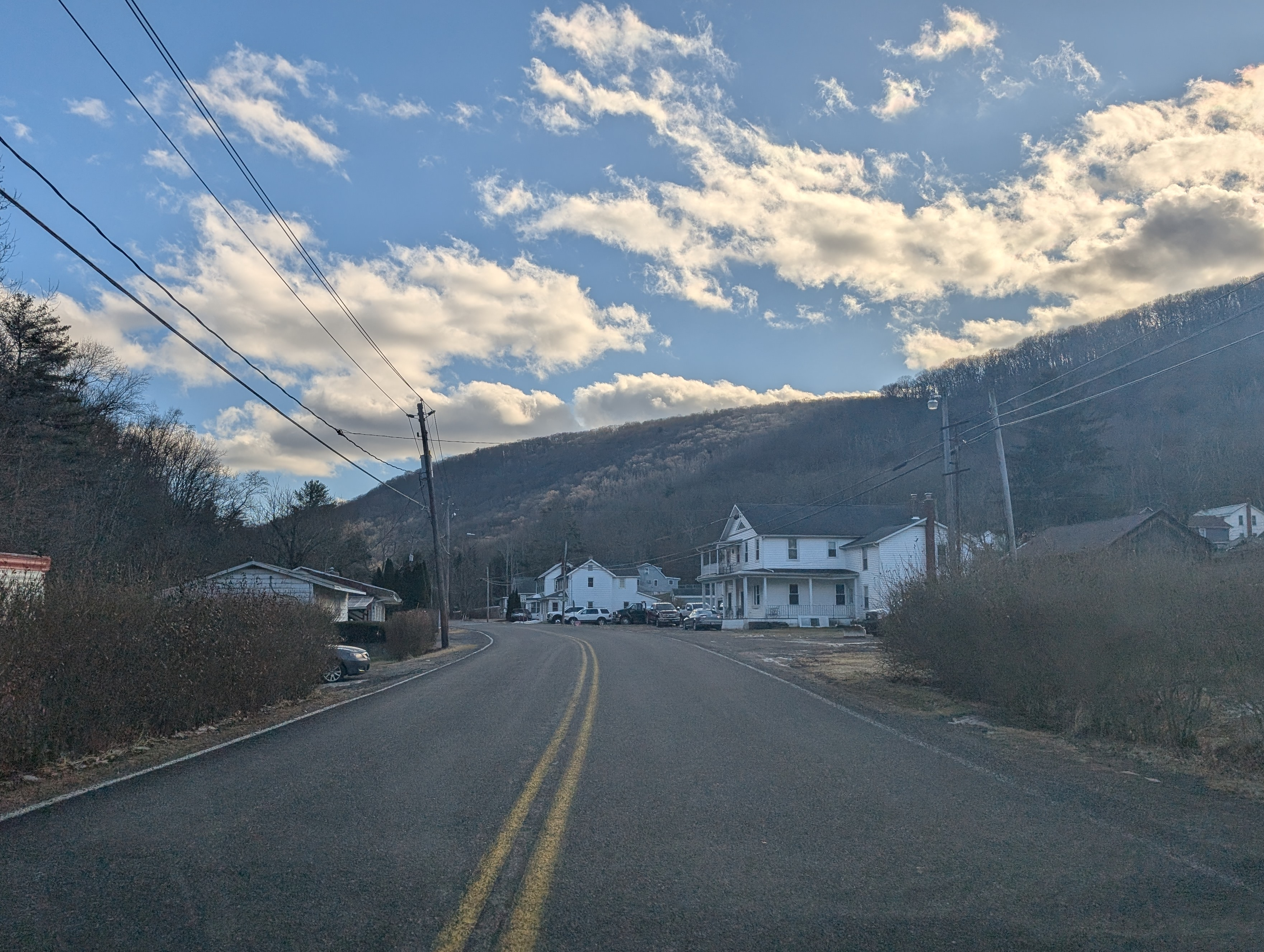
- Tomhicken Road eastbound through Rock Glen

- Location within Pennsylvania Location within the United States
- Coordinates: 40°57′55″N 76°11′04″W
- Country: United States
- State: Pennsylvania
- County: Luzerne
- Township: Black Creek
- Elevation: 873 ft (266 m)
- Time zone: UTC-5 (Eastern (EST))
  - Summer (DST): UTC-4 (EDT)
- ZIP code: 18246
- Area codes: 570 and 272
- GNIS feature ID: 1185252

Rock Glen is an unincorporated community located in Black Creek Township in Luzerne County, Pennsylvania. Rock Glen is located along Tomhicken Road and the Black Creek, west of Hazleton and south of Nescopeck.
