= The Longest Ride =

The Longest Ride may refer to:

- The Longest Ride (film), a 2015 American Neo Western romantic drama film based on Spark's novel of the same name
- The Longest Ride (novel), a 2013 novel by Nicholas Sparks
