= Long Trail (disambiguation) =

The Long Trail is a hiking trail in Vermont.

Long Trail can also refer to:

- Long Trail State Forest, a park around the Long Trail in Vermont

== Organizations ==
- Long Trail Brewing Company, a brewery in Bridgewater Corners, Vermont
- Long Trail School, a college-preparatory school in Dorset, Vermont
- Long Trail District, a boy scout district in Vermont

== Films ==
- The Long Trail (film), a 1917 silent film
- The Long Long Trail, a 1929 Western film

== See also ==
- Long-distance trail
