= Long Walk to Forever =

Long Walk to Forever may refer to:

- Long Walk to Forever (EP), the debut EP for post hardcore band Pencey Prep.
- Long Walk to Forever (film), a 1987 dramatic short, starring Denis Leary
- Long Walk to Forever (short story), a 1960 short story by Kurt Vonnegut, see Kurt Vonnegut bibliography
