= Stony Creek (Black Creek tributary) =

River in Pennsylvania, U.S.

- Location of Stony Creek mouth Stony Creek (Black Creek tributary) (the United States)

Physical characteristics
- Source
  - location: confluence of Wolffs Run and an unnamed stream near State Route 3024 in Hazle Township, Luzerne County, Pennsylvania
  - elevation: between 1,700 and 1,720 feet (520 and 520 m)
- Mouth
  - location: Black Creek in West Hazleton, Luzerne County, Pennsylvania
  - coordinates: 40°58′16″N 76°01′38″W
  - elevation: 1,450 ft (440 m)
- Length: 3.7 mi (6.0 km)
- Discharge
  - average: 5,898.83 US gallons per minute (0.372158 m^{3}/s) below Cranberry Creek

Basin features
- Progression: Black Creek → Nescopeck Creek → Susquehanna River → Chesapeake Bay
- Tributaries
  - left: Wolffs Run
  - right: Cranberry Creek

Stony Creek is a tributary of Black Creek in Luzerne County, Pennsylvania, in the United States. It is approximately 3.7 miles (6.0 km) long and flows through Hazle Township and West Hazleton. Its named tributaries include Cranberry Creek and Wolffs Run. Stony Creek is considered to be impaired by acid mine drainage and also has measurable concentrations of iron, aluminum, and manganese. The Llwellyn Formation and the Mauch Chunk Formation can be found near the creek. Land uses in its watershed include forested land and barren land. A reservoir has been constructed in the watershed and at least one bridge has been built over the creek. The creek is considered to be a coldwater fishery and a migratory fishery.

== Course ==
Stony Creek begins at the confluence of Wolffs Run and an unnamed stream near State Route 3024 in Hazle Township. It flows north for nearly a mile, receiving an unnamed tributary and entering a valley. The creek then turns east-northeast for a few miles, remaining in its valley. Eventually it crosses Interstate 81 and receives the tributary Cranberry Creek. At this point, Stony Creek turns north and enters West Hazleton after a short distance. A short distance further downstream, it reaches its confluence with Black Creek.

=== Tributaries ===
Stony Creek has two named tributaries: Cranberry Creek and Wolffs Run.

== Hydrology ==
The pH of the waters of Stony Creek is 5.3 and the total concentration of alkalinity is 2 milligrams per liter. The concentration of water hardness in the creek is over 100 milligrams per liter, which is nearly four times more than the concentration of water hardness in any other major headwater tributary of Nescopeck Creek. The specific conductance is 27 micro-siemens.

Stony Creek and its tributary Cranberry Creek are considered by the Pennsylvania Department of Environmental Protection to be impaired by metals and pH due to acid mine drainage from abandoned coal mines. The creek is one of six streams in the watershed of Nescopeck Creek to be impaired by acid mine drainage. Stony Creek also contributes acid mine drainage to Black Creek.

Upstream of Interstate 81, the discharge of Stony Creek is 3209.50 gallons per minute. Downstream of Cranberry Creek, the discharge increases to 5898.83 gallons per minute.

There are detectable concentrations of metals on Stony Creek upstream of Interstate 81, but not enough to violate water quality standards. However, there is a total maximum daily load for acidity. The concentrations of aluminum, iron, and manganese there are 0.23, 0.16, and 0.05 milligrams per liter, respectively. The daily loads are 8.9 pounds (4.0 kg), 6.3 pounds (2.9 kg), and 2.0 pounds (0.91 kg) respectively. The concentration of acidity is 7.03 milligrams per liter and the concentration of alkalinity is 0.40 milligrams per liter. The load of acidity is 271.1 pounds (123.0 kg) per day (the maximum allowable load is 12.8 pounds (5.8 kg) per day) and the alkalinity load is 15.2 pounds (6.9 kg) per day. Sulfate concentrations range from 7.3 to 8.4 milligrams per liter.

There are detectable concentrations of metals on Stony Creek upstream of Interstate 81, but not enough to violate water quality standards. However, there is a total maximum daily load for acidity. The concentrations of aluminum, iron, and manganese there are 0.32, 0.23, and 0.08 milligrams per liter, respectively. The daily loads are 22.6 pounds (10.3 kg), 16.1 pounds (7.3 kg), and 5.7 pounds (2.6 kg) respectively. The concentration of acidity is 7.05 milligrams per liter and the concentration of alkalinity is 0.24 milligrams per liter. The load of acidity is 499.3 pounds (226.5 kg) per day (the maximum allowable load is 13.4 pounds (6.1 kg) per day) and the alkalinity load is 17.1 pounds (7.8 kg) per day. Sulfate concentrations range from 7.9 to 10.1 milligrams per liter.

== Geography and geology ==
The elevation near the mouth of Stony Creek is 1,450 feet (440 m) above sea level. The elevation of the creek's source is between 1,700 and 1,720 feet (520 and 520 m) above sea level.

The Hazleton-Dekalb-Buchanan soil series can be found in the watershed of Stony Creek. This soil is also found in several other nearby portions of the Nescopeck Creek watershed, such as the watershed of Black Creek, Hazleton, and West Hazleton. Rock formations in the watershed of Stony Creek include the Llwellyn Formation and the Mauch Chunk Formation. The latter rock formation is the most prevalent one in the watershed of Nescopeck Creek.

A mine pool basin known as the Stony Creek Basin drains to the Stony Creek Mine Seepage and the Stony Creek Mine Pool Overflow. This mine pool basin affects Stony Creek. This discharge has a flow of 0.3 cubic feet per second at the surface and 4.0 cubic feet per second underground.

== Watershed ==
The watershed of Stony Creek is in the south-central part of the Nescopeck Creek watershed.

There are several miles of local roads and considerably fewer miles of state roads in the watershed of Stony Creek. More than 50 percent of the Nescopeck Creek watershed is on forested land. However, 30 percent of the watershed of Stony Creek is barren land. Urban land and strip mines occupy a significant portion of the watershed's land. The watershed is one of several sub-watersheds in the Nescopeck Creek drainage basin where coal mining land is prevalent, the others being Black Creek and Cranberry Creek.

Stony Creek is entirely within the United States Geological Survey quadrangle of Conyngham.

A reservoir known as the Humboldt Reservoir is in the watershed of Stony Creek. The reservoir provides 20 percent of Hazleton's water supply.

== History ==
Stony Creek was entered into the Geographic Names Information System on August 2, 1979. Its identifier in the Geographic Names Information System is 1188763.

A concrete culvert bridge carrying Interstate 81 over Stony Creek was constructed in 1967. The bridge is 81.8 feet (24.9 m) long.

The Pennsylvania Fish and Boat Commission has a water quality sampling station on Stony Creek.

== Biology ==
Stony Creek is considered to be a Coldwater Fishery, as is its tributary Cranberry Creek. Stony Creek is also designated as a Migratory Fishery.

== See also ==
- Falls Run, next tributary of Black Creek going downstream
- Gravel Run (Black Creek), next tributary of Black Creek going upstream
- List of rivers of Pennsylvania
