= Long Road =

Long Road or The Long Road may refer to:

== Film and television ==
- The Long Road (film), a 1911 film by D. W. Griffith
- "The Long Road" (Crusade), a television episode

== Music ==
- The Long Road, a 2003 album by Nickelback
- The Long Road, a 2017 album by Rhydian Roberts
- Long Road, a 1991 album by Junior Reid
- Long Road, a 1997 album by Quatermass II
- "The Long Road", an instrumental by Mark Knopfler from Music from 'Cal', 1984
- "The Long Road", a song by Passenger from Young as the Morning, Old as the Sea, 2016
- "Long Road", a song by Pearl Jam from Merkin Ball, 1995
- "Long Road", a song by W-inds, 2003

== Other uses ==
- Long Road (Sans Arc Lakota), a Sioux warrior memorialized at the Little Bighorn Battlefield National Monument
- Long Road Sixth Form College, a school in Cambridge, England
