= Nuremberg, Pennsylvania =

Unincorporated community in Pennsylvania, US

- Census-designated place
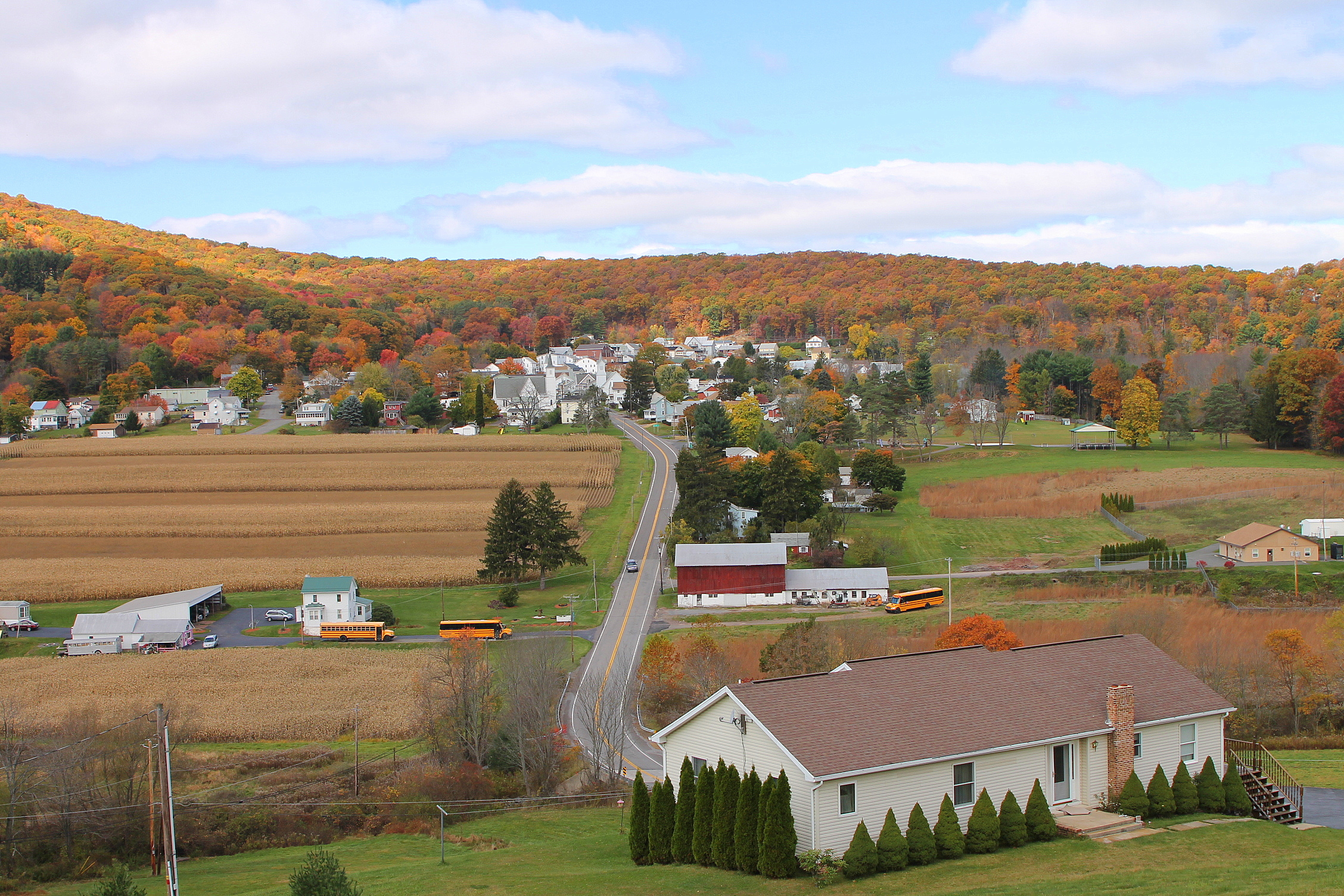
- Nuremberg from the south

- Location in Pennsylvania Location in the United States
- Coordinates: 40°56′18″N 76°10′10″W
- Country: United States
- State: Pennsylvania
- Counties: Schuylkill; Luzerne
- Townships: North Union; Black Creek

Area
  - Total: 0.60 sq mi (1.55 km^{2})
  - Land: 0.60 sq mi (1.55 km^{2})
  - Water: 0 sq mi (0.00 km^{2})

Population (2020)
  - Total: 415
  - Density: 693.1/sq mi (267.59/km^{2})
- Time zone: UTC-5 (Eastern (EST))
  - Summer (DST): UTC-4 (EDT)
- ZIP code: 18241
- Area code: 570
- FIPS code: 42-55808

Nuremberg is a census-designated place (CDP) that is located in Schuylkill and Luzerne counties, Pennsylvania, United States. Nuremberg was previously known as New London. The population was 434 at the time of the 2010 census.

== History ==
A post office has been in operation in Nuremberg since 1886. The community is served by Hazleton Area School District.

== Geography ==
Nuremberg is located at 40°56′18″N 76°10′10″W (40.938375, -76.169506).

The small farming community of Nuremberg is partially located in Black Creek Township (Luzerne County), as well as North Union Township (Schuylkill County).

According to the United States Census Bureau, the CDP has a total area of 0.58 square miles (1.5 km^{2}), all land.

== Demographics ==
Historical population
Census	Pop.	Note	%±
2020	415		—
U.S. Decennial Census

At the time of the 2000 census, there were 231 people, 103 households, and 57 families living in this CDP.

The population density was 2,207.4 inhabitants per square mile (852.3/km^{2}). There were 108 housing units at an average density of 1,032.0 per square mile (398.5/km^{2}).

The racial makeup of the CDP was 98.27% White, and 1.73% Asian.

There were 103 households, 23.3% of which had children under the age of eighteen; 41.7% were married couples living together, 12.6% had a female householder with no husband present, and 43.7% were non-families. 36.9% of households were made up of individuals, and 23.3% were one-person households with residents who were aged sixty-five or older.

The average household size was 2.24 and the average family size was 3.02.

The age distribution was 21.6% of residents who were under the age of eighteen, 8.7% who were aged eighteen to twenty-four, 26.8% who were aged twenty-five to forty-four, 27.3% who were aged forty-five to sixty-four, and 15.6% who were aged sixty-five or older. The median age was forty years.

For every one hundred females, there were 94.1 males. For every 100 females who were aged eighteen or older, there were 82.8 males.

The median income for a household in the CDP was $30,000, and the median family income was $42,500. Males had a median income of $28,333 compared with that of $23,036 for females.

The per capita income for the CDP was $15,642.

Approximately 16.0% of families and 20.7% of the population were living below the poverty line, including 51.0% of those who were under the age of eighteen. None of those who were aged sixty-five or older was living in poverty.

== Education ==
It is in the Hazleton Area School District. The zoned public high school is Hazleton Area High School in Hazle Township.

== Gallery ==
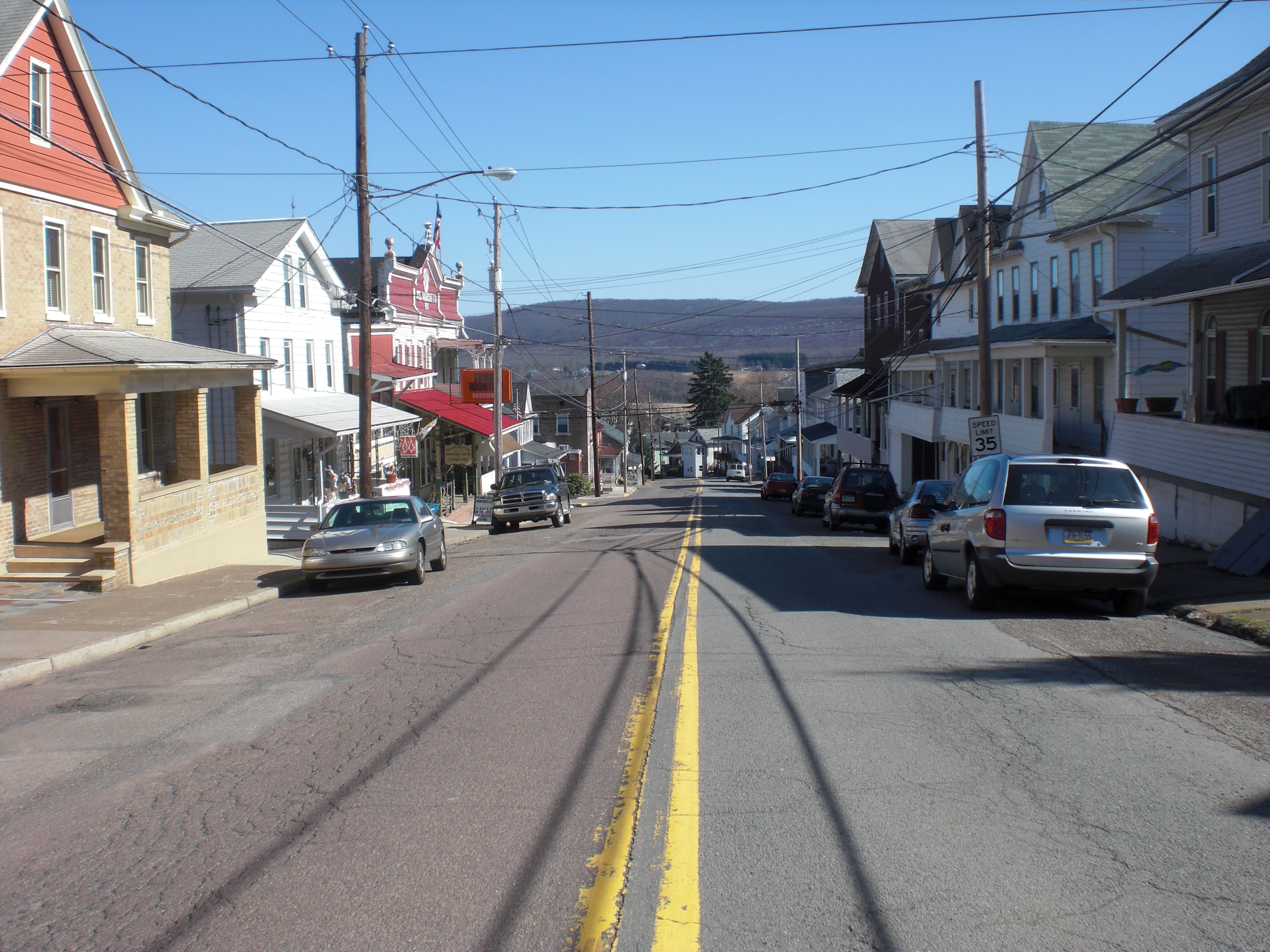
Mahanoy Street in Nuremberg
