= The Longest Journey =

The Longest Journey may refer to:

- The Longest Journey (novel), a 1907 novel by E. M. Forster
- The Longest Journey (video game), a 1999 video game by Funcom
  - Dreamfall: The Longest Journey, the game's 2006 sequel
- De Langste Reis (Dutch for 'The Longest Journey'), a 1997 film by Pieter Verhoeff
