= Black Creek Township, Pennsylvania =

Township in Pennsylvania, US

Coordinates: 41°01′00″N 76°09′59″W

- Township
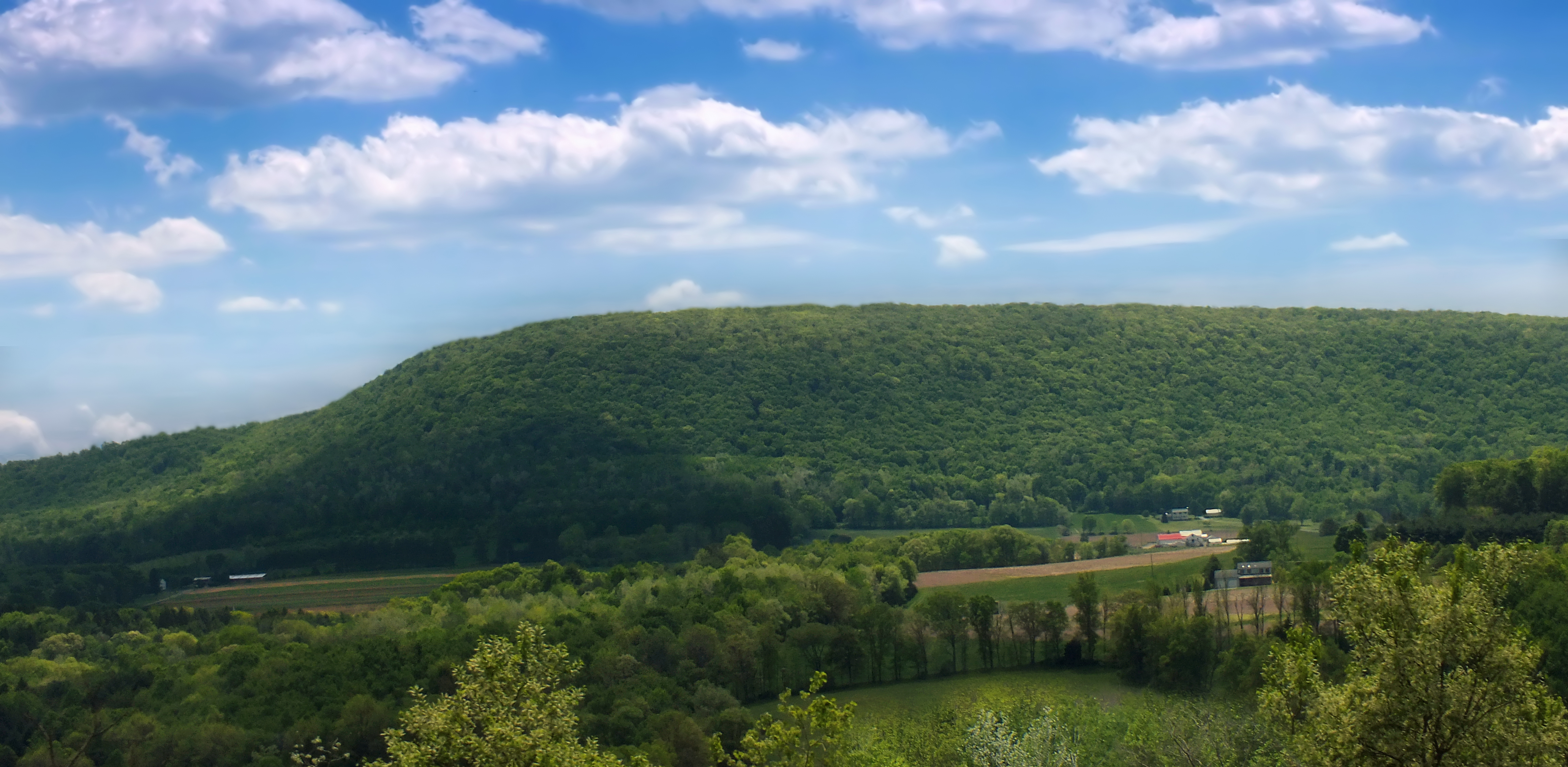
- Buck Mountain in the township

- Seal

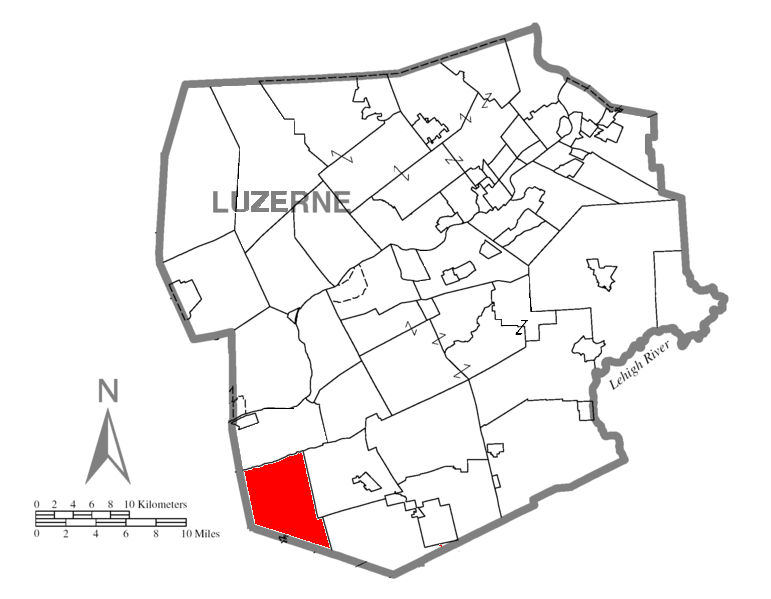
- Map of Luzerne County highlighting Black Creek Township

- Map of Pennsylvania highlighting Luzerne County
- Country: United States
- State: Pennsylvania
- County: Luzerne
- Incorporated: August 8, 1848

Area
  - Total: 24.49 sq mi (63.44 km^{2})
  - Land: 24.40 sq mi (63.19 km^{2})
  - Water: 0.097 sq mi (0.25 km^{2})

Population (2020)
  - Total: 1,904 ▼
  - Estimate (2021): 1,904
  - Density: 84.1/sq mi (32.47/km^{2})
- Time zone: UTC-5 (Eastern (EST))
  - Summer (DST): UTC-4 (EDT)
- FIPS code: 42-079-06672
- Website: blackcreektownship.org

Black Creek Township is a township in Luzerne County, Pennsylvania, United States. The population was 1,904 as of the 2020 census.

== History ==
Black Creek Township was established from a section of Sugarloaf Township on August 8, 1848. It was named after Black Creek (a stream which runs through the township).

The township grew slowly during its early years. Farmers had to clear away thick forests in order to utilize the land. The early lumbermen were also busy cutting down the forests which blanketed the mountainous landscape. The first sawmill and gristmill were built by Martin and William Rittenhouse in 1810.

== Geography ==
According to the United States Census Bureau, the township has a total area of 24.6 square miles (64 km^{2}), of which 24.5 square miles (63 km^{2}) is land and 0.1 square miles (0.26 km^{2}), or 0.45%, is water. The township is south of PA 93 (originally the Lehigh-Susquehanna Turnpike). It is also west of the Interstate 80—Interstate 81 interchange. I-80 runs through the northern portion of the township. It cuts through a mountain pass (which was formed by Nescopeck Creek).

Black Creek Township is crossed by a series of east-to-west mountains. Small farming communities are scattered throughout the many valleys which make up the township. Some of the township's villages are Mountain Grove, Rock Glen, and Weston. The small farming community of Nuremberg is partially located in Black Creek Township (Luzerne County) and North Union Township (Schuylkill County).

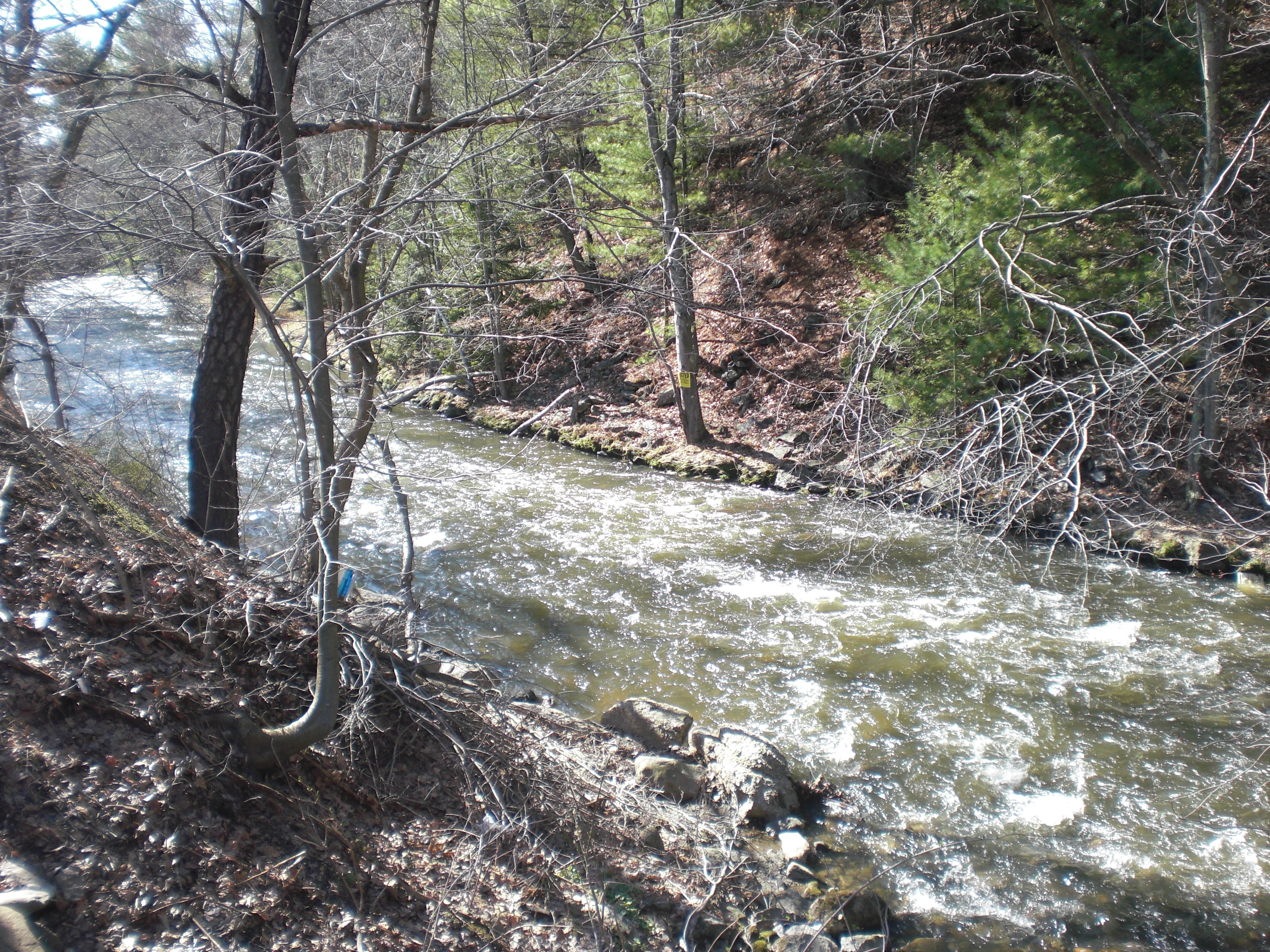
Black Creek flowing through the township

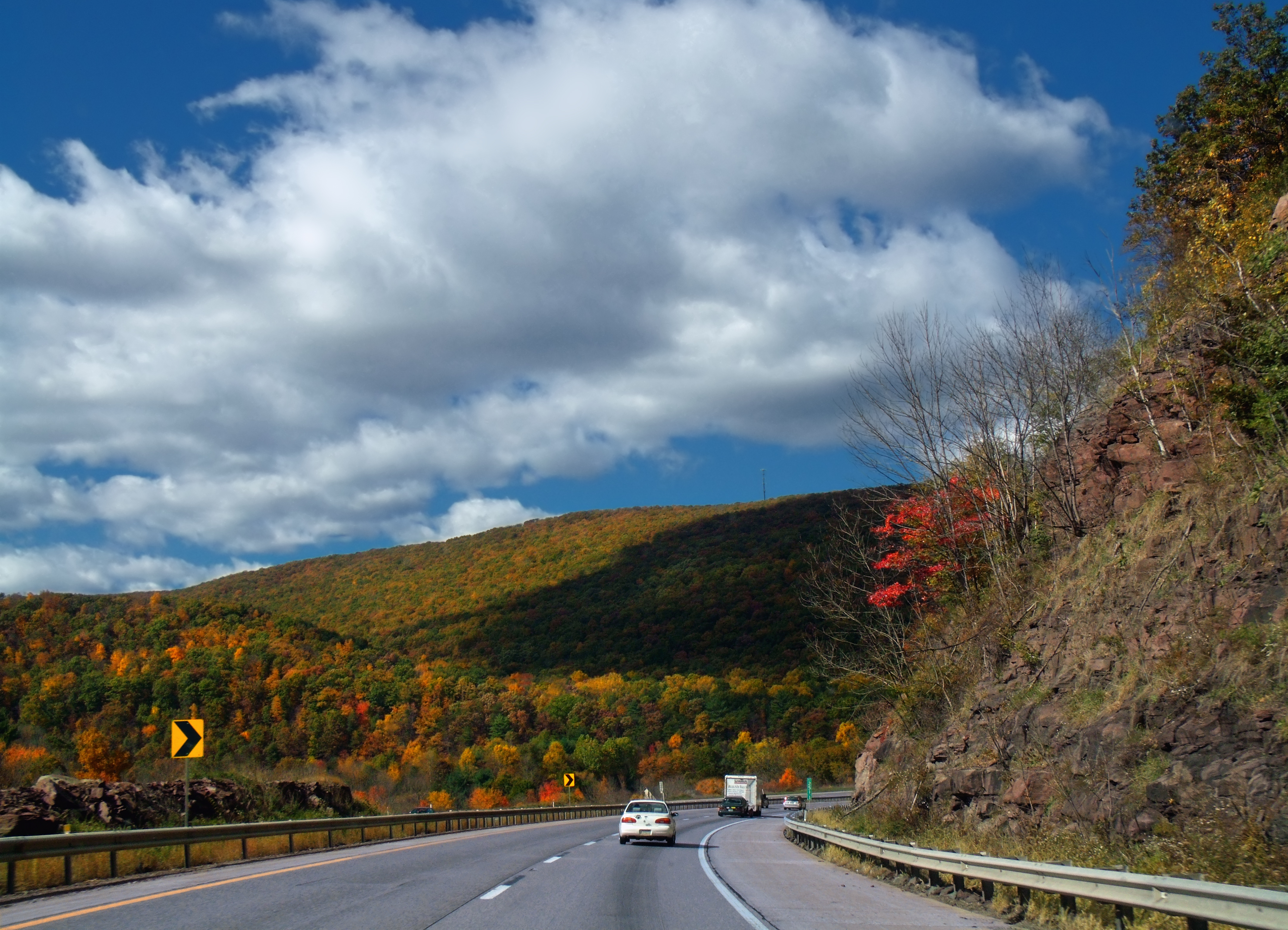
Interstate 80 in northern Black Creek Township

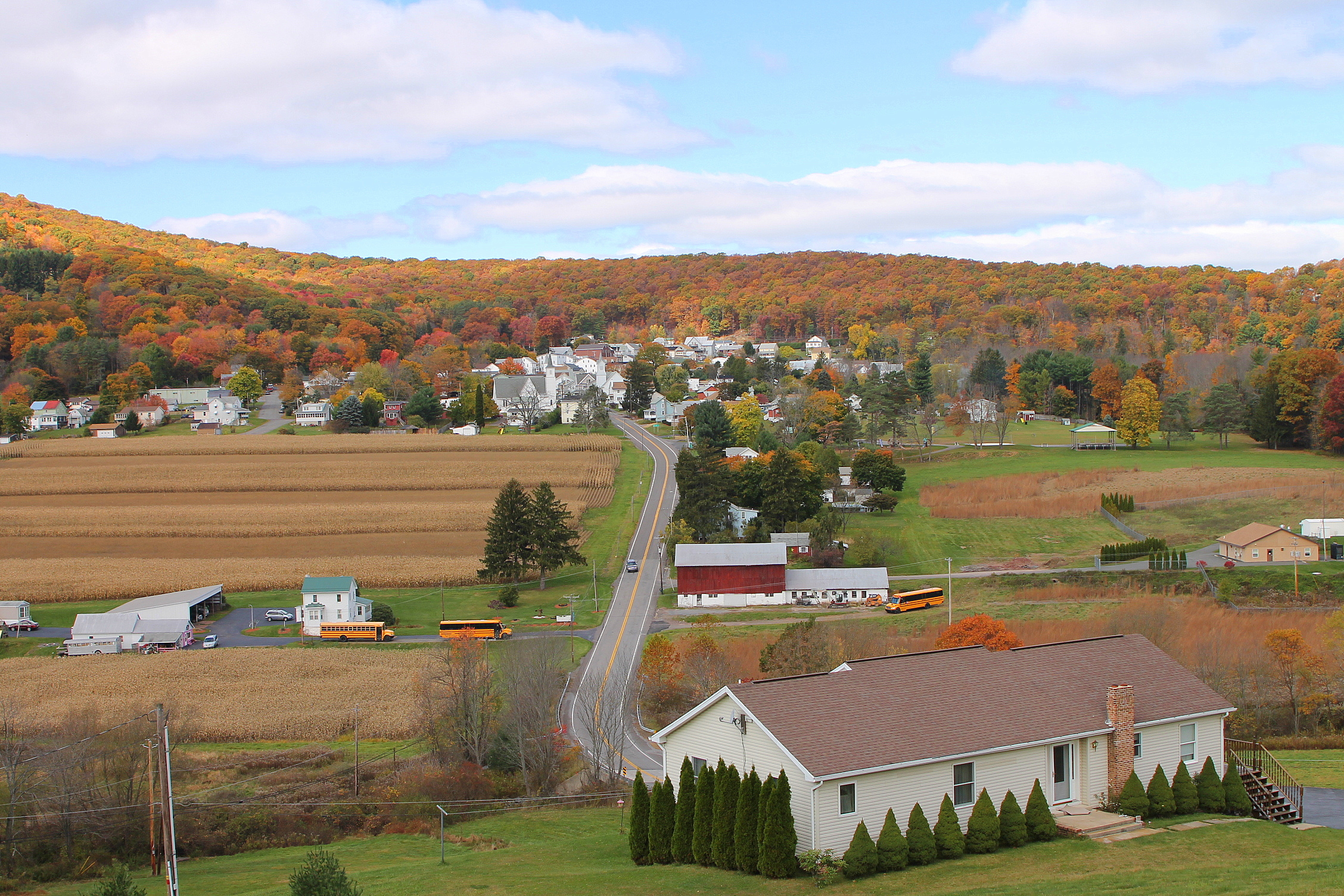
The farming community of Nuremberg

== Demographics ==
Historical population
| Census | Pop. | Note | %± |
|---|---|---|---|
| 2000 | 2,132 | | — |
| 2010 | 2,016 | | −5.4% |
| 2020 | 1,904 | | −5.6% |
| 2021 (est.) | 1,904 | | 0.0% |

At the 2000 census there were 2,132 people, 832 households, and 609 families living in the township. The population density was 87.2 inhabitants per square mile (33.7/km^{2}). There were 965 housing units at an average density of 39.5 units per square mile (15.3 units/km^{2}). The racial makeup of the township was 99.16% White, 0.52% African American, 0.09% Native American, 0.05% Asian, 0.09% from other races, and 0.09% from two or more races. Hispanic or Latino of any race were 0.47%.

There were 832 households, 28.6% had children under the age of 18 living with them, 61.3% were married couples living together, 8.1% had a female householder with no husband present, and 26.8% were non-families. 23.6% of households were made up of individuals, and 11.1% were one person aged 65 or older. The average household size was 2.53 and the average family size was 2.98.

The age distribution was 22.4% under the age of 18, 6.4% from 18 to 24, 25.0% from 25 to 44, 28.8% from 45 to 64, and 17.4% 65 or older. The median age was 43 years. For every 100 females, there were 106.6 males. For every 100 females age 18 and over, there were 100.6 males.

The median household income was $35,028 and the median family income was $41,250. Males had a median income of $31,279 versus $17,382 for females. The per capita income for the township was $17,675. About 7.8% of families and 11.7% of the population were below the poverty line, including 12.2% of those under age 18 and 16.3% of those age 65 or over.
