= Fisher Run =

Tributary of Catawissa Creek in Pennsylvania

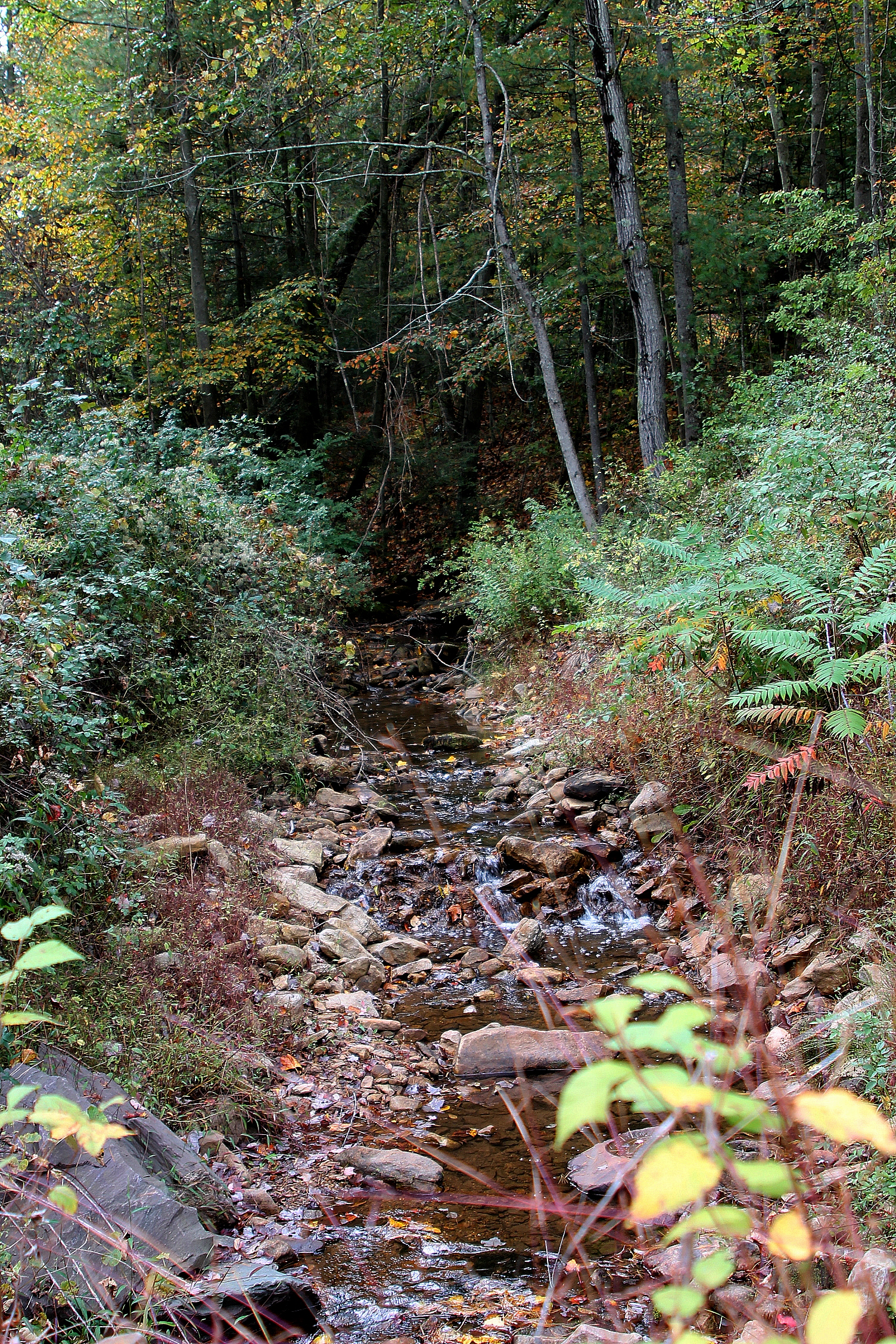
- Fisher Run looking upstream in its lower reaches
- Etymology: named after Isaac Fisher

Physical characteristics
- Source
  - location: Catawissa Mountain in Main Township, Columbia County, Pennsylvania
  - elevation: 1,340 ft (410 m)
- Mouth
  - location: Catawissa Creek in Beaver Township, Columbia County, Pennsylvania
  - coordinates: 40°57′24″N 76°21′20″W
  - elevation: 574 ft (175 m)
- Length: 2.9 mi (4.7 km)
- Basin size: 3.03 mi^{2} (7.8 km^{2})

Basin features
- Progression: Catawissa Creek → Susquehanna River → Chesapeake Bay
- Tributaries
  - right: "Trib 27549 To Fisher Run"

Fisher Run is a tributary of Catawissa Creek in Columbia County, Pennsylvania, in the United States. It is approximately 2.9 miles (4.7 km) long and flows through Main Township and Beaver Township. The stream is impaired by acid mine drainage. It is considered to be a high-quality coldwater fishery and Class A Wild Trout Waters. The watershed of the stream has an area of 3.03 square miles (7.8 km^{2}).

== Course ==
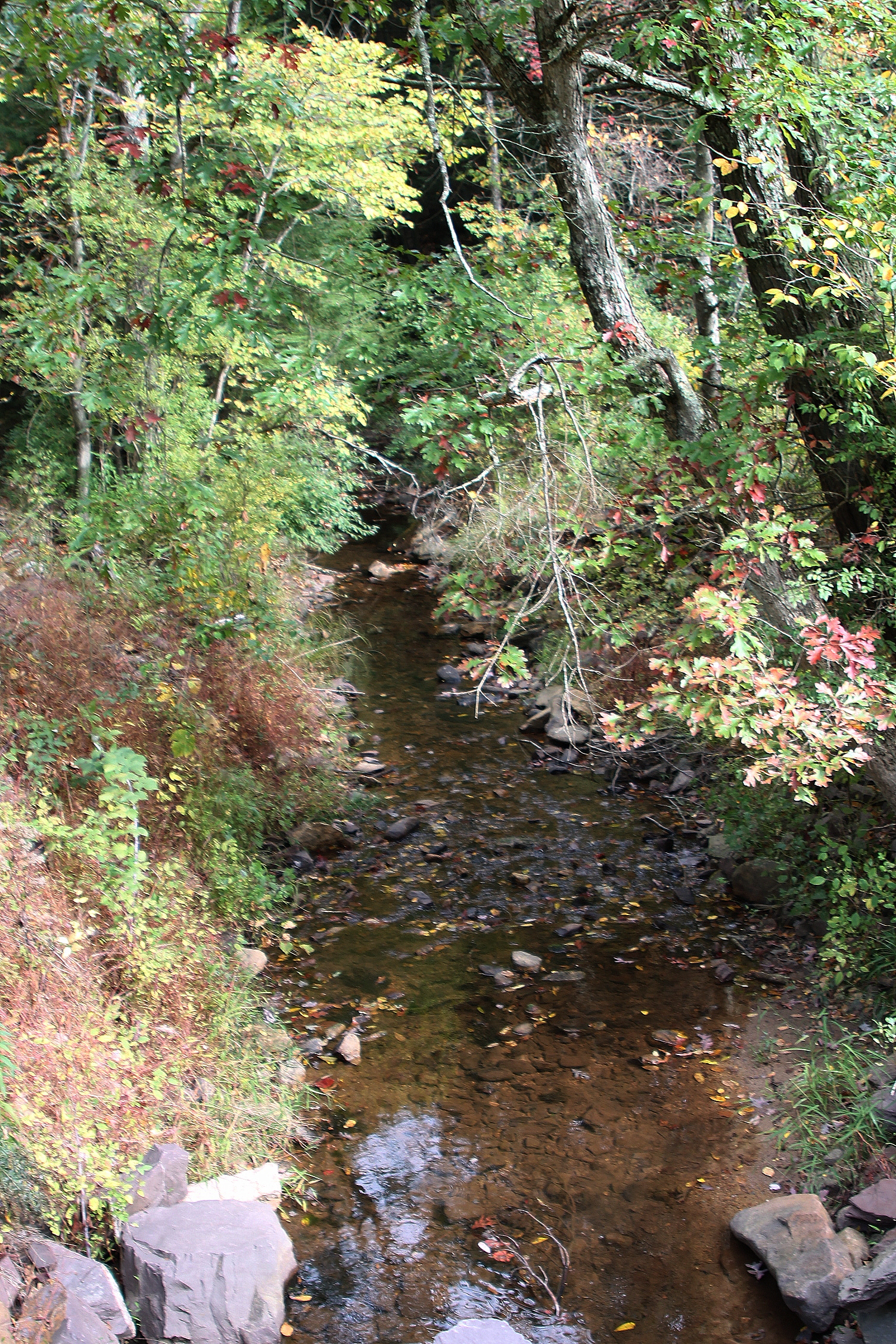
Fisher Run looking downstream in its lower reaches

Fisher Run begins on Catawissa Mountain in southwestern Main Township. The stream flows east in a valley and crosses a road within a few tenths of a mile. A short distance later, it turns northeast for well over a mile. It eventually crosses Fisher Run Road and then Iron Bridge Road. Immediately after crossing Iron Bridge Road, the stream turns southeast and enters Beaver Township. In Beaver Township, the stream almost immediately reaches its confluence with Catawissa Creek.

Fisher Run joins Catawissa Creek 8.78 miles (14.13 km) upstream of its mouth.

=== Tributaries ===
Fisher Run has one unnamed tributary. It is known as "Trib 27549 To Fisher Run".

== Hydrology ==
Fisher Run is considered to be impaired by acid mine drainage and metals. It is one of several streams and creeks in the watershed of Catawissa Creek with this impairment. The pH of the stream is between 6.0 and 6.9. The total concentration of alkalinity is 4 milligrams per liter.

== Geography and geology ==
The elevation near the mouth of Fisher Run is 574 feet (175 m) above sea level. The elevation of the stream's source is approximately 1,340 feet (410 m) above sea level.

Most of the upper reaches of the watershed of Fisher Run are on rock of the Pocono Formation and most of the lower reaches are on rock of the Mauch Chunk Formation. However, the southern part of the watershed is on rock of the Spechty Kopf Formation and the Buddys Run Member of the Catskill Formation.

The main soils in the watershed of Fisher Run are the Leck Kill soil, the Hazleton soil, and the Watson soil.

== Watershed, history, and etymology ==
The watershed of Fisher Run has an area of 3.03 square miles (7.8 km^{2}). Most of the watershed is in Main Township. However, substantial areas of it are in Catawissa Township and Roaring Creek Township. A small portion of the watershed is in Beaver Township.

The upper reaches and most of the rest of the watershed of Fisher Run are in Pennsylvania State Game Lands Number 58. However, the stream flows through agricultural land in its lower reaches.

Fisher Run is most likely named after Isaac Fisher.

== Biology ==
The Pennsylvania Department of Environmental Protection considers Fisher Run to be a high-quality coldwater fishery. It is also considered by the Pennsylvania Fish and Boat Commission to be Class A Wild Trout Waters between its headwaters and its mouth. The stream is inhabited by brook trout, which also reproduce naturally throughout the stream.

== See also ==
- Scotch Run (Catawissa Creek), next tributary of Catawissa Creek going downstream
- Mine Gap Run, next tributary of Catawissa Creek going upstream
- List of tributaries of Catawissa Creek
