= Beaver Run (Catawissa Creek tributary) =

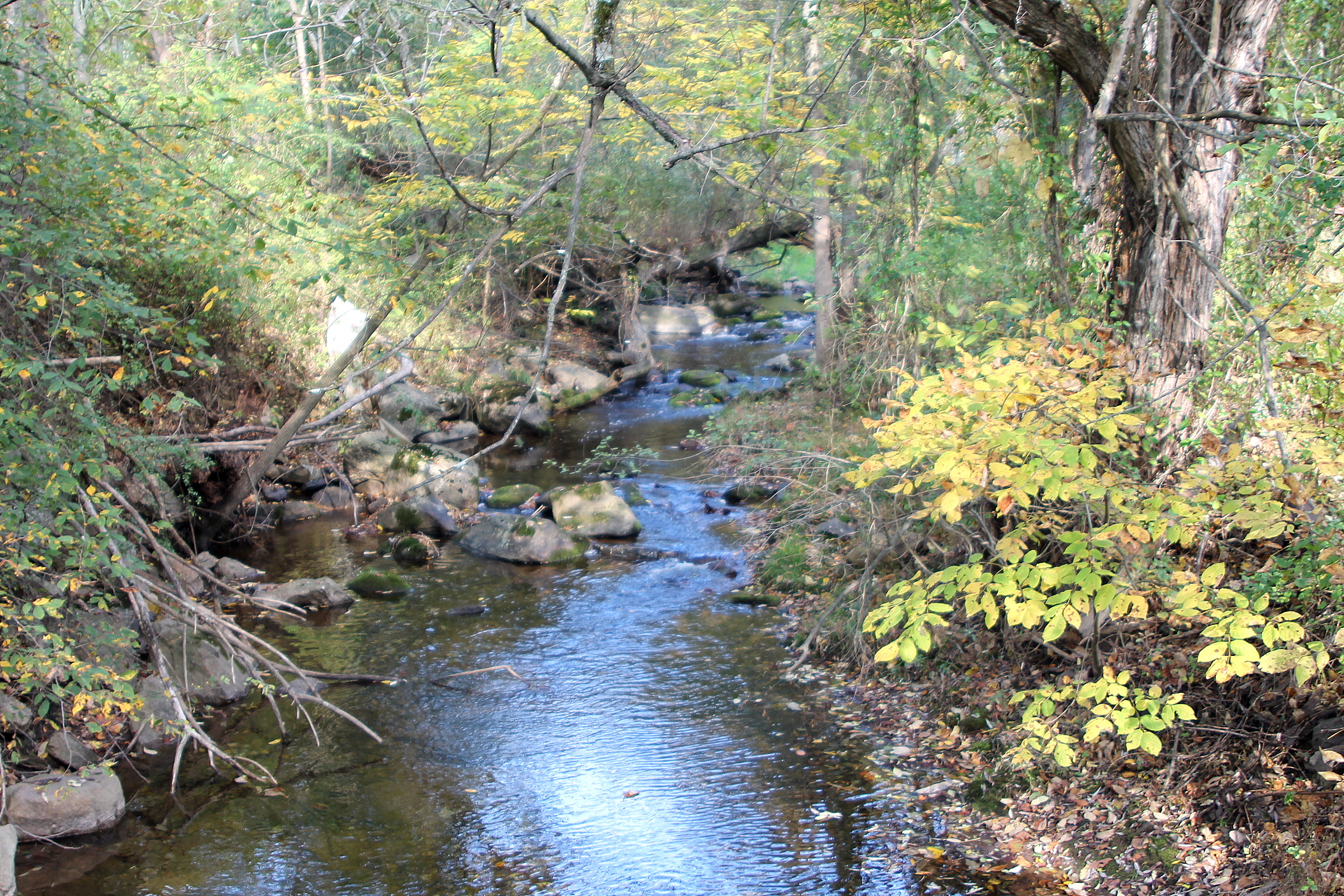
- Etymology: named after beavers

Physical characteristics
- Source
  - location: valley in Beaver Township, Columbia County, Pennsylvaniavalley in Beaver Township, Columbia County, Pennsylvania
  - elevation: 1,040 ft (320 m)
- Mouth
  - location: Catawissa Creek in Beaver Township, Columbia County, Pennsylvania
  - coordinates: 40°57′08″N 76°18′33″W
  - elevation: 649 ft (198 m)
- Length: 6.2 mi (10.0 km)
- Basin size: 9.60 mi^{2} (24.9 km^{2})

Basin features
- Progression: Catawissa Creek → Susquehanna River → Chesapeake Bay

Beaver Run is a tributary of Catawissa Creek in Columbia County, Pennsylvania, in the United States. It is approximately 6.2 miles (10.0 km) long and flows through Beaver Township. The stream's watershed has an area of 9.60 miles (15.45 km). Wetlands are present in the watershed. The stream was named by Alexander McCauley in 1774.

== Course ==
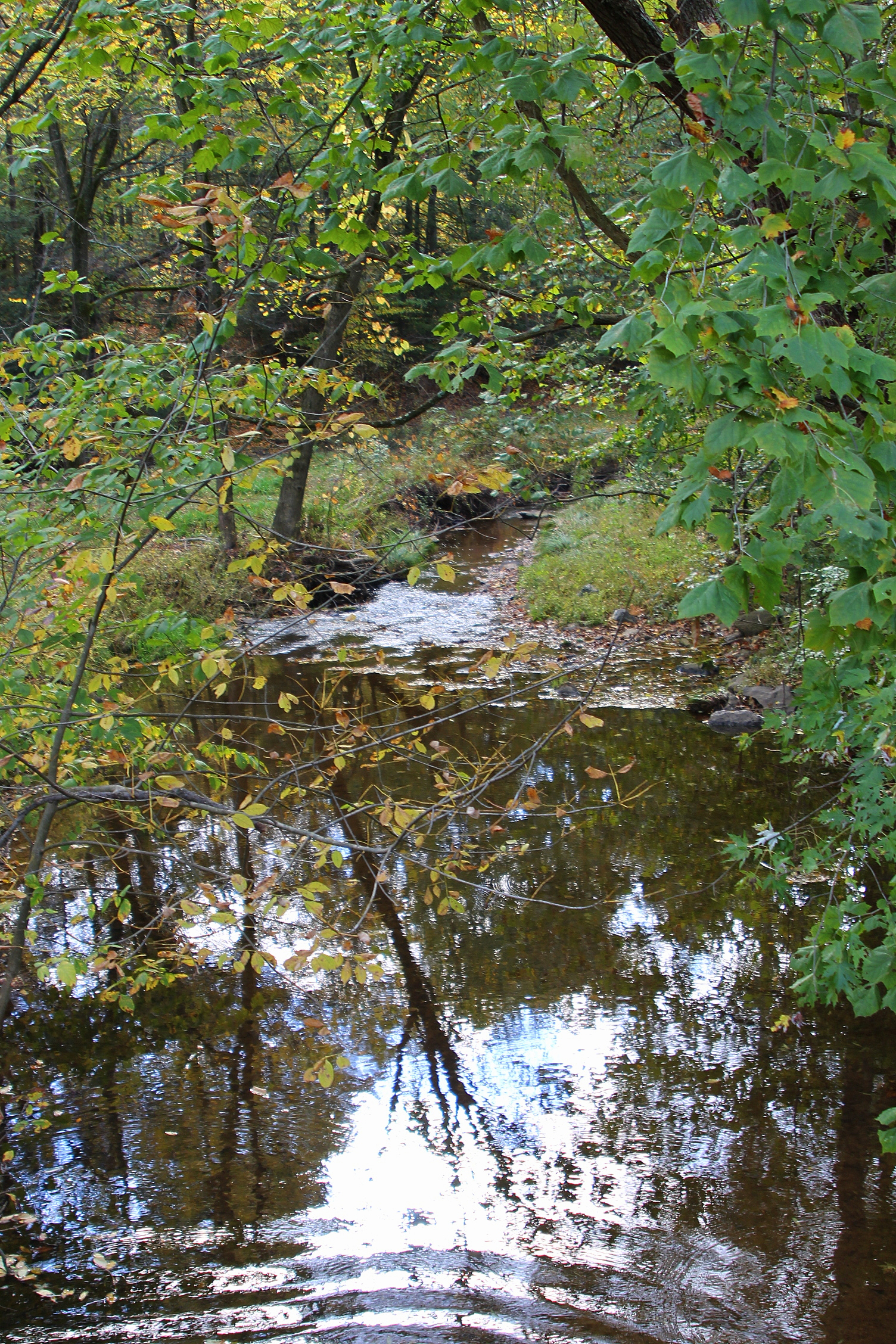
Beaver Run looking downstream near Shumans, Pennsylvania, not far from its mouth

Beaver Run begins in a valley in Beaver Township, a few hundred feet from the border between Columbia County and Luzerne County. The stream flows north for a short distance before turning west, flows west and slightly south for several miles between McCauley Mountain and Buck Mountain, eventually turns northwest and then southwest less than a mile later. A short distance downstream, it turns west and crosses Pennsylvania Route 339, then reaches its confluence with Catawissa Creek.

Beaver Run joins Catawissa Creek 13.02 miles (20.95 km) upstream of its mouth.

=== Tributaries ===
While Beaver Run has no named tributaries, it has two numbered tributaries: Trib 27552 and Trib 27553.

== Geography and geology ==
The elevation near the mouth of Beaver Run is 649 feet (198 m) above sea level. The elevation of the stream's source is just over 1,040 feet (320 m) above sea level.

Beaver Run is a fairly slow-moving stream. It is also relatively wide in some places.

The watershed of Beaver Run is mostly or entirely on rock of the Mauch Chunk Formation. The soil in the watershed is Leck Kill soil.

== Watershed ==
The watershed of Beaver Run has an area of 9.60 miles (15.45 km). Most of the watershed is in Beaver Township, Columbia County, but a small portion extends into Luzerne County. The wetlands on the creek's upper reaches are the largest and most biologically diverse wetlands in Columbia County.

Much of the watershed of Beaver Run is in agricultural land. The stream's valley is fairly narrow and situated between Buck Mountain and McCauley Mountain.

The community of Shumans is near the stream's mouth. Main roads in its watershed are Pennsylvania Route 339, Beaver Valley Road and Mountain Shadow Lane.

== History ==
Scotch Run was most likely named by Alexander McCauley in 1774. A legend says that he named the stream so after watching a group of beavers construct a dam on it. Beaver Township is in turn named after the stream.

In the late 1800s the Beaver Valley Post Office was near the mouth of Beaver Run.

Two bridges longer than 20 feet (6.1 m) have been built over Beaver Run. The first, a concrete slab bridge built in 1930, is 21.0 feet (6.4 m) long. The second, a steel stringer bridge built in 1934, is 29.9 feet (9.1 m) long.

== Biology ==
The wetlands of Beaver Run are listed as a "locally significant site" in the Columbia County Natural Areas Inventory. They rank in the inventory at 4 on a scale of 1 to 5, with 1 being the most important.

The wetlands of Beaver Run are a highbush blueberry / meadowsweet shrub swamp which includes trees and shrubs such as red elderberry, black ash, poison sumac, speckled alder, buttonbush, steeple-bush, and mountain holly. Other plants inhabiting these wetlands include various ferns and sedges and skunk cabbage, cattails, yellow pond lilies, smooth goldenrod, swamp candles, woolgrass, and several other plants.

A red maple / yellow birch / eastern hemlock palustrine forest is also found in the vicinity of Beaver Run, as is a buttonbush / highbush blueberry shrub swamp. Both of these habitats contain several plants not found in the highbush blueberry / meadowsweet shrub swamp.

A number of bird species have been observed in the Beaver Run wetlands. These include common yellowthroat, gray catbird, house wren, ovenbird, swamp sparrow, and yellow warbler. A dragonfly species known as the spangled skimmer also occurs in the wetlands. Beaver Run is considered by the Pennsylvania Department of Environmental Protection to be a coldwater fishery.

== See also ==
- Long Hollow (Catawissa Creek), next tributary of Catawissa Creek going upstream
- Mine Gap Run, next tributary of Catawissa Creek going downstream
- List of tributaries of Catawissa Creek
