= Pennsylvania State Game Lands Number 58 =

Park in the United States

- Location within Pennsylvania
- Location: Columbia County, Pennsylvania
- Nearest city: Mainville, Pennsylvania
- Coordinates: 40°55′0″N 76°19′0″W
- Area: 12,646 acres (5,118 ha)
- Designation: Pennsylvania State Game Lands
- Owner: Pennsylvania Game Commission

Pennsylvania State Game Lands Number 58 are Pennsylvania State Game Lands in Columbia County, Pennsylvania, in the United States. They are one of six State Game Lands in Columbia County and Montour County and are the second-largest of those State Game Lands. The game lands have an area of 12,646 acres and are mostly forested. Numerous streams are within the game land's boundaries and several game animals inhabit the area. There is a high level of bird biodiversity. Recreational opportunities in the state game lands include a rifle range and several trails.

== Geography ==
Pennsylvania State Game Lands #58 are situated near Mainville. They have an area of 12,646 acres. This is 61.4 percent of all the State Game Lands in Columbia County and 41.7 percent of all the protected land in the county. The game lands occupy portions of five townships: Beaver Township, Catawissa Township, Main Township, Mifflin Township, and Roaring Creek Township. The game lands have been described as being shaped like a dogleg.

The terrain in Pennsylvania State Game Lands #58 is described as "heavily forested and mountainous" by the Columbia-Montour Visitors Bureau. They are flatter in their northern reaches and more mountainous in their southern reaches. However, there are also foodplots and grassy areas. Rocky outcrops and ravines occur in the game lands. A fire tower is situated within the game lands. Most of them are on Catawissa Mountain, but a disconnected section is on Nescopeck Mountain. Numerous small streams flow through the game lands, including Furnace Run, Fisher Run, Mine Gap Run, Long Hollow, Stranger Hollow, Klingermans Run, and Cranberry Run. The game lands are in the watershed of Catawissa Creek.

Pennsylvania State Game Lands #58 are one of only three tracts of public forest in the watershed of Catawissa Creek. It comprises the vast majority of such land. The game lands are on part of a system of connected forested ridges running from Moosic Mountain to the Susquehanna River.

== Biology ==
Game animals occurring in Pennsylvania State Game Lands #58 include deer, bear, wild turkey, and grouse. Pheasants have also been hunted in the game lands and have been stocked there. The area has been managed for ruffed grouse and woodcocks.

Pennsylvania State Game Lands #58 have a high level of bird biodiversity. Bird species in the game lands include six warbler species, two vireo species, wood thrush, scarlet tanager, rose-breasted grosbeak, eastern wood pewee, barred owl, white-breasted nuthatch, and blue-gray gnatcatcher. Mammals observed there include eastern chipmunks, white-footed mice, short-tailed shrews, and red-backed voles. Reptiles and amphibians observed in the state game lands include box turtles, American toads, wood frogs, spotted salamanders, and garter snakes. Insects such as the black swallowtail and the tiger swallowtail are also found there.

Pennsylvania State Game Lands #58 are one of the largest remaining tracts of forested land in Columbia County. It mainly consists of deciduous forests, such as dry oak-heath forests and dry oak–mixed hardwood forests. However, other forest types such as pitch pine–mixed oak forest and hemlock-hardwood forest are present as well. Hemlock trees line many of the area's ravines and streams. A total of 1800 aspen seedlings were also planted in the game lands in 2011. Native, warm-season grasses inhabit the game lands as well.

== History and recreation ==
There is one designated hiking trail in Pennsylvania State Game Lands #58. It is 11.3 miles (18.2 km) long and loops from the base of Fire Tower Road up to the fire tower and back. Additionally, there are designated routes for horses and bicycles there. The game lands also contain a rifle range, which is at the entrance to the game lands, on Rifle Range Road near Pennsylvania Route 339. The game lands have four parking lots in their southern end and at least eight in their northern end. Some township roads lead to the game lands.

The old Reading Railroad corridor passes through Pennsylvania State Game Lands #58. In 2011, several acres of warm-season native grasses were burned in Pennsylvania State Game Lands #58 during a controlled burn. In 2014, 626 acres (253 ha) were slated for controlled burning.

In August 2013, Wildlife Conservation Officer John Morack stated that he intended to increase law enforcement patrols at the shooting range of Pennsylvania State Game Lands #58 to prevent vandalism and other illegal activities.

== See also ==
- Pennsylvania State Game Lands Number 13, also in Columbia County
- Pennsylvania State Game Lands Number 55, also in Columbia County
- Pennsylvania State Game Lands Number 226, also in Columbia County
- Pennsylvania State Game Lands Number 329, also in Columbia County
