= Mine Gap Run =

River in Pennsylvania, United States

- Etymology: named after nearby mines

Physical characteristics
- Source
  - location: Catawissa Mountain in Roaring Creek Township, Pennsylvania
  - elevation: 1,300 to 1,320 feet (400 to 400 m)
- Mouth
  - location: Catawissa Creek in Beaver Township, Columbia County, Pennsylvania
  - coordinates: 40°57′08″N 76°21′13″W
  - elevation: 577 ft (176 m)
- Length: 1.5 mi (2.4 km)
- Basin size: 0.92 mi^{2} (2.4 km^{2})

Basin features
- Progression: Catawissa Creek → Susquehanna River → Chesapeake Bay

Mine Gap Run is a tributary of Catawissa Creek in Columbia County, Pennsylvania, in the United States. It is approximately 1.5 miles (2.4 km) long and flows through Roaring Creek Township and Beaver Township. The watershed of the stream has an area of 0.92 square miles (2.4 km^{2}). The stream is polluted and acidic. However, it is considered to be a coldwater fishery. The main rock formations in the stream's watershed are the Mauch Chunk Formation, the Spechty Kopf Formation, the Pocono Formation, and the Buddys Run Member of the Catskill Formation.

== Course ==
Mine Gap Run begins on Catawissa Mountain in Roaring Creek Township. It crosses Mine Gap Road within a few hundred feet of its source and flows northeast in a valley for some distance. The stream eventually turns north for a few tenths of a mile. It then turns northeast and enters Beaver Township. A few tenths of a mile further downstream, it reaches its confluence with Catawissa Creek.

Mine Gap Run joins Catawissa Creek 9.12 miles (14.68 km) upstream of its mouth.

== Hydrology ==
Mine Gap Run experiences some form of pollution. The stream is acidic and infertile. Its pH is 6.6 and the concentration of alkalinity in it is 4 milligrams per liter.

== Geography and geology ==
The elevation near the mouth of Mine Gap Run is 577 feet (176 m) above sea level. The elevation of the stream's source is between 1,300 feet (400 m) and 1,320 feet (400 m) above sea level.

The lower reaches of Mine Gap Run are on rock of the Mauch Chunk Formation. The middle reaches of the stream are on rock of the Spechty Kopf Formation and the Pocono Formation. The stream's upper reaches are on rock of the Buddys Run Member of the Catskill Formation.

Mine Gap Run has a high gradient of 69.2 metres (227 ft) per kilometer (0.6 miles). The stream is 2.0 feet (0.61 m) wide.

== Watershed ==
The watershed of Mine Gap Run has an area of 0.92 square miles (2.4 km^{2}). The watershed is mostly in Roaring Creek Township, but a portion of it is in Beaver Township. Part of the watershed is in Pennsylvania State Game Lands Number 58. The watershed is in the Shumans United States Geological Survey quadrangle.

Mine Gap Run flows through forested land in its middle reaches. However, there is agricultural land in its upper and lower reaches. 72 percent of the stream is within 100 metres (330 ft) and 80 percent of the length of the stream is within 300 metres (980 ft) of a road. 90 percent of its length is within 500 feet (150 m) of a road.

== History, etymology, and recreation ==
Mine Gap Run is named after mines in its vicinity.

A 1992 report stated that Mine Gap Run was a poor site for angling.

== Biology ==
The Pennsylvania Department of Environmental Protection considers Mine Gap Run to be a cold water fishery. The water chemistry of the stream is suitable for brook trout and is similar to other streams with substantial populations of wild brook trout. However, no fish have been observed in it. The reason for this is unknown, but possible theories include a total fish kill. Stocking of fingerling brook trout in the stream has been proposed.

== See also ==
- Fisher Run, next tributary of Catawissa Creek going downstream
- Beaver Run (Catawissa Creek), next tributary of Catawissa Creek going upstream
- List of tributaries of Catawissa Creek
