= Klingermans Run =

Klingermans Run Klingerman Run
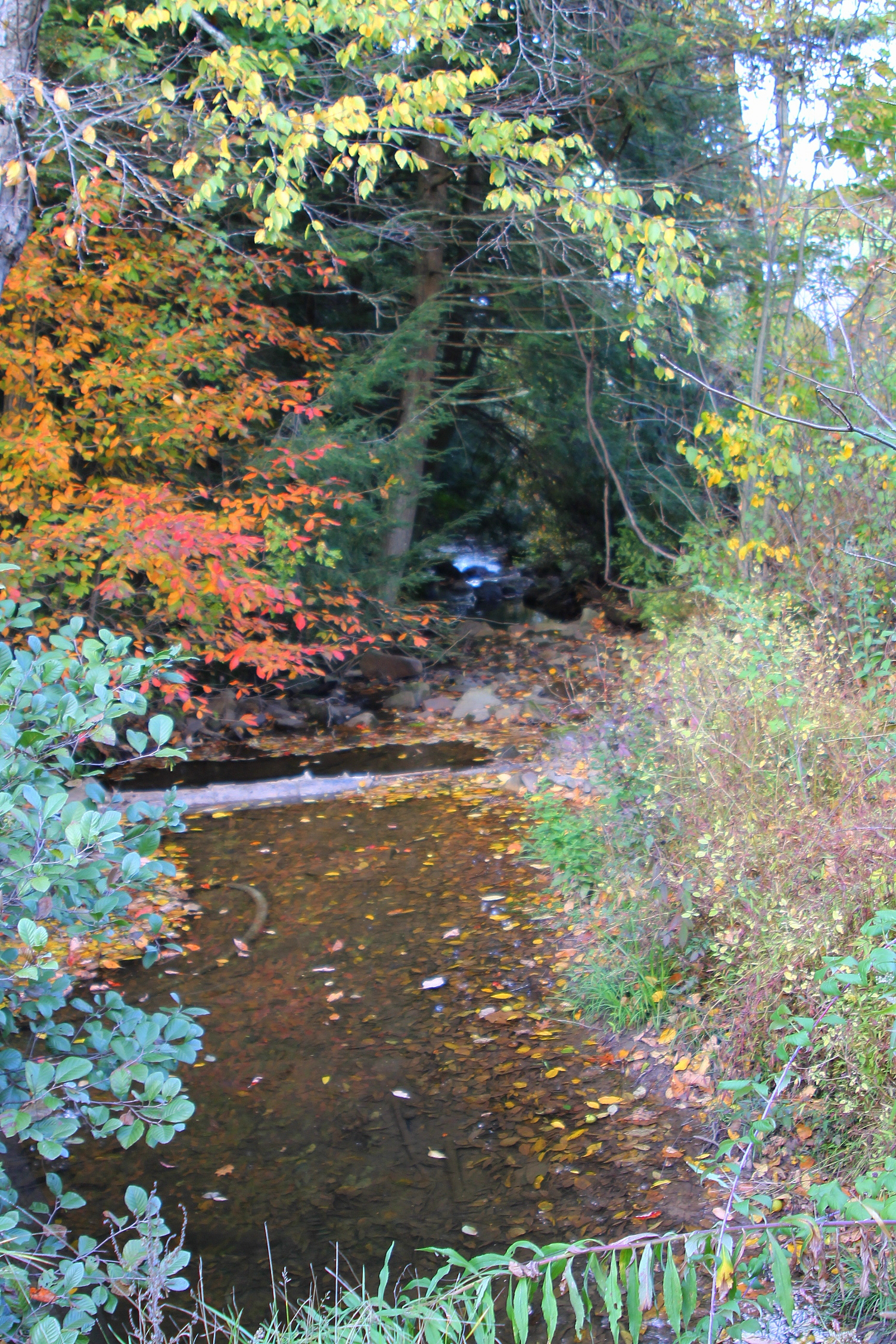
- Klingermans Run looking downstream near its mouth

Physical characteristics
- Source
  - location: Catawissa Mountain in Roaring Creek Township, Pennsylvania
  - elevation: 1,600 ft (490 m)
- Mouth
  - location: Catawissa Creek in Beaver Township, Columbia County, Pennsylvania
  - coordinates: 40°55′26″N 76°16′03″W
  - elevation: 738 ft (225 m)
- Length: 2.4 mi (3.9 km)
- Basin size: 1.78 mi^{2} (4.6 km^{2})

Basin features
- Progression: Catawissa Creek → Susquehanna River → Chesapeake Bay

Klingermans Run (also known as Klingerman Run) is a tributary of Catawissa Creek in Columbia County, Pennsylvania, in the United States. It is approximately 2.4 miles (3.9 km) long and flows through Roaring Creek Township and Beaver Township. The watershed of the stream has an area of 1.78 square miles (4.6 km^{2}). The stream is considered to be a High-Quality Coldwater Fishery and Class A Wild Trout Waters. The main rock formations in the stream's watershed are the Mauch Chunk Formation and the Pocono Formation and the main soils are the Leck Kill soil and the Hazleton soil.

== Course ==
Klingermans Run begins on Catawissa Mountain in Roaring Creek Township. It flows east and very slightly north for more than a mile, entering Beaver Township before turning north-northeast for a few tenths of a mile. The stream then turns northeast for some distance before turning north. A few tenths of a mile downstream, it reaches its confluence with Catawissa Creek near Beaver Station Road.

Klingermans Run joins Catawissa Creek 17.08 miles (27.49 km) upstream of its mouth.

=== Tributaries ===
Klingermans Run has no tributaries, named or unnamed.

== Hydrology ==
The concentration of alkalinity in the waters of Klingermans Run is 1 milligram per liter. The pH of the stream is 6.0. The stream's water hardness is 2 milligrams per liter.

At 12:55 P.M. on June 23, 1997, the air temperature in the vicinity of Klingermans Run was measured to be 31 °C (88 °F). The water temperature of the stream at that time was 13.4 °C (56.1 °F). The specific conductivity of the waters of the stream is 20 umhos.

== Geography and geology ==
The elevation near the mouth of Klingermans Run is 738 feet (225 m) above sea level. The elevation at the source of the stream is approximately 1,600 feet (490 m) above sea level.

The lower reaches of Klingermans Run are on rock of the Mauch Chunk Formation. The upper reaches of the stream are on rock of the Pocono Formation. The Leck Kill soil is found on the lower reaches of the stream. The rest of the stream is on Hazleton soil.

Klingermans Run has a high gradient of 66.1 meters per kilometer. The stream is 3.1 metres (10 ft) wide.

== Watershed and history ==
The watershed of Klingermans Run has an area of 1.78 square miles (4.6 km^{2}). The watershed of the stream is mostly in Beaver Township, but a substantial portion is in Roaring Creek Township. Almost all of the watershed is in forested land, but a small portion is in agricultural land. The headwaters of the stream are in Pennsylvania State Game Lands Number 58, as is the rest of the upper half of the watershed.

Klingermans Run is the nearest stream to Cranberry Run. The two streams have similar geology and land use. Klingermans Run is in the United States Geological Survey quadrangle for Shumans.

A total of 24 percent of the length of Klingermans Run is within 328 feet (100 m) of a road, while 29 percent of the stream's length is within 984 feet (300 m) of a road and 43 percent is within 1,640 feet (500 m) of a road. In 1990, the population density of the watershed was 9 people per square kilometer.

W. Klingerman, J. Klingerman, and I. Klingerman all historically owned property in the vicinity of Klingermans Run.

== Biology ==
Klingermans Run is considered by the Pennsylvania Department of Environmental Protection to be a High-Quality Coldwater Fishery, but was considered to be a Coldwater Fishery as late as 1997. The stream is considered by the Pennsylvania Fish and Boat Commission to be Class A Wild Trout Waters between its headwaters and its mouth. It is inhabited by brook trout, but they are the only species of fish in the stream. These trout range between 2.5 centimetres (0.98 in) and 22.4 centimetres (8.8 in) in length. Their biomass is 33.90 kilograms per hectare. Trout also naturally reproduce in the stream.

Klingermans Run was described as a poor site for angling in a 1997 report.

== See also ==
- Stranger Hollow, next tributary of Catawissa Creek going downstream
- Cranberry Run, next tributary of Catawissa Creek going upstream
- List of tributaries of Catawissa Creek
