= Long Hollow (Catawissa Creek tributary) =

River in Columbia County, Pennsylvania

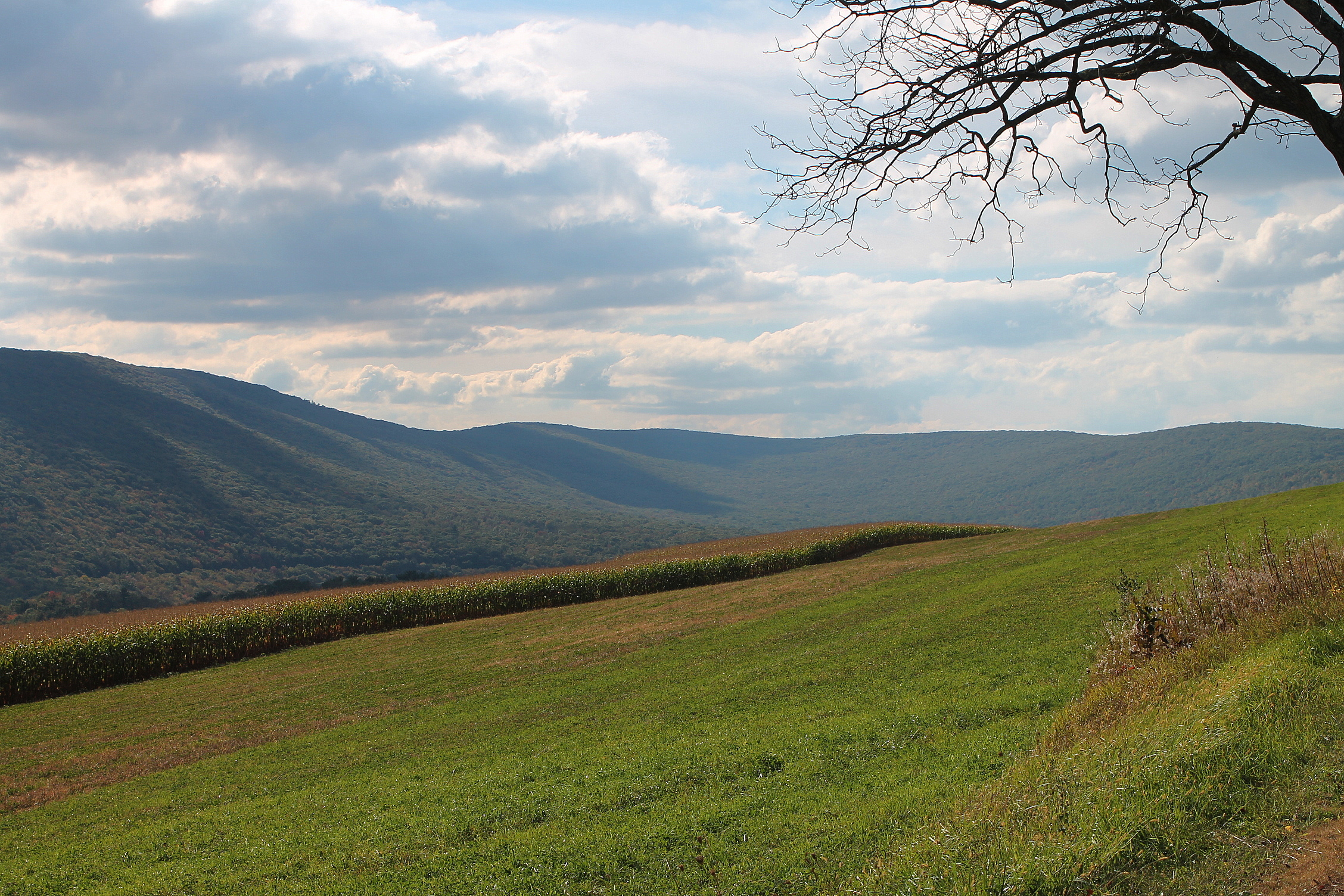
- The valley of Long Hollow

Physical characteristics
- Source
  - location: Catawissa Mountain in Roaring Creek Township, Pennsylvania
  - elevation: 1,380 to 1,400 feet (420 to 430 m)
- Mouth
  - location: Catawissa Creek in Beaver Township, Columbia County, Pennsylvania
  - coordinates: 40°56′31″N 76°18′24″W
  - elevation: 705 ft (215 m)
- Length: 2.5 mi (4.0 km)
- Basin size: 2.84 sq mi (7.4 km^{2})

Basin features
- Progression: Catawissa Creek → Susquehanna River → Chesapeake Bay
- Tributaries
  - right: "Trib 27555 to Long Hollow"

Long Hollow (historically known as Long Hollow Run) is a tributary of Catawissa Creek in Columbia County, Pennsylvania, in the United States. It is approximately 2.5 miles (4.0 km) long and flows through Roaring Creek Township and Beaver Township. The watershed of the stream has an area of 2.84 square miles (7.4 km^{2}). The stream has a neutral pH and is considered to be a coldwater fishery. The main rock formations in the stream's watershed are the Mauch Chunk Formation, the Spechty Kopf Formation, the Pocono Formation, and the Buddys Run Member of the Catskill Formation.

== Course ==
Long Hollow begins on Catawissa Mountain in Roaring Creek Township. It flows east for a few tenths of a mile. The stream then enters Beaver Township. It continues east, and after a sort distance, the stream receives an unnamed tributary. It then continues roughly east for considerably more than a mile in a deep valley. At the end of the valley, the stream reaches its confluence with Catawissa Creek.

Long Hollow joins Catawissa Creek 13.82 miles (22.24 km) upstream of its mouth.

=== Tributaries ===
Long Hollow has one unnamed tributary. It is known as "Trib 27555 to Long Hollow".

== Hydrology ==
The pH of Long Hollow downstream of "Trib 27555 to Long Hollow" is between 7.0 and 7.5 and the concentration of alkalinity is four milligrams per liter. The pH upstream of this point is unknown. The stream is infertile and acidic, with the potential to be affected by acid precipitation. The total level of water hardness of the stream in milligrams per liter is 4.

The specific conductance of the waters of Long Hollow is 22 umhos.

At noon on June 26, 1997, the air temperature in the vicinity of Long Hollow was 25 °C (77 °F). The water temperature of the stream at that time was 13 °C (55 °F).

== Geography and geology ==
The elevation near the mouth of Long Hollow is 705 feet (215 m) above sea level. The elevation of the stream's source is between 1,380 feet (420 m) and 1,400 feet (430 m).

The lower reaches of Long Hollow are on rock of the Mauch Chunk Formation, and the upper reaches are on rock of the Pocono Formation. The stream's unnamed tributary is on rock of the Spechty Kopf Formation and the Buddys Run Member of the Catskill Formation. The main soils in the watershed are the Leck Kill soil and the Hazleton soil.

The headwaters of Long Hollow are on Catawissa Mountain.

Long Hollow is a small stream with a width of 3.2 metres (10 ft). It has a high gradient of 62.7 metres (206 ft) per kilometer (0.62 miles).

== Watershed and history ==
The watershed of Long Hollow has an area of 2.84 square miles (7.4 km^{2}). The majority of the watershed is in Beaver Township, but a substantial portion is also in Roaring Creek Township. Nearly all of the watershed is forested. However, there are some areas of agricultural land in its lower reaches. The headwaters, upper reaches, and middle reaches of the stream are in the Pennsylvania State Game Lands Number 58. The watershed is in the Shumans United States Geological Survey quadrangle.

Eight percent of the length of Long Hollow is within 100 metres (330 ft) of a road. 14 percent is within 300 metres (980 ft) of a road and 20 percent is within 500 metres (1,600 ft) of one. In 1990, the population density of the watershed was eight people per square kilometer.

The watershed of Long Hollow is described as "unspoiled" in a 1997 report.

In the early 1900s, the Philadelphia and Reading Railway requested permission to build a concrete arch culvert across Long Hollow. A bridge was also once built across the stream. It was 1,050 feet (320 m) long and 136 feet (41 m) high.

A bridge over Long Hollow was swept away during the 1904 Susquehanna River Floods.

== Biology ==
Long Hollow is considered by the Pennsylvania Department of Environmental Protection to be a coldwater fishery. However, a 1997 report suggested upgrading the stream's designation to high-quality coldwater fishery. It is also a Class B wild trout fishery.

Two species of fish inhabit Long Hollow: brook trout and brown trout. Only one brown trout has been observed in the stream. The biomass of wild brook trout in the stream is 23.67 kilograms (52.2 lb) per hectare. The length of these trout range between 2.5 centimetres (0.98 in) and 19.9 centimetres (7.8 in) in length. Trout reproduce naturally in the stream between its headwaters and its mouth.

Long Hollow is considered to be a poor site for angling.

== See also ==
- Beaver Run (Catawissa Creek), next tributary of Catawissa Creek going downstream
- Stranger Hollow, next tributary of Catawissa Creek going upstream
- List of tributaries of Catawissa Creek
