= Cranberry Run =

Stream in Columbia County, Pennsylvania, US

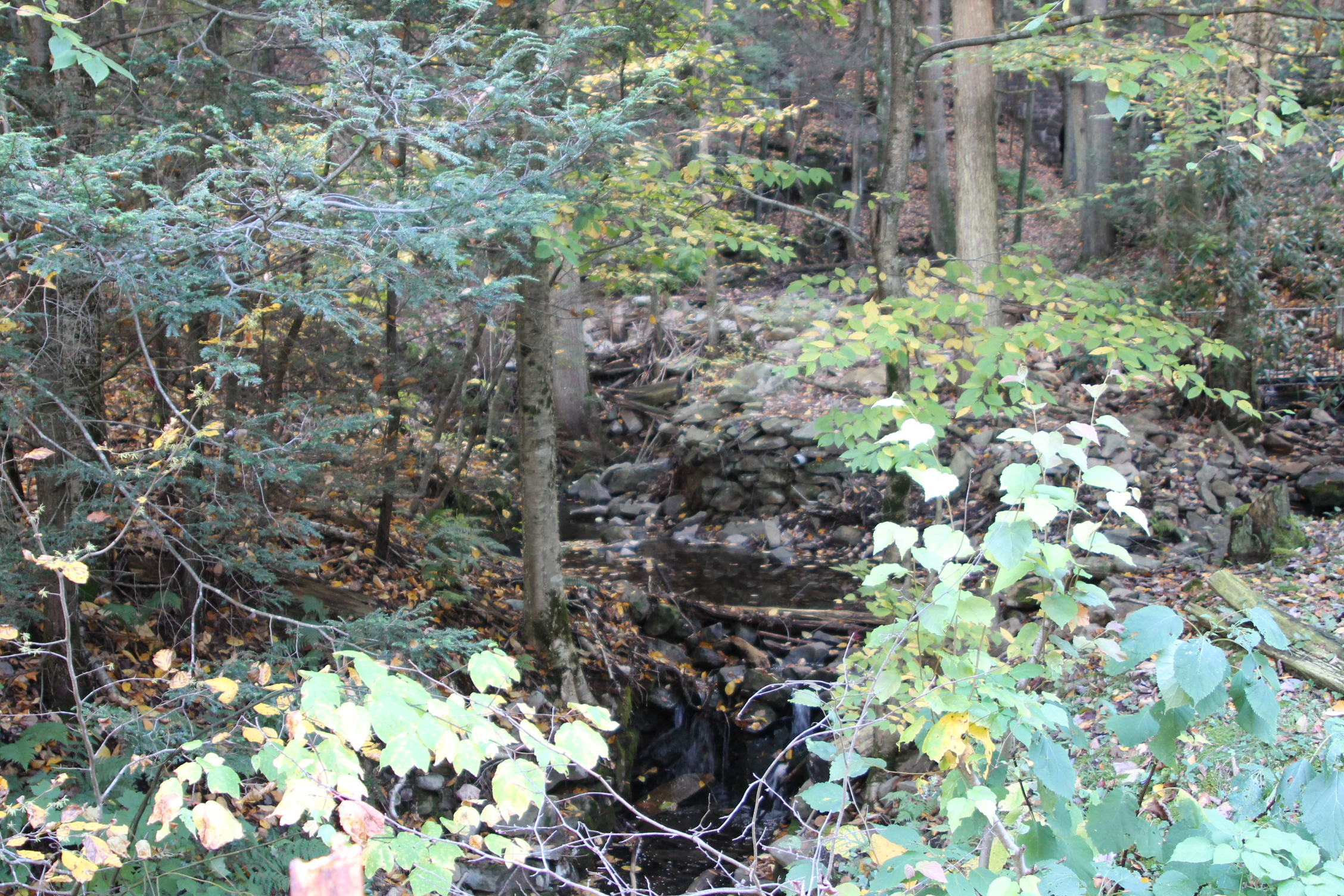
- Cranberry Run in its lower reaches
- Etymology: cranberry bogs at its headwaters

Physical characteristics
- Source
  - location: Catawissa Mountain in Beaver Township, Columbia County, Pennsylvania
  - elevation: 1,660 ft (510 m)
- Mouth
  - location: Catawissa Creek in Beaver Township, Columbia County, Pennsylvania
  - coordinates: 40°55′13″N 76°15′19″W
  - elevation: 754 ft (230 m)
- Length: 2.0 mi (3.2 km)
- Basin size: 1.83 mi^{2} (4.7 km^{2})

Basin features
- Progression: Catawissa Creek → Susquehanna River → Chesapeake Bay

Cranberry Run is a tributary of Catawissa Creek in Columbia County, Pennsylvania, in the United States. It is approximately 2.0 miles (3.2 km) long and flows through Beaver Township. The watershed of the stream has an area of 1.83 square miles (4.7 km^{2}). The stream is considered to be a Coldwater Fishery. The main rock formations in the stream's watershed are the Mauch Chunk Formation and the Pocono Formation and the main soils are the Leck Kill soil and the Hazleton soil.

== Course ==
Cranberry Run begins on Catawissa Mountain in Beaver Township. It flows northeast in a valley for over a mile, getting within several hundred feet of the border between Columbia County and Schuylkill County. The stream eventually turns roughly north, crosses Bunker Hill Road, and flows between Catawissa Mountain and Bunker Hill, getting further from the county line. After crossing Cranberry Run Road, it turns northeast and reaches its confluence with Catawissa Creek after a few hundred feet.

Cranberry Run joins Catawissa Creek 18.57 miles (29.89 km) upstream of its mouth.

=== Tributaries ===
Cranberry Run has no tributaries, named or unnamed.

== Hydrology ==
A total of 2.0 miles (3.2 km) of Cranberry Run is considered to be impaired by atmospheric deposition due to pH. It also experiences some form of pollution. The stream is highly acidic and affected by acidic precipitation. Its pH is 5.8 and the total concentration of alkalinity is 0 milligrams per liter. The cranberry bogs at the headwaters of the stream may contribute to its acidity. The concentration of water hardness in the stream is 4 milligrams per liter.

At 1:25 P.M. on June 24, 1997, the air temperature in the vicinity of Cranberry Run was 19 °C (66 °F). The water temperature of the stream at that time was 13.3 °C (55.9 °F). The specific conductance of the stream is 22 umhos.

== Geography and geology ==
The elevation near the mouth of Cranberry Run is 754 feet (230 m) above sea level. The elevation of the stream's source is approximately 1,660 feet (510 m) above sea level.

The lower reaches of Cranberry Run are on rock of the Mauch Chunk Formation. The upper reaches of the stream is on rock of the Pocono Formation. The lower reaches of the stream are on Leck Kill soil and the rest of the stream is on Hazleton soil.

A small hill known as Bunker Hill is located near Cranberry Run. Catawissa Mountain is also in the vicinity of the stream. Very few areas along the stream are prone to flooding.

Cranberry Run has a high gradient of 86.8 meters per kilometer. It is also a small stream, with a width of 2.7 meters.

== Watershed, history, and etymology ==
The watershed of Cranberry Run has an area of 1.83 square miles (4.7 km^{2}). A large portion of the watershed is in Beaver Township, Columbia County. However, a small area of it is in Roaring Creek Township, Columbia County and a substantial portion is in North Union Township, Schuylkill County. The headwaters of the stream are in Pennsylvania State Game Lands Number 58, as are part of the rest of the stream. Most of the watershed is forested, but there is some agricultural land in the lower reaches of the watershed.

Ten percent of the length of Cranberry Run is within 100 meters of a road. 15 percent of the stream's length is within 300 meters of a road and 19 percent is within 500 meters of one. In 1990, the population density of the watershed was 10 people per square kilometer.

Cranberry Run is very close to Klingermans Run and the two streams have similar geologies and land uses.

Cranberry Run is in the United States Geological Survey quadrangle of Shumans.

Cranberry Run's name comes from the fact that it is in the vicinity of a marsh and that cranberries were historically grown near the stream.

== Biology ==
Cranberry Run is considered by the Pennsylvania Department of Environmental Protection to be a coldwater fishery. However, no fish have been observed in the stream and it is incapable of supporting fish life due to acid precipitation. Wild brook trout have historically inhabited the stream.

There are natural cranberry bogs in the headwaters of Cranberry Run.

== See also ==
- Klingermans Run, next tributary of Catawissa Creek going downstream
- Crooked Run (Catawissa Creek), next tributary of Catawissa Creek going upstream
- List of tributaries of Catawissa Creek
