= Crooked Run (Catawissa Creek tributary) =

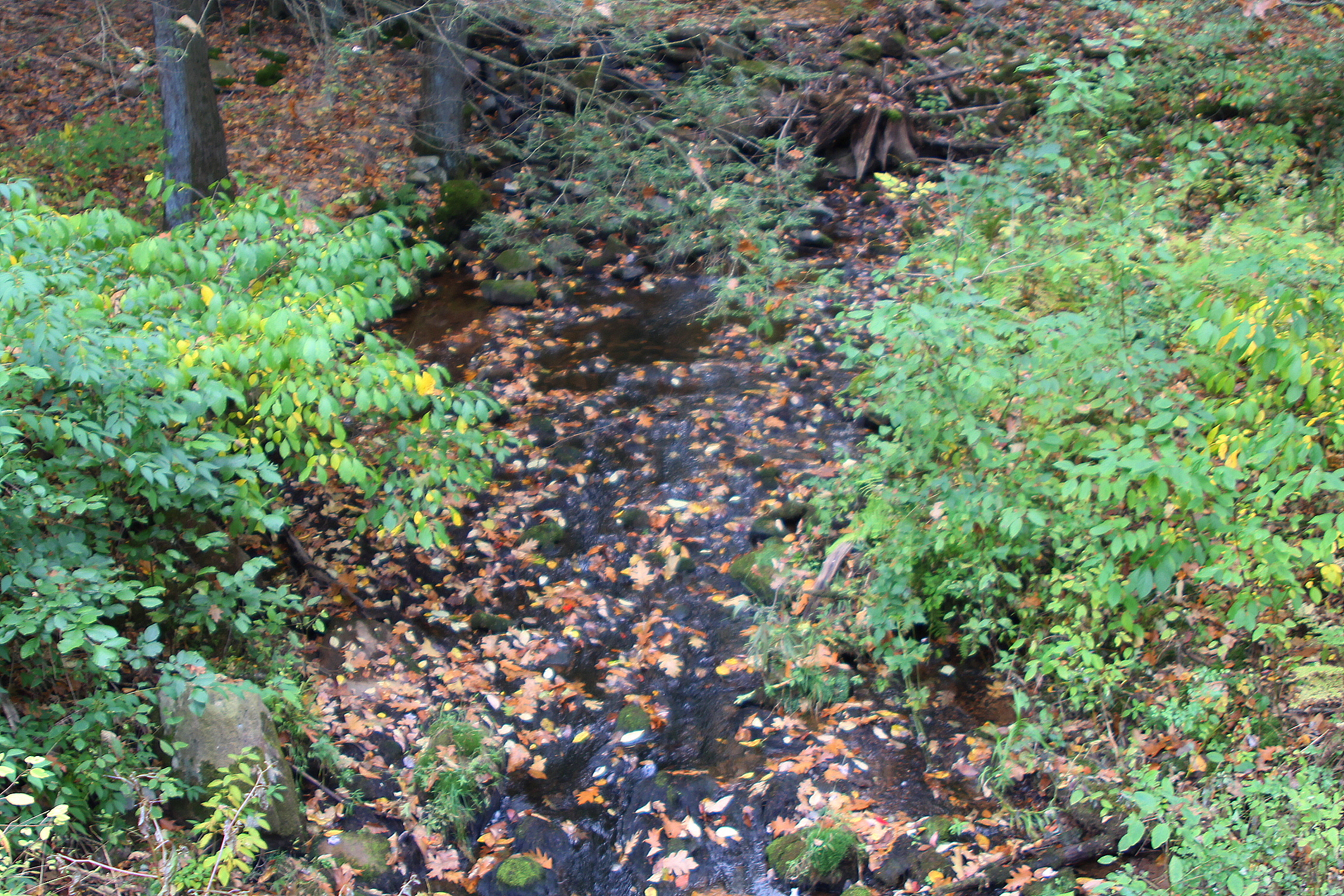
- Crooked Run looking upstream

Physical characteristics
- Source
  - location: Catawissa Mountain in North Union Township, Schuylkill County, Pennsylvania
  - elevation: 1,720 ft (520 m)
- Mouth
  - location: Catawissa Creek in North Union Township, Schuylkill County, Pennsylvania
  - coordinates: 40°55′05″N 76°14′34″W
  - elevation: 771 ft (235 m)
- Length: 4.4 mi (7.1 km)
- Basin size: 4.24 mi^{2} (11.0 km^{2})

Basin features
- Progression: Catawissa Creek → Susquehanna River → Chesapeake Bay
- Tributaries
  - right: one unnamed tributary

Crooked Run is a tributary of Catawissa Creek in Schuylkill County, Pennsylvania, in the United States. It is approximately 4.4 miles (7.1 km) long and flows through North Union Township. The watershed of the stream has an area of 4.24 square miles (11.0 km^{2}). The stream is considered to be a High-Quality Coldwater Fishery and Class A Wild Trout Waters. However, it is impaired by atmospheric deposition. The main rock formations in the stream's watershed are the Mauch Chunk Formation and the Pocono Formation and the main soils are the Leck Kill soil and the Hazleton soil.

== Course ==
Crooked Run begins on Catawissa Mountain in North Union Township. It flows east-southeast for a few tenths of a mile before turning roughly east for some distance and eventually flowing off Catawissa Mountain. The stream then turns northeast and begins to skirt the edge of the mountain for more than a mile. It then turns north for a few tenths of a mile, crossing Raricks Road, before turning west and then north again, flowing parallel to Bunker Hill Road for a few tenths of a mile. Several tenths of a mile downstream, the stream reaches its confluence with Catawissa Creek, a few hundred feet from the border between Schuylkill County and Columbia County.

Crooked Run joins Catawissa Creek 20.20 miles (32.51 km) upstream of its mouth.

=== Tributaries ===
Crooked Run has one unnamed tributary.

== Hydrology ==
The upper reaches of Crooked Run are considered by the Pennsylvania Fish and Boat Commission to be impaired for aquatic life by atmospheric deposition due to pH. The stream is infertile and acidic, with the potential to be affected by acidic precipitation. The pH of the stream ranges from 5.8 to 6.6 and the concentration of alkalinity ranges from 3 to 5 milligrams per liter. An alkalinity concentration of 16 milligrams per liter has been observed using methyl orange 0.81 miles (1.30 km) upstream of the stream's mouth. The total concentration of water hardness in the stream is 5 milligrams per liter 2.75 miles (4.43 km) upstream of its mouth and 10 milligrams per liter 0.81 miles (1.30 km) upstream of the mouth.

On June 25, 1997, at 10:00 A.M., the air temperature in the vicinity of Crooked Run 0.81 miles (1.30 km) upstream of its mouth was 28 °C (82 °F) and the water temperature was 15.8 °C (60.4 °F). One hour and 35 minutes later, the air temperature near the stream 2.75 miles (4.43 km) upstream of its mouth was 34 °C (93 °F) and the water temperature was 14.3 °C (57.7 °F). The specific conductivity of the stream's waters 0.81 miles (1.30 km) upstream of its mouth and 2.75 miles (4.43 km) upstream of its mouth are 32 and 21 μmhos, respectively.

== Geography and geology ==
The elevation near the mouth of Crooked Run is 771 feet (235 m) above sea level. The elevation of the source of the stream is just over 1,720 feet (520 m) above sea level.

The upper reaches of Crooked Run are on rock of the Pocono Formation, which dates to the Mississippian Period. The rest of the stream flows over rock of the Mauch Chunk Formation. The lower reaches of the stream are on Leck Kill soil and the upper reaches are on Hazleton soil.

Crooked Run is a small stream, with a width of 2.9 meters (9.5 feet). It has a high gradient of 39.3 meters per kilometer.

== Watershed ==
The watershed of Crooked Run has an area of 4.24 square miles (11.0 km^{2}). Most of the watershed is in North Union Township. However, a substantial portion of it is in northern Union Township and a small portion is in southeastern Roaring Creek Township, Columbia County. The stream flows through agricultural land in its lower half. There are also forested lands in the watershed.

Crooked Run is in the United States Geological Survey quadrangles of Shumans and Nuremberg. The watershed is part of the Lower North Branch Susquehanna drainage basin.

22 percent of the length of Crooked Run is within 100 metres (330 ft) of a road. 49 percent of the stream's length is within 300 metres (980 ft) of a road and 65 percent is within 500 metres (1,600 ft) of one. In 1990, the population density of the watershed was 22 people per square kilometer.

== Biology ==
Crooked Run is considered by the Pennsylvania Department of Environmental Protection to be a High-Quality Coldwater Fishery. It is considered by the Pennsylvania Fish and Boat Commission to be Class A Wild Trout Waters between its headwaters and its mouth.

Brook trout inhabit Crooked Run 2.75 miles (4.43 km) upstream of their mouth and are the only fish inhabiting the stream at this point. In a survey 1997, their biomass at this location was measured to be 106.48 kilograms per hectare, which was the highest wild trout biomass of any tributary of Catawissa Creek observed during the survey. Brook trout less than 175 millimeters long make up 74.12 kilograms per hectare and brook trout more than 175 millimeters long make up 32.36 kilograms per hectare. The lengths of the trout in the stream range from 25 to 224 millimeters. Brook trout, brown trout, rainbow trout, and tiger trout were all observed in the stream 0.81 miles (1.30 km) upstream of its mouth, but many of these had escaped from the nearby Zion Grove Trout Hatchery.

There are 2315 brook trout per kilometer on Crooked Run, of which 2215 are less than 175 millimeters long and 100 are more than 175 millimeters long. There are 11,576 brook trout per hectare, of which 11,076 are less than 175 millimeters long and 500 are more than 175 millimeters long.

A 1997 report stated that Crooked Run was an excellent site for angling.

== See also ==
- Cranberry Run, next tributary of Catawissa Creek going downstream
- Tomhicken Creek, next tributary of Catawissa Creek going upstream
- List of tributaries of Catawissa Creek
