= Stranger Hollow =

Physical characteristics
- Source
  - location: Catawissa Mountain in Beaver Township, Columbia County, Pennsylvania
  - elevation: 1,440 to 1,460 feet (440 to 450 m)
- Mouth
  - location: Catawissa Creek in Beaver Township, Columbia County, Pennsylvania
  - coordinates: 40°55′52″N 76°17′25″W
  - elevation: 712 ft (217 m)
- Length: 1.0 mi (1.6 km)
- Basin size: 0.57 sq mi (1.5 km^{2})

Basin features
- Progression: Catawissa Creek → Susquehanna River → Chesapeake Bay

Stranger Hollow (also known as Stranger's Hollow) is a tributary of Catawissa Creek in Columbia County, Pennsylvania, in the United States. It is approximately 1.0 mile (1.6 km) long and flows through Beaver Township. The watershed of the stream has an area of 0.57 square miles (1.5 km^{2}). The stream is considered to be a coldwater fishery. The main rock formations in the stream's watershed are the Mauch Chunk Formation and the Pocono Formation and the main soils are the Leck Kill soil and the Hazleton soil. Historically the Catawissa Railroad and the Philadelphia and Reading Railway crossed over the stream.

== Course ==
Stranger Hollow begins on Catawissa Mountain in Beaver Township. It flows east for a few tenths of a mile and enters a valley. It eventually turns northeast for another few tenths of a mile before reaching its confluence with Catawissa Creek.

Stranger Hollow joins Catawissa Creek 15.42 miles (24.82 km) upstream of its mouth.

=== Tributaries ===
Stranger Hollow has no tributaries, named or unnamed.

== Hydrology ==
Stranger Hollow is considered to be impaired by atmospheric deposition due to pH. The pH of the stream is unknown.

== Geography and geology ==
The elevation near the mouth of Stranger Hollow is 712 feet (217 m) above sea level. The elevation of the stream at its source is between 1,440 feet (440 m) and 1,460 feet (450 m).

The lower reaches of Stranger Hollow are on rock of the Mauch Chunk Formation. The rest of the stream is on rock of the Pocono Formation. The lower reaches of the stream are on Leck Kill soil and the rest of the stream is on Hazleton soil.

Stranger Hollow has an extremely high gradient of 449.5 feet (137.0 m) per 0.62 miles (1.00 km).

== Watershed and history ==
The watershed of Stranger Hollow has an area of 0.57 square miles (1.5 km^{2}). Most of the watershed is in Beaver Township, but a small portion on its western side is in Roaring Creek Township. The headwaters of the stream are in Pennsylvania State Game Lands Number 58, as is most of the rest of the watershed. The watershed is almost entirely on forested land. It is in the Shumans United States Geological Survey quadrant.

It is difficult to access Stranger Hollow and no portion of the stream is within 500 metres (1,600 ft) of a road.

The population density of the watershed of Stranger Hollow was 10 people per square kilometer in 1990.

In the late 1800s, a railroad bridge carrying the Philadelphia and Reading Railway crossed Stranger Hollow. This bridge was known as the Stranger's Hollow Bridge and was 90 feet (27 m) high. The Catawissa Railroad bridge over the stream was 756 feet (230 m) long and 125 feet (38 m) high. An 1862 article described the view from the Catawissa Railroad near the stream as a "most striking and characteristic view".

== Biology ==
Stranger Hollow is considered by the Pennsylvania Department of Environmental Protection to be a coldwater fishery.

== See also ==
- Long Hollow (Catawissa Creek), next tributary of Catawissa Creek going downstream
- Klingermans Run, next tributary of Catawissa Creek going upstream
- List of tributaries of Catawissa Creek
