= A Masque of Reason =

1945 play by Robert Frost

First edition (publ. Henry Holt)

A Masque of Reason is a 1945 comedy play written by Robert Frost. This short play takes the form of a sequel to or satire on the Book of Job. It presents itself as the 43rd chapter of Job, which only has 42 chapters, so providing a concluding chapter in the form of a play.

Frost's Job is unsatisfied by God's answers, and, with his wife, continues to ask questions about suffering and God's inscrutability. At one point God replies "I was just showing off to the Devil".

The image of Steeple Bush is apparent in describing the tree.

== Plot summary ==
Job and his wife are sitting out under a palm tree when a tree, called the Burning Bush or The Christmas Tree, enlightens itself. The couple explain that this tree rustling is God, and he has come to talk to them. It ends up actually being God, and Job goes over and talks to him. God sets up his throne ("a plywood flat, prefabricated" that God pulls upright on its hinges to support him) and talks to Job about his condition (because he was ill). God then says "You are the Emancipator of your God, and as such I promote you a saint". Job is grateful of this title, and then his wife comes along, and tells God about her punishment when she was accused of witchcraft. God apologizes for his lack of action, explaining "That is not Of record in my Note Book."
