= List of tributaries of Catawissa Creek =

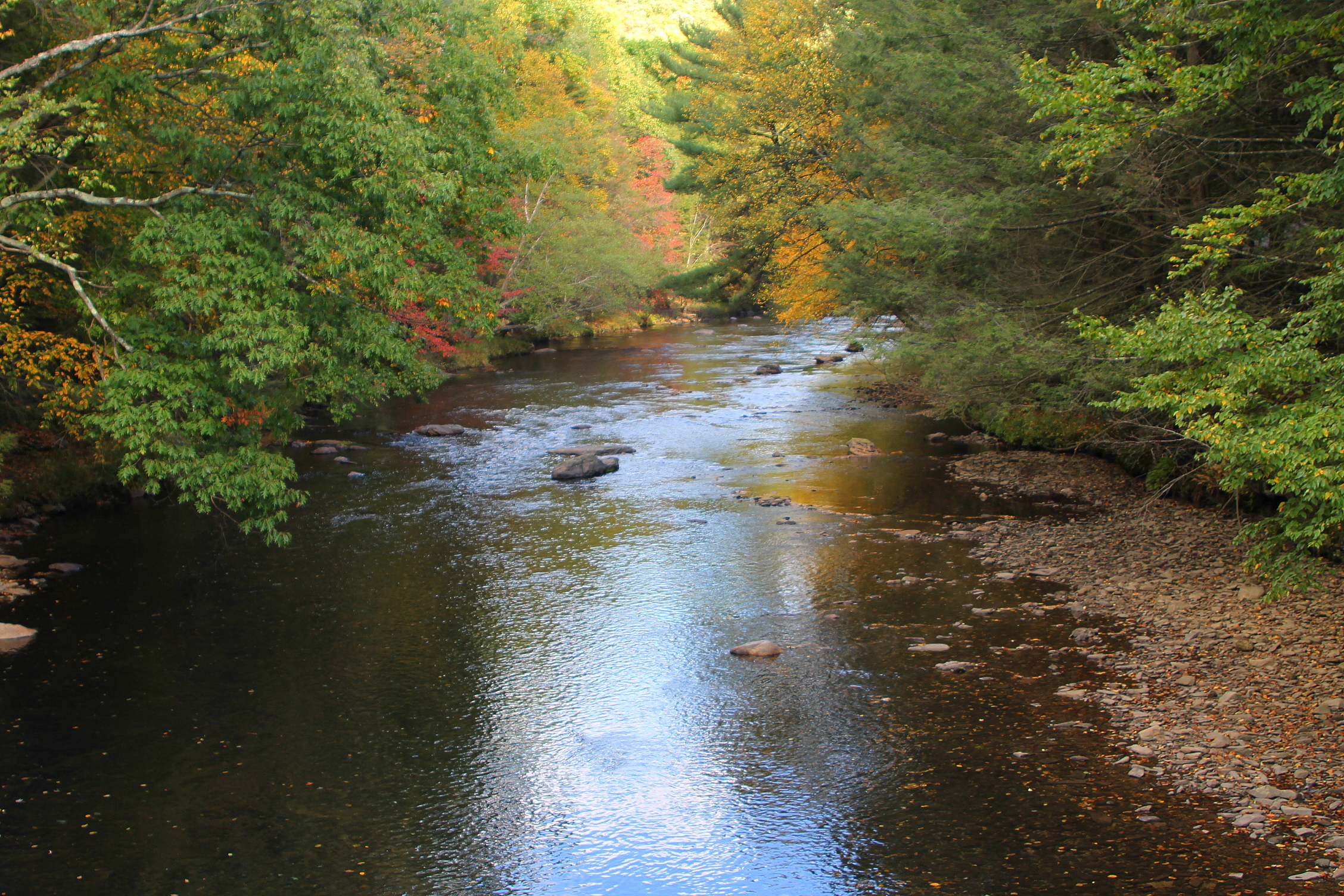
Catawissa Creek in southern Beaver Township, Columbia County, Pennsylvania, between its tributaries Cranberry Run and Klingermans Run

Catawissa Creek is a 41.8-mile (67.3 km) long creek flowing into the Susquehanna River with 26 named tributaries, of which 19 are direct tributaries. The creek flows through Luzerne, Schuylkill, and Columbia counties in Pennsylvania. The two shortest tributaries are approximately 1 mile (1.6 km) long, while the longest is about 10.8 miles (17.4 km) in length. The tributaries include seventeen runs, six creeks, and three hollows (unnamed streams named after named valleys that they flow through). By length, the five largest tributaries of Catawissa Creek are Little Catawissa Creek, Tomhicken Creek, Scotch Run, Beaver Run, and Messers Run. By watershed area, the five largest tributaries are Tomhicken Creek, Little Catawissa Creek, Beaver Run, Scotch Run, and Messers Run.

Various species of fish inhabit most of the tributaries of Catawissa Creek. The Pennsylvania Department of Environmental Protection considers eleven tributaries of the creek to be Coldwater Fisheries. (Note: Coldwater Fishery is an official designation that means that a stream supports fish from the family Salmonidae and other coldwater fauna and flora.) Another is a Coldwater Fishery for part of its length and a High-Quality Coldwater Fishery for the other part. (Note: High-Quality Coldwater Fishery is a designation for streams that meet the Coldwater Fishery criteria and also have high water quality) An additional twelve tributaries are High-Quality Coldwater Fisheries for their entire lengths. The Pennsylvania Fish and Boat Commission considers eleven tributaries to be Class A Wild Trout Waters. (Note: Class A Wild Trout Waters is a Pennsylvania Fish and Boat Commission designation for streams that "support a population of naturally produced trout of sufficient size and abundance to support a long-term and rewarding sport fishery" and are not stocked with fish.) Five tributaries have been observed to be devoid of fish life, and one other is suspected to lack fish as well. Most of the remaining tributaries are inhabited by between one and fourteen species of fish.

The tributaries of Catawissa Creek range from 4.6 to 25.6 feet (1.4 to 7.8 m) in width, with the vast majority being less than 13 feet (4 m) wide. Most of the tributaries' gradients are high, but some are low or moderate and one is extremely high. The tributaries occupy seven United States Geological Survey quadrangles: Catawissa, Shumans, Nuremberg, Conyngham, Ashland, Shenandoah, and Delano. Most of the tributaries are within several hundred meters of a road for at least part of their lengths.

The tributaries of Catawissa Creek have pHs ranging from 4.4 to 7.4. Their concentrations of alkalinity range from 0 to 42 milligrams per liter, with the significant majority having alkalinity concentrations under 20 milligrams per liter. The tributaries' concentrations of water hardness range from 0 to more than 150 milligrams per liter.

== Tributaries of Catawissa Creek ==
Name	Length	Watershed area	Distance from mouth	Mouth elevation	Source elevation	Coordinates	Image
Furnace Run	2.5 miles (4.0 km)	2.82 square miles (7.3 km^{2})	7.37 miles (11.86 km)	551 feet (168 m)	1,440 to 1,460 feet (440 to 450 m)	40.963602°N 76.373385°W	
Scotch Run	7.8 miles (12.6 km)	9.10 square miles (23.6 km^{2})	8.30 miles (13.36 km)	558 feet (170 m)	1,000 to 1,020 feet (300 to 310 m)	40.962897°N 76.357931°W	
Fisher Run	2.9 miles (4.7 km)	3.03 square miles (7.8 km^{2})	8.78 miles (14.13 km)	574 feet (175 m)	1,340 feet (410 m)	40.956632°N 76.355292°W	
Mine Gap Run	1.5 miles (2.4 km)	0.92 square miles (2.4 km^{2})	9.12 miles (14.68 km)	577 feet (176 m)	1,300 to 1,320 feet (400 to 400 m)	40.952113°N 76.353734°W	
Beaver Run	6.2 miles (10.0 km)	9.60 square miles (24.9 km^{2})	13.02 miles (20.95 km)	649 feet (198 m)	1,040 feet (320 m)	40.952137°N 76.309177°W	
Long Hollow	2.5 miles (4.0 km)	2.84 square miles (7.4 km^{2})	13.82 miles (22.24 km)	705 feet (215 m)	1,380 to 1,400 feet (420 to 430 m)	40.941888°N 76.306696°W	–
Stranger Hollow	1.0 mile (1.6 km)	0.57 square miles (1.5 km^{2})	15.42 miles (24.82 km)	712 feet (217 m)	1,440 to 1,460 feet (440 to 450 m)	40.930958°N 76.290318°W	–
Klingermans Run	2.4 miles (3.9 km)	1.78 square miles (4.6 km^{2})	17.08 miles (27.49 km)	738 feet (225 m)	1,600 feet (490 m)	40.923997°N 76.267688°W	
Cranberry Run	2.0 miles (3.2 km)	1.83 square miles (4.7 km^{2})	18.57 miles (29.89 km)	754 feet (230 m)	1,660 feet (510 m)	40.920404°N 76.255246°W	
Crooked Run	4.4 miles (7.1 km)	4.24 square miles (11.0 km^{2})	20.20 miles (32.51 km)	771 feet (235 m)	1,720 feet (520 m)	40.918152°N 76.242811°W	
Tomhicken Creek	10.1 miles (16.3 km)	21.00 square miles (54.4 km^{2})	22.38 miles (36.02 km)	780 to 800 feet (240 to 240 m)	1,740 to 1,760 feet (530 to 540 m)	40.910618°N 76.214425°W	
Little Catawissa Creek	10.8 miles (17.4 km)	16.70 square miles (43.3 km^{2})	24.24 miles (39.01 km)	833 feet (254 m)	1,360 to 1,380 feet (410 to 420 m)	40.890049°N 76.209098°W	
Dark Run	4.3 miles (6.9 km)	4.55 square miles (11.8 km^{2})	24.83 miles (39.96 km)	843 feet (257 m)	1,160 to 1,180 feet (350 to 360 m)	40.882063°N 76.206467°W	
Rattling Run	2.4 miles (3.9 km)	2.28 square miles (5.9 km^{2})	26.32 miles (42.36 km)	882 feet (269 m)	1,280 to 1,300 feet (390 to 400 m)	40.866311°N 76.194955°W	
Davis Run	1.2 miles (1.9 km)	2.86 square miles (7.4 km^{2})	30.56 miles (49.18 km)	971 feet (296 m)	1,280 to 1,300 feet (390 to 400 m)	40.874464°N 76.145948°W	
Messers Run	5.2 miles (8.4 km)	5.98 square miles (15.5 km^{2})	33.90 miles (54.56 km)	1,053 feet (321 m)	1,600 feet (490 m)	40.878167°N 76.095949°W	–
Spies Run	1.0 mile (1.6 km)	–	36.86 miles (59.32 km)	1,184 feet (361 m)	1,660 to 1,680 feet (510 to 510 m)	40.897405°N 76.068945°W	–
Cross Run	1.1 miles (1.8 km)	–	–	1,630 feet (500 m)	1,700 to 1,720 feet (520 to 520 m)	40.915965°N 76.025404°W	–
Hunkydory Creek	1.4 miles (2.3 km)	3.65 square miles (9.5 km^{2})	40.86 miles (65.76 km)	1,689 feet (515 m)	1,720 feet (520 m)	40.911522°N 76.012034°W	–

=== Tributaries of Tomhicken Creek ===
Name	Length	Watershed area	Distance from mouth	Mouth elevation	Source elevation	Coordinates	Image
Raccoon Creek	3.3 miles (5.3 km)	2.67 square miles (6.9 km^{2})	3.40 miles (5.47 km)	902 feet (275 m)	1,240 feet (380 m)	40.925517°N 76.174522°W	
Little Crooked Run	1.7 miles (2.7 km)	1.22 square miles (3.2 km^{2})	4.79 miles (7.71 km)	997 feet (304 m)	1,480 feet (450 m)	40.929896°N 76.154134°W	
Sugarloaf Creek	3.5 miles (5.6 km)	3.34 square miles (8.7 km^{2})	5.08 miles (8.18 km)	1,014 feet (309 m)	1,460 feet (450 m)	40.92653°N 76.150921°W	–
Little Tomhicken Creek	1.0 mile (1.6 km)	4.31 square miles (11.2 km^{2})	6.03 miles (9.70 km)	1,200 feet (370 m)	1,500 to 1,520 feet (460 to 460 m)	40.916358°N 76.143473°W	

=== Tributaries of Little Catawissa Creek ===
Name	Length	Watershed area	Distance from mouth	Mouth elevation	Source elevation	Coordinates	Image
Stony Run	2.2 miles (3.5 km)	2.24 square miles (5.8 km^{2})	1.96 miles (3.15 km)	912 feet (278 m)	1,460 to 1,480 feet (450 to 450 m)	40.881122°N 76.232535°W	
Trexler Run	3.4 miles (5.5 km)	3.81 square miles (9.9 km^{2})	4.24 miles (6.82 km)	1,000 feet (300 m)	1,560 feet (480 m)	40.864132°N 76.253792°W	

=== Tributaries of Messers Run ===
Name	Length	Watershed area	Distance from mouth	Mouth elevation	Source elevation	Coordinates	Image
Negro Hollow	1.7 miles (2.7 km)	1.57 square miles (4.1 km^{2})	0.80 miles (1.29 km)	1,128 feet (344 m)	1,800 feet (550 m)	40.869586°N 76.088485°W	–

== See also ==
- List of tributaries of Fishing Creek (North Branch Susquehanna River)
