= Steeplebush =

Steeplebush is a common name for several plants and may refer to:

- Spiraea douglasii, native to western North America
- Spiraea tomentosa, native to eastern North America

== See also ==
- Steeple Bush, poetry collection by Robert Frost
