= Mountain holly =

Mountain holly is a common name for several plants and may refer to:

- Olearia macrodonta, endemic to New Zealand
- Ilex montana, native to eastern North America
- Ilex mucronata, native to eastern North America
