= Catawissa Township, Pennsylvania =

Township in Pennsylvania, US

Coordinates: 40°58′00″N 76°25′59″W

- Township
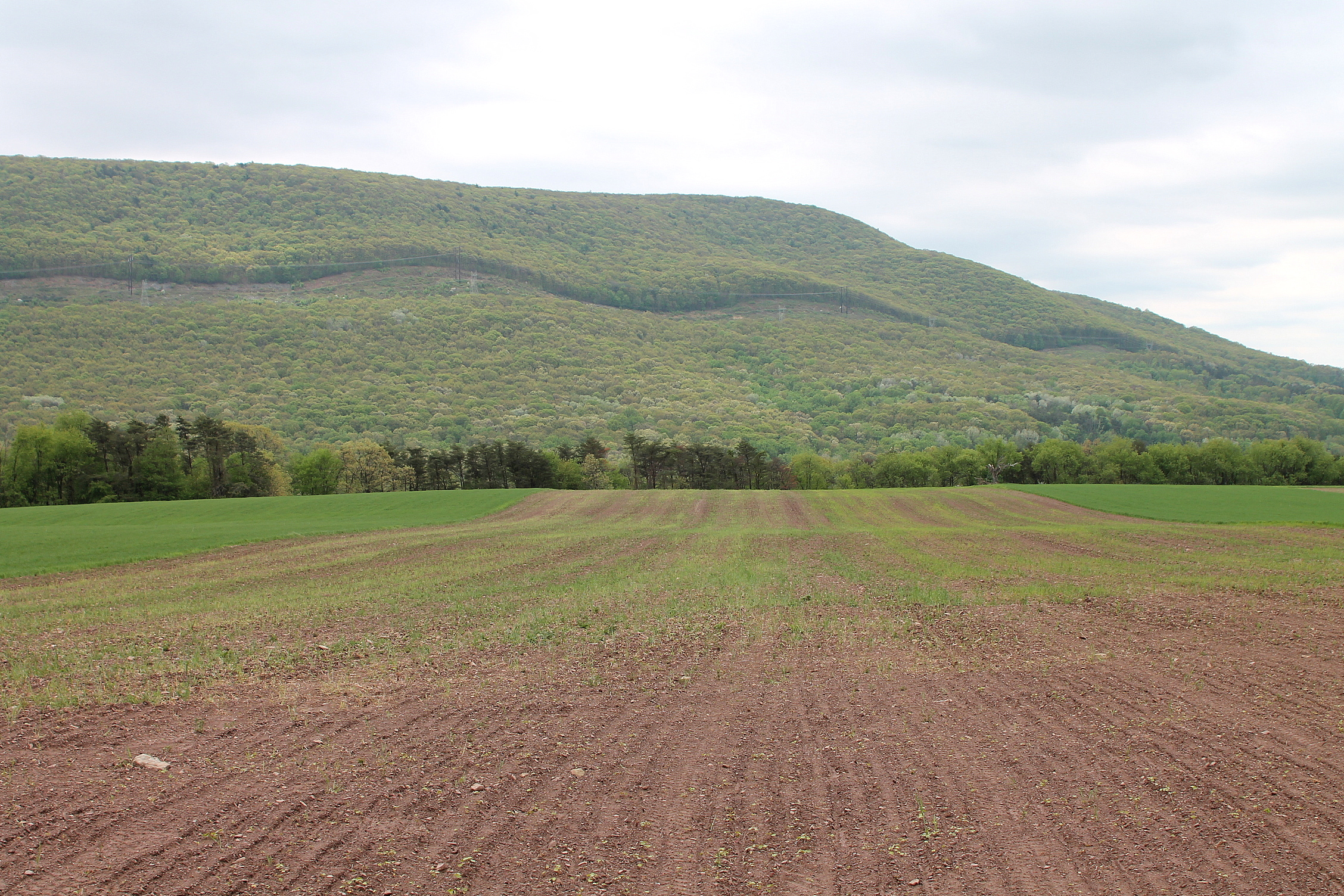
- Catawissa Mountain in Catawissa Township

- Logo

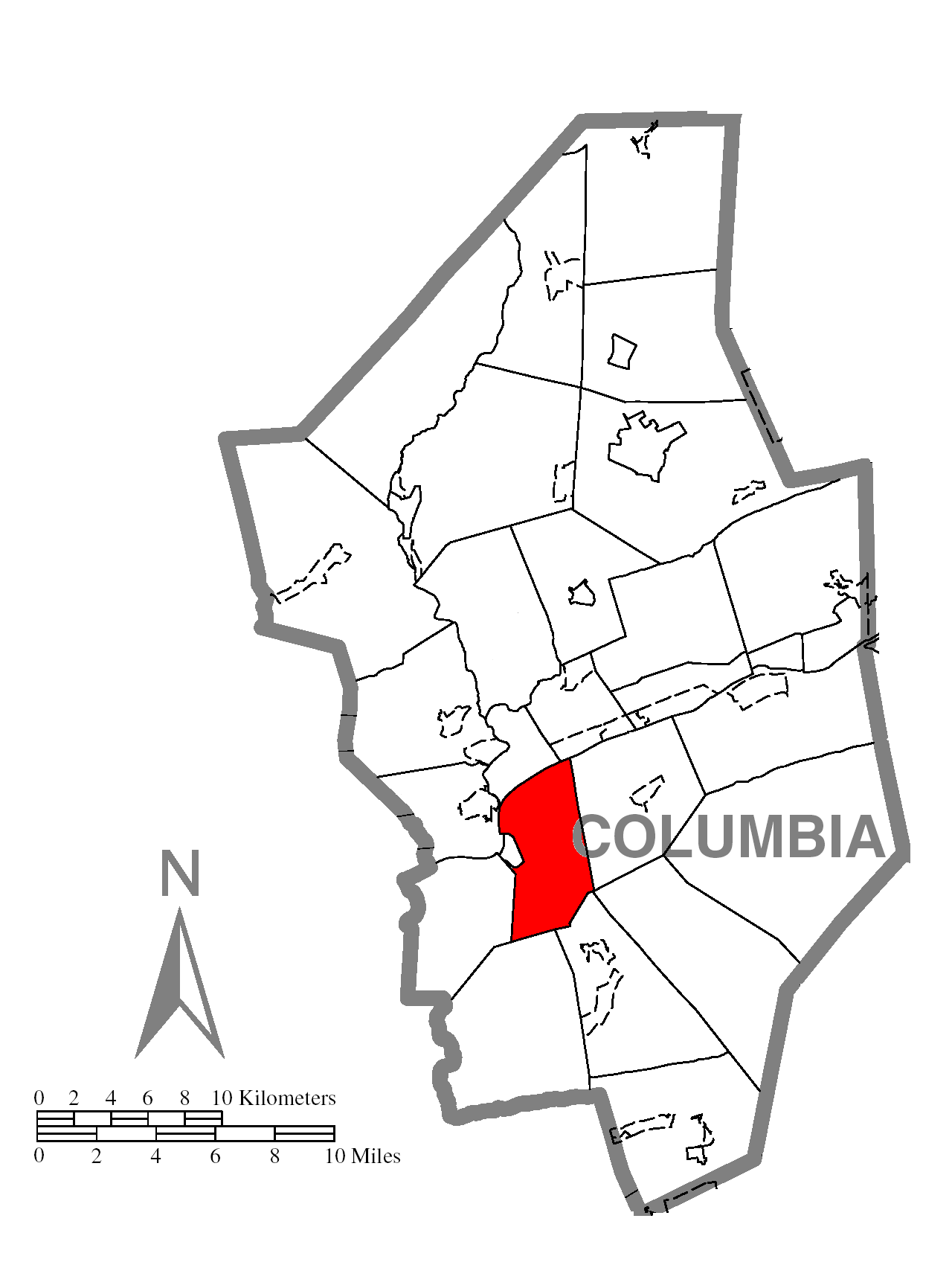
- Map of Columbia County, Pennsylvania highlighting Catawissa Township

- Map of Columbia County, Pennsylvania
- Country: United States
- State: Pennsylvania
- County: Columbia
- Settled: 1774
- Incorporated: 1785

Area
  - Total: 12.88 sq mi (33.36 km^{2})
  - Land: 12.36 sq mi (32.02 km^{2})
  - Water: 0.52 sq mi (1.34 km^{2})

Population (2020)
  - Total: 904 ▼
  - Estimate (2021): 908
  - Density: 77.3/sq mi (29.83/km^{2})
- Time zone: UTC-5 (Eastern (EST))
  - Summer (DST): UTC-4 (EDT)
- Area code: 570
- FIPS code: 42-037-11744
- Website: catawissatownship.org

Catawissa Township is a township near the borough of Catawissa, Columbia County, Pennsylvania. It is part of Northeastern Pennsylvania. The population was 904 at the 2020 census.

== History ==
Catawissa Township is the oldest municipality in Columbia County. It was first formed in 1785 from parts of Augusta Township. When first formed, Catawissa Township stretched from Montour County in the west to western Schuylkill County in the east. The creations of Roaring Creek Township, Franklin Township, and Main Township in 1832, 1843, and 1844 respectively, reduced the size of Catawissa Township significantly.

The first Native Americans to settle in the vicinity of the township were the Piscatawese, Conoys, or Gangawese, who built a wigwam in Catawissa. The first house in Catawissa Township was built in 1774 by Moses Roberts. By the mid to late 1770s, Quakers had arrived in the township. More settlers arrived in Catawissa Township in 1782. The same year, a group of Native Americans arrived in the area to re-establish a wigwam. This led to strife between them and the settlers, and several murders occurred.

In 1833, there were two furnaces and two forges within the boundaries of Catawissa Township as it was at that time.

The Hollingshead Covered Bridge No. 40 was listed on the National Register of Historic Places in 1979.

== Geography ==
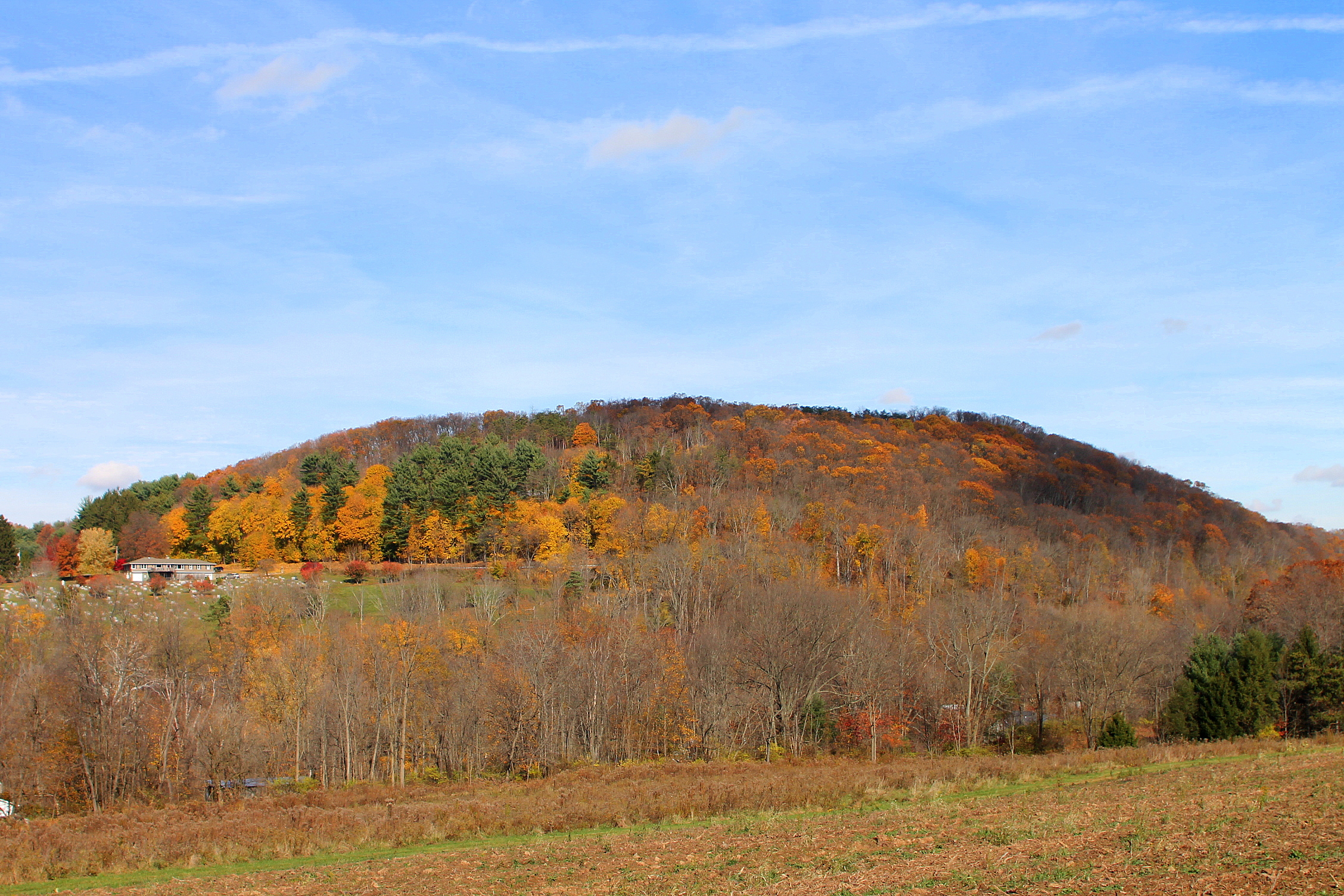
Scenery of Catawissa Township

Catawissa Township is located southwest of the center of Columbia County, across the Susquehanna River from Bloomsburg, the county seat. The township is bordered to the north and northwest by the Susquehanna, to the west by the borough of Catawissa, to the southwest by Franklin Township, to the south by Cleveland and Locust townships, and to the east by Main Township. Catawissa Mountain, elevation 1,817 feet (554 m), occupies the southeastern part of the township.

According to the United States Census Bureau, the township has a total area of 12.9 square miles (33.4 km^{2}), of which 12.4 square miles (32.0 km^{2}) is land and 0.50 square miles (1.3 km^{2}), or 4.01%, is water. Catawissa Creek flows east to west across the center of the township, entering Catawissa borough before emptying into the Susquehanna River.

=== Geology ===
Iron ore is abundant in Catawissa Township. The soil in the township consists of clay and gravel. The terrain in the township is predominantly hilly.

== Demographics ==
Historical population
Census	Pop.	Note	%±
2010	932		—
2020	904		−3.0%
2021 (est.)	908		0.4%
U.S. Decennial Census

As of the census of 2000, there were 944 people, 378 households, and 297 families residing in the township. The population density was 75.8 inhabitants per square mile (29.3/km^{2}). There were 402 housing units at an average density of 32.3 per square mile (12.5/km^{2}). The racial makeup of the township was 99.47% White, 0.42% African American, and 0.11% from two or more races.

There were 378 households, out of which 28.3% had children under the age of 18 living with them, 68.0% were married couples living together, 6.6% had a female householder with no husband present, and 21.4% were non-families. 19.0% of all households were made up of individuals, and 8.2% had someone living alone who was 65 years of age or older. The average household size was 2.50 and the average family size was 2.83.

In the township the population was spread out, with 21.2% under the age of 18, 3.6% from 18 to 24, 28.2% from 25 to 44, 31.3% from 45 to 64, and 15.8% who were 65 years of age or older. The median age was 43 years. For every 100 females, there were 100.9 males. For every 100 females age 18 and over, there were 98.9 males.

The median income for a household in the township was $44,250, and the median income for a family was $49,375. Males had a median income of $32,328 versus $26,579 for females. The per capita income for the township was $23,635. About 1.1% of families and 2.8% of the population were below the poverty line, including 2.0% of those under age 18 and 3.7% of those age 65 or over.

== Education ==
The school district of the majority of the township is Southern Columbia Area School District. A small section of it is instead in Bloomsburg Area School District.
