= Steeple Bush =

Steeple Bush is one of Robert Frost's smaller collections. This poetic collection was published in The New York Times on June 1, 1947. It is dedicated to Robert Frost's six grandchildren. There is tenderness and passive sadness in this volume. In this collection, with Spiritual Themes, Frost portrays religion in an ambiguous way.

The poems of this collection:

1. Directive
2. A Young Birch
3. Skeptic
4. Etherealizing
5. Why Wait for Science
6. Too Anxious for Rivers
7. One Step Backward Taken
