= Main Township, Columbia County, Pennsylvania =

Township in Pennsylvania, US

Coordinates: 41°01′00″N 76°21′59″W

Main Township, Pennsylvania
- Township
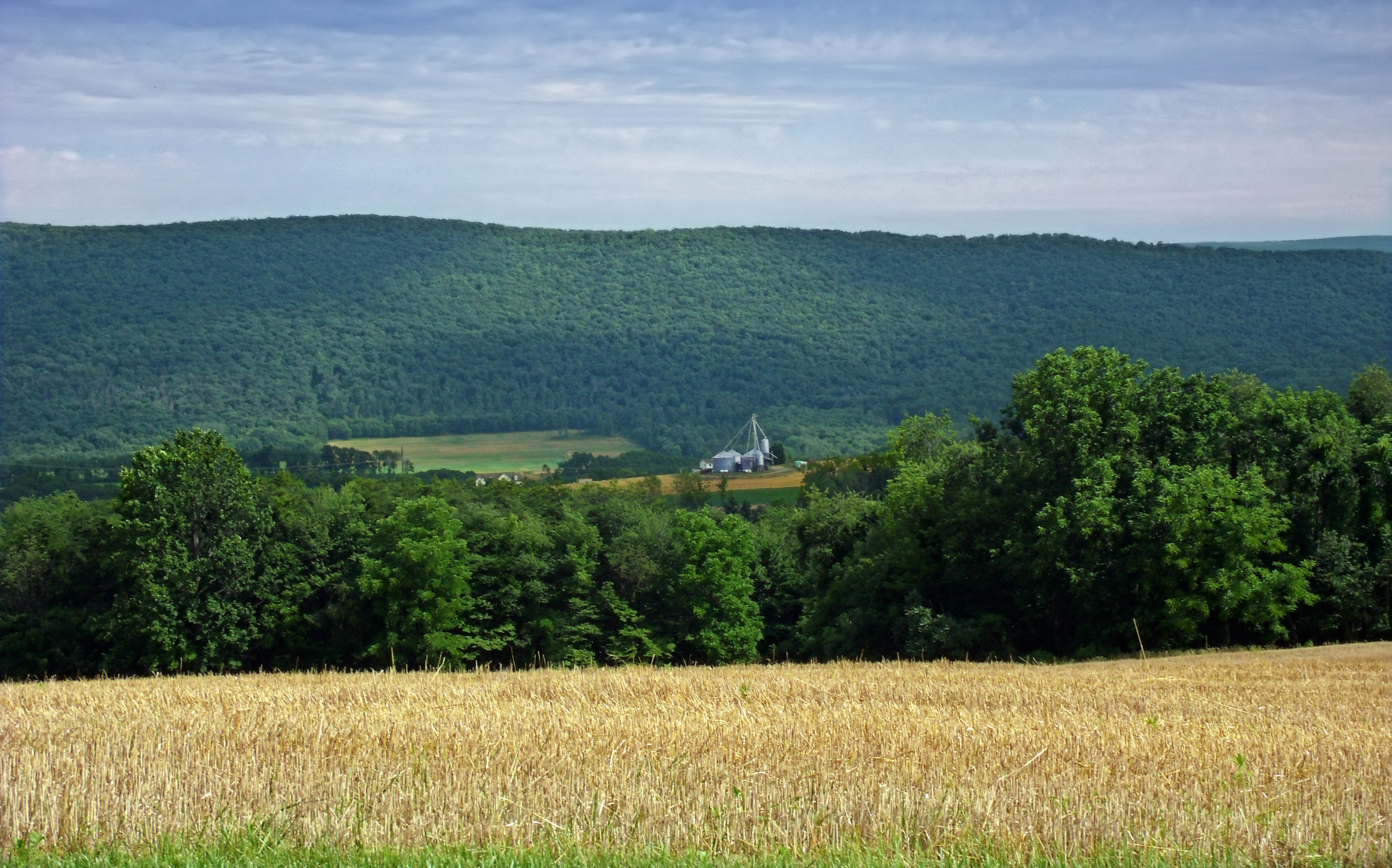
- Nescopeck Mountain in Main Township

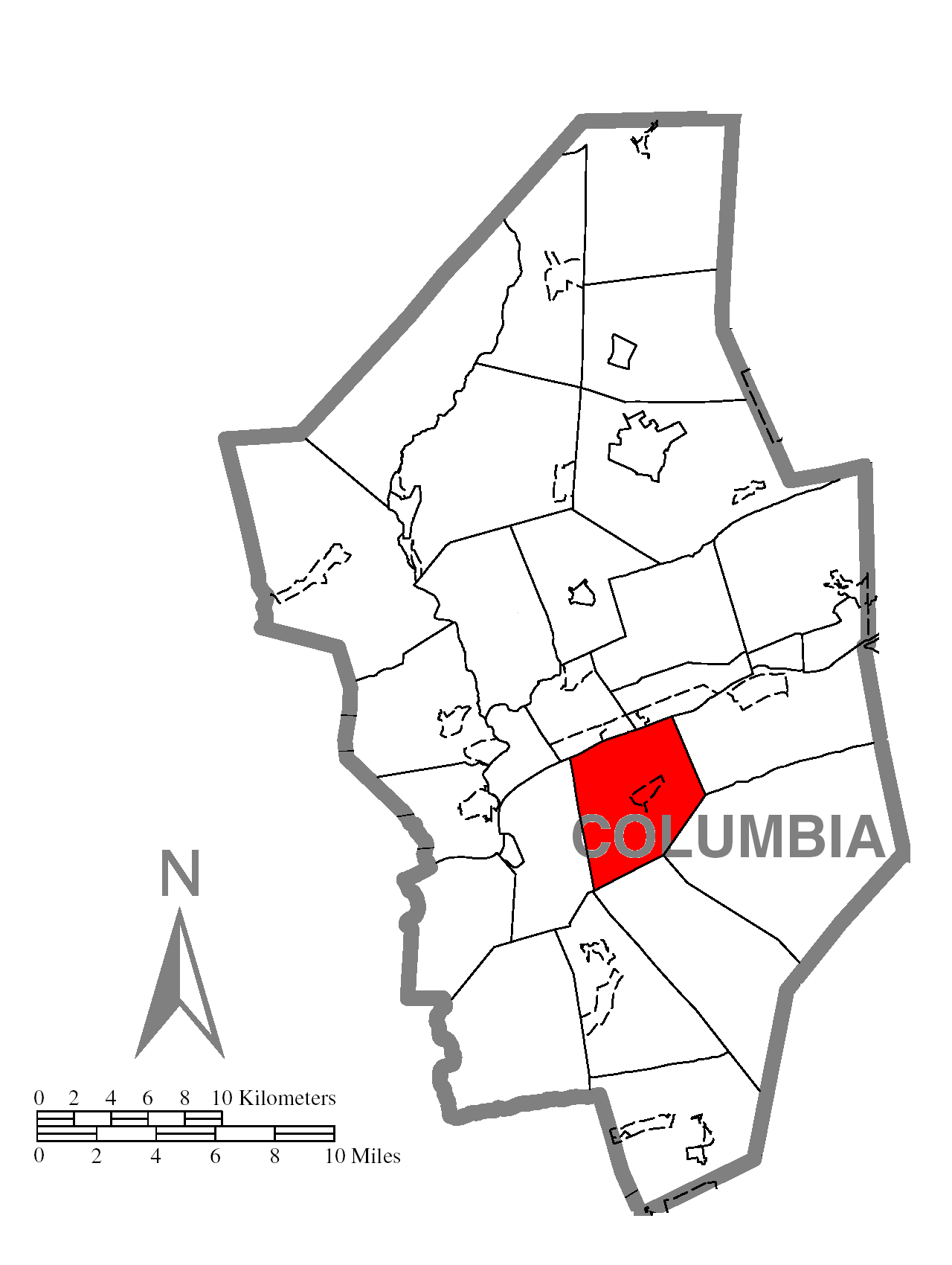
- Map of Columbia County, Pennsylvania highlighting Main Township

- Map of Columbia County, Pennsylvania
- Country: United States
- State: Pennsylvania
- County: Columbia
- Settled: 1772
- Incorporated: 1844

Area
  - Total: 16.66 sq mi (43.15 km^{2})
  - Land: 16.15 sq mi (41.82 km^{2})
  - Water: 0.51 sq mi (1.33 km^{2})

Population (2020)
  - Total: 1,272 ▲
  - Estimate (2021): 1,276
  - Density: 79.5/sq mi (30.71/km^{2})
- Time zone: UTC-5 (Eastern (EST))
  - Summer (DST): UTC-4 (EDT)
- Area code: 570
- FIPS code: 42-037-46688
- Website: maintownship.com

Main Township is a township in Columbia County, Pennsylvania. It is part of Northeastern Pennsylvania. The population was 1,272 at the 2020 census. Main Township was settled in 1772 and incorporated in 1844. The iron industry was once preeminent in the township.

== History ==
The area that is now Main Township was part of Augusta Township, then Catawissa Township until 1799, and part of Mifflin Township until January 1844. The Pennsylvania Railroad once passed through the township. In 1808, Reading Road was created and passed through Main Township, allowing easier access to it. By this time, several settlers had arrived and settled in the township.

Main Township was settled by settlers of European descent in 1772, at which time the township was part of Berks County.

The main historical industry in Main Township was the iron industry. In 1815, a charcoal-iron furnace was built in the township.

== Geography ==
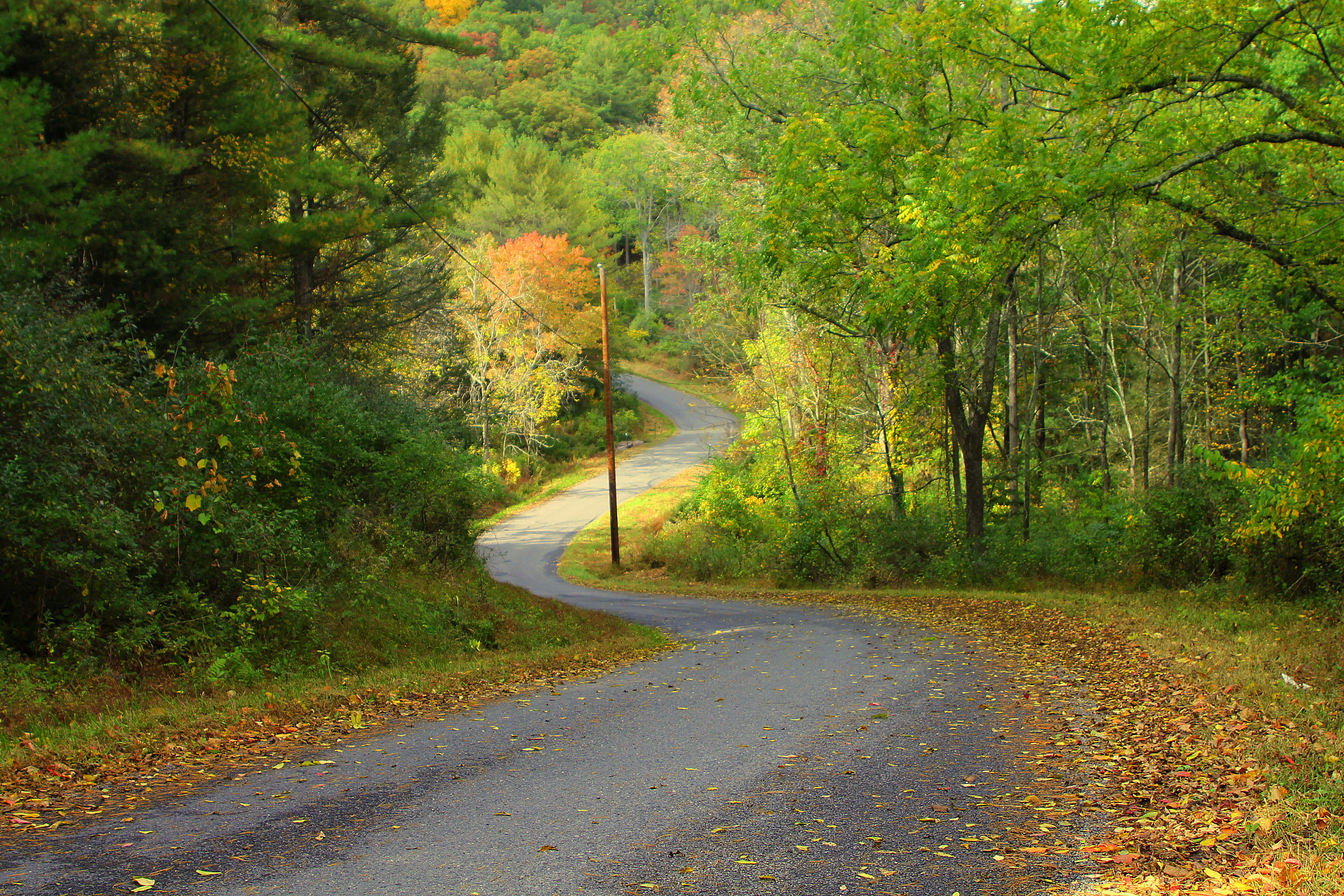
Fisher Run Road looking north in Main Township

Main Township is located just south of the center of Columbia County and is bordered to the north by the Susquehanna River, lined by 500-foot-high (150 m) bluffs. The unincorporated community of Mainville is in the center of the township. The ridges of Nescopeck Mountain and Catawissa Mountain cross the township just south of Mainville, separated by a water gap formed by Catawissa Creek.

According to the United States Census Bureau, the township has a total area of 16.6 square miles (43.1 km^{2}), of which 16.1 square miles (41.8 km^{2}) is land and 0.50 square miles (1.3 km^{2}), or 3.08%, is water.

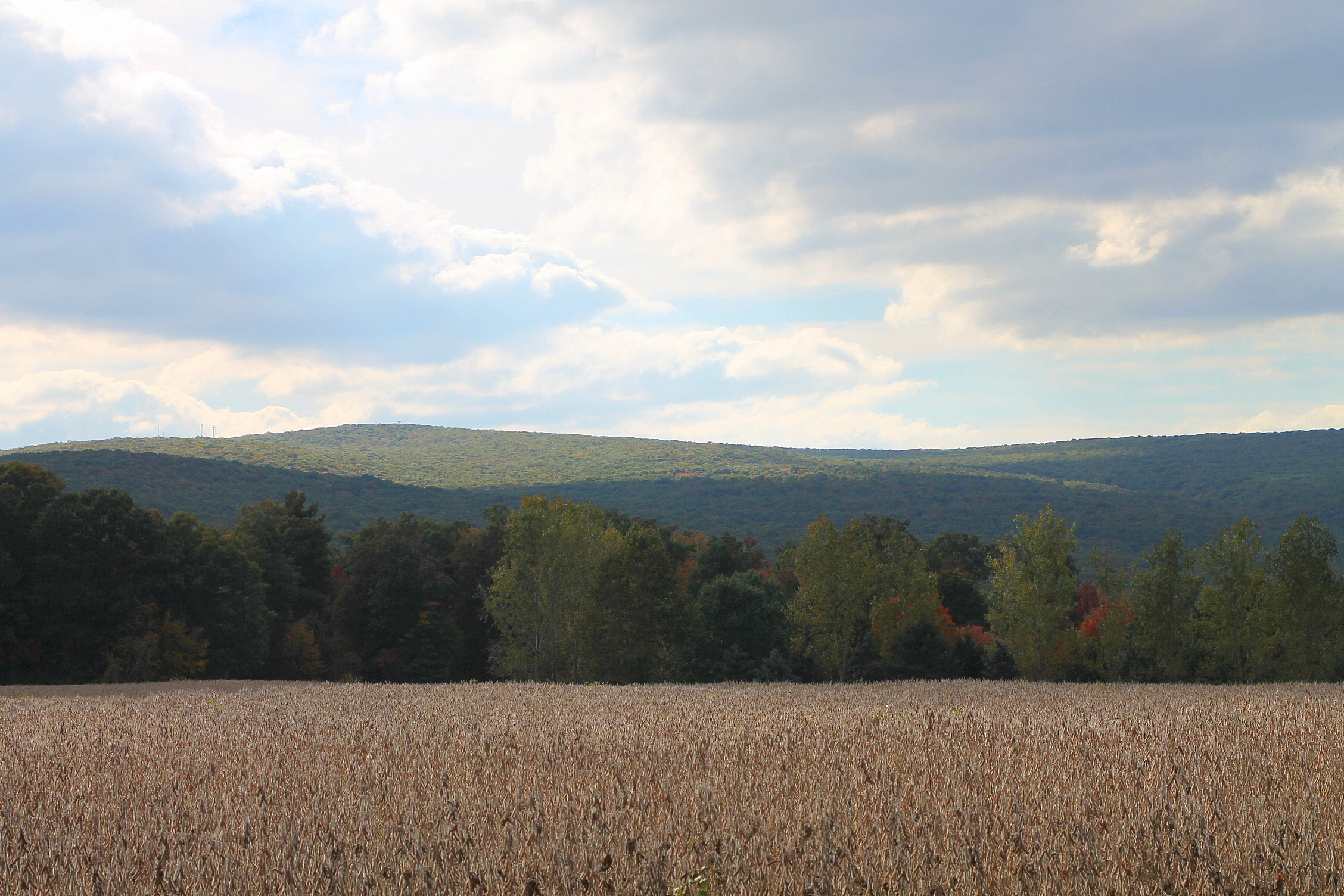
Catawissa Mountain from Fisher Run Road in Main Township

== Demographics ==
Historical population
| Census | Pop. | Note | %± |
|---|---|---|---|
| 2010 | 1,236 | | — |
| 2020 | 1,272 | | 2.9% |
| 2021 (est.) | 1,276 | | 0.3% |

As of the census of 2010, there were 1,236 people, 513 households, and families residing in the township. The population density was 79.6 inhabitants per square mile (30.7/km^{2}). There were 490 housing units at an average density of 30.2 per square mile (11.7/km^{2}). The racial makeup of the township was 98.22% White, 1.01% African American, 0.31% Asian, 0.31% Pacific Islander, 0.08% from other races, and 0.08% from two or more races. Hispanic or Latino of any race were 0.78% of the population.

There were 469 households, out of which 38.0% had children under the age of 18 living with them, 67.0% were married couples living together, 8.3% had a female householder with no husband present, and 21.1% were non-families. 17.7% of all households were made up of individuals, and 6.6% had someone living alone who was 65 years of age or older. The average household size was 2.73 and the average family size was 3.09.

In the township the population was spread out, with 27.9% under the age of 18, 8.1% from 18 to 24, 26.7% from 25 to 44, 26.9% from 45 to 64, and 10.4% who were 65 years of age or older. The median age was 38 years. For every 100 females, there were 101.7 males. For every 100 females age 18 and over, there were 95.8 males.

The median income for a household in the township was $41,339, and the median income for a family was $47,574. Males had a median income of $32,069 versus $21,250 for females. The per capita income for the township was $19,357. About 6.9% of families and 7.8% of the population were below the poverty line, including 6.1% of those under age 18 and 7.7% of those age 65 or over.

== Education ==
Before Main Township was separated from Catawissa Township, children in Main Township went to a school in western Catawissa Township. In 1820, Jacob Gensel opened a school in a carding mill on Scotch Run. In 1824, another school was opened in the township, this time near a church. By 1886, there were five teachers in the township. By 1915, there were 114 students and six schools in Main Township. The Township is now part of the Bloomsburg Area School District.
