= Mauch Chunk Formation =

Mapped bedrock unit

- Stratigraphic range: Mississippian
- Type: Formation
- Underlies: Pottsville Formation
- Overlies: Pocono Formation

Location
- Region: Maryland, Pennsylvania, West Virginia,
- Country: United States

The Mississippian Mauch Chunk Formation is a mapped bedrock unit in Pennsylvania, Maryland, and West Virginia. It is named for the township of Mauch Chunk, now known as borough of Jim Thorpe, Pennsylvania and for nearby Mauch Chunk Ridge where the formation crops out.

== Description ==
The Mauch Chunk is defined as a grayish-red shale, siltstone, sandstone, and conglomerate. The Loyalhanna Member is a local limestone and sandy limestone at its base, as well as the Greenbrier and Wymps Gap Members. Along the Allegheny Front, the Loyalhanna is a greenish-gray, calcareous, cross bedded sandstone.

A notable exposure of the Loyalhanna Member is Laurel Caverns in Fayette County.

=== Depositional environment ===
The early Mauch Chunk beds were deposited on a large basin receiving most of its sediments from distant highlands. Sea levels fluctuated and allowed some limestone deposition to occur early as well. Since the dominant color of the Mauch Chunk is red, much of the sediment was deposited above sea level in oxidizing conditions. The green-colored members indicate a reducing environment characterized by frequent inundation by water in a swamp, delta, or shallow sea. Later beds have frequent conglomerate beds signaling the first wave of the Alleghenian orogeny.

=== Fossils ===
Plants from the division Pteridospermatophyta notably Adiantites have been identified. Some fish and worm burrows have also been observed.

== Age ==
Relative age dating of the Mauch Chunk places it in the late Mississippian epoch, with some of the top layers in the early Pennsylvanian epoch, being deposited between 345 and 320(±3) million years ago. It rests conformably atop many formations. Its upper contact is complex. In certain areas, the contact is conformable in others, there is an unconformity. However, the Pottsville Formation is always above the Mauch Chunk.

== Economic uses ==
In 1953, a small amount of uranium was mined from the Mauch Chunk Formation near Jim Thorpe. (see Uranium mining in the United States)

== See also ==
- Ridge-and-Valley Appalachians
- Geology of Pennsylvania
- Canaan Valley
