= Roaring Creek Township, Pennsylvania =

Township in Pennsylvania, US

Coordinates: 40°55′00″N 76°22′35″W

- Township
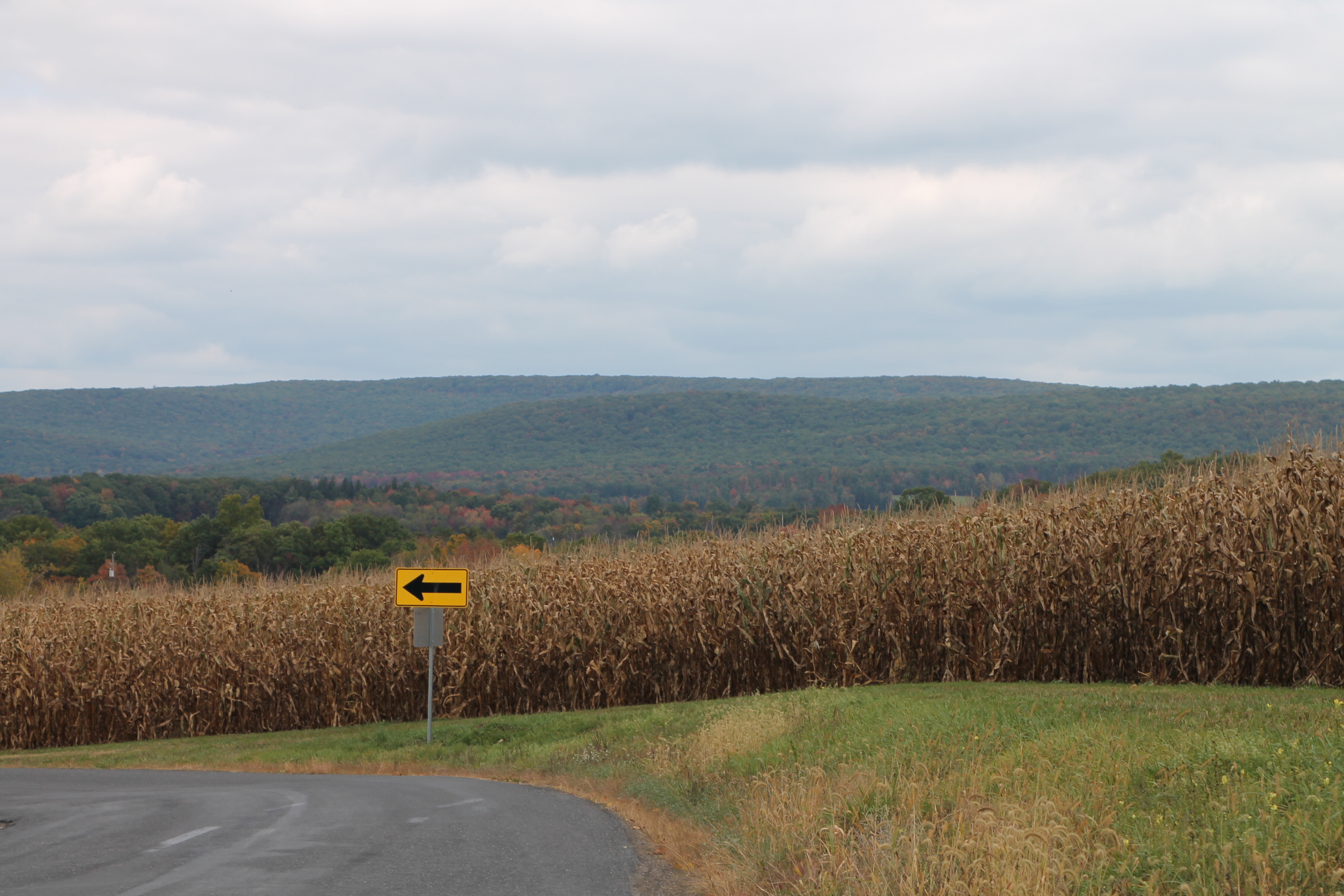
- Catawissa Mountain in Roaring Creek Township

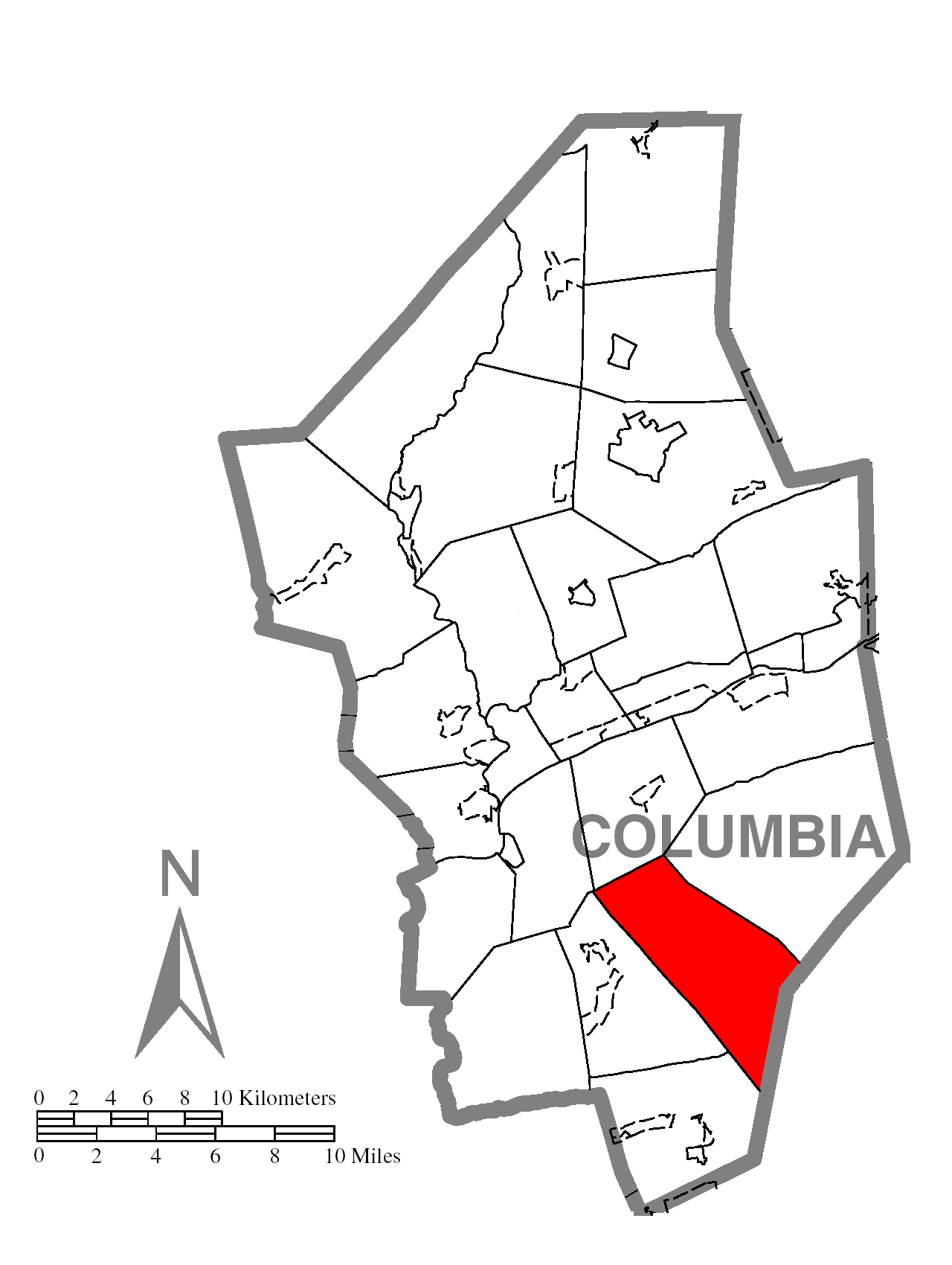
- Map of Columbia County, Pennsylvania highlighting Roaring Creek Township

- Map of Columbia County, Pennsylvania
- Country: United States
- State: Pennsylvania
- County: Columbia
- Settled: 1774
- Incorporated: 1832

Area
  - Total: 23.54 sq mi (60.97 km^{2})
  - Land: 23.46 sq mi (60.76 km^{2})
  - Water: 0.081 sq mi (0.21 km^{2})

Population (2010)
  - Total: 545
  - Estimate (2016): 537
  - Density: 22.9/sq mi (8.84/km^{2})
- Time zone: UTC-5 (Eastern (EST))
  - Summer (DST): UTC-4 (EDT)
- Area code: 570
- FIPS code: 42-037-65240

Roaring Creek Township is a township in Columbia County, Pennsylvania. It is part of Northeastern Pennsylvania. The population was five hundred and forty-five at the time of the 2010 census.

The township office is located at 666 Bear Gap Road, Elysburg, Pennsylvania, outside the township.

== History ==
In 1974, county officials determined that "the low population density of the [Southern Columbia] Region offer[ed] no immediate demand for public sewerage."

== Geography ==
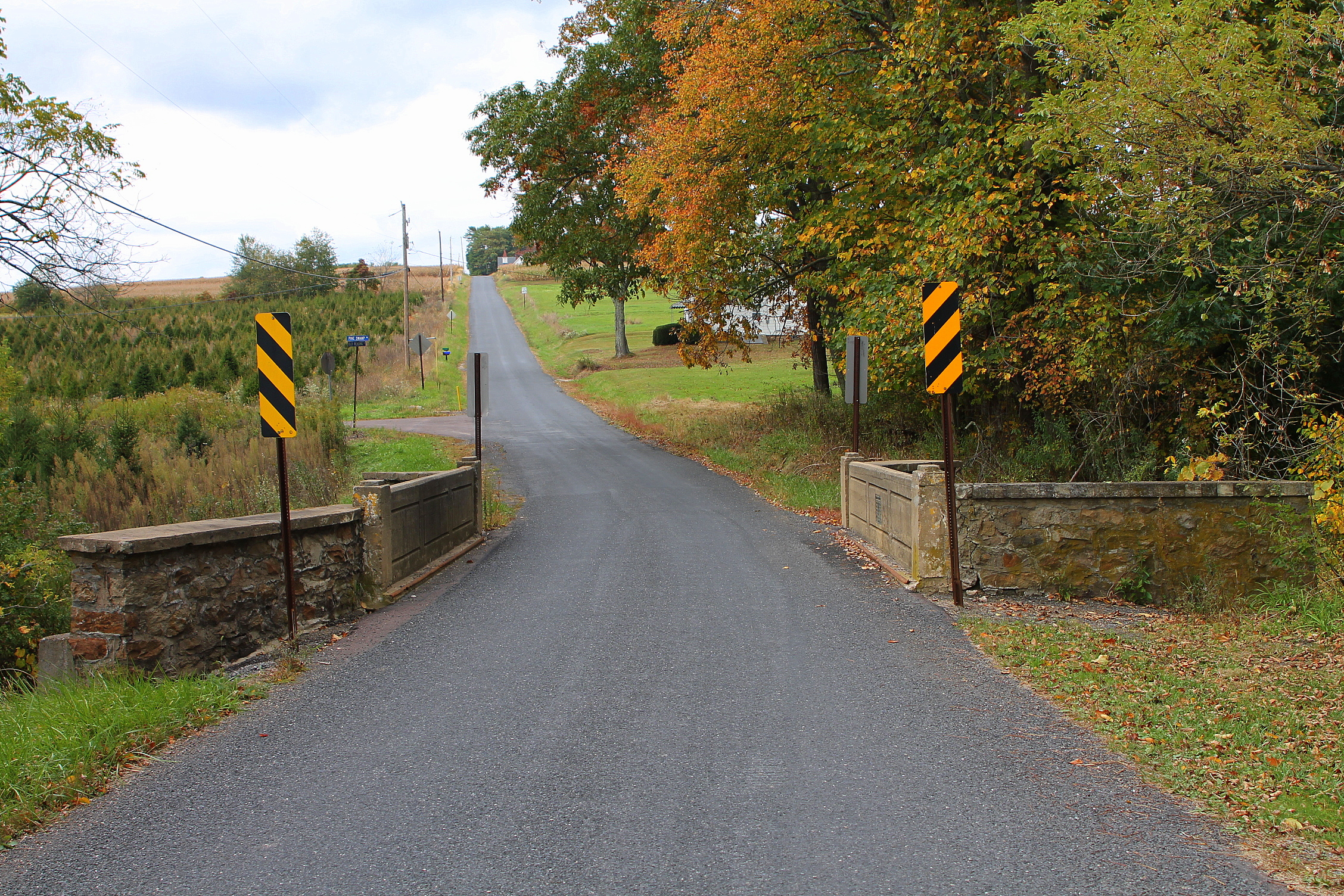
Old Reading Road in Roaring Creek Township

The township is in southern Columbia County and is bordered to the southeast by Schuylkill County. The broad ridgecrest of Catawissa Mountain runs along the northeastern side of the township, then bends to the west and becomes Little Mountain, crossing the southern end of the township.

The western and central parts of the township are within the eastern end of the valley of Roaring Creek, which flows northwest towards the Susquehanna River. The unincorporated community of Mill Grove is along the southwest boundary of the township, next to Roaring Creek.

According to the U.S. Bureau, the township has a total area of 23.6 square miles (61.0 km^{2}), of which 23.5 square miles (60.8 km^{2}) is land and 0.1 square miles (0.2 km^{2}), or 0.34%, is water.

== Demographics ==
Historical population
Census	Pop.	Note	%±
2010	545		—
2016 (est.)	537		−1.5%
U.S. Decennial Census

As of the census of 2000, there were four hundred and ninety-five people, one hundred and ninety-eight households, and one hundred and forty-nine families residing in the township.

The population density was 21.1 people per square mile (8.1 people/km^{2}). There were two hundred and seventy-nine housing units at an average density of 11.9 units per square mile (4.6 units/km^{2}).

The racial makeup of the township was 99.39% White, 0.40% Asian, and 0.20% from two or more races.

There were one hundred and ninety-eight households, out of which 29.3% had children under the age of eighteen living with them; 66.7% were married couples living together, 5.6% had a female householder with no husband present, and 24.7% were non-families. 22.7% of all households were made up of individuals, and 14.1% had someone living alone who was sixty-five years of age or older.

The average household size was 2.50 and the average family size was 2.92.

In the township the population was spread out, with 21.0% under the age of eighteen, 6.5% from eighteen to twenty-four, 25.1% from twenty-five to forty-four, 29.7% from forty-five to sixty-four, and 17.8% who were sixty-five years of age or older. The median age was forty-three years.

For every one hundred females, there were 98.0 males. For every one hundred females aged eighteen and over, there were 98.5 males.

The median income for a household in the township was $40,625, and the median income for a family was $43,125. Males had a median income of $35,795 versus $22,250 for females. The per capita income for the township was $21,725.

Roughly 8.7% of families and 9.7% of the population were below the poverty line, including 20.4% of those under age 18 and none of those age 65 or over.
