= East Berwick, Pennsylvania =

Unincorporated community in Pennsylvania, US

- Census-designated place
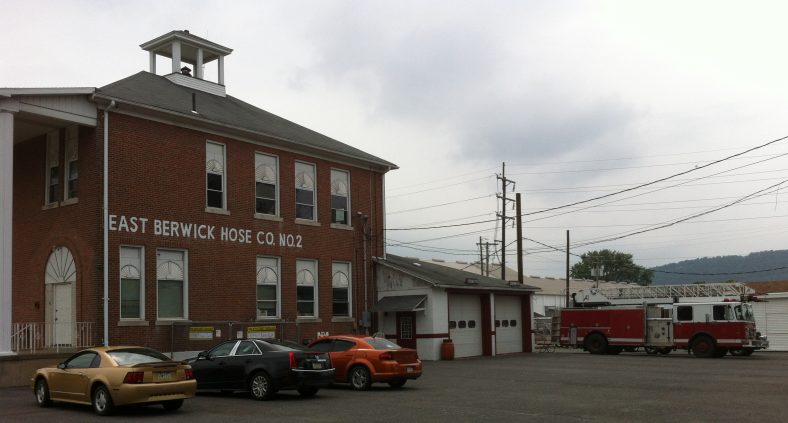
- The fire hall of the East Berwick Fire Company

- Location in Pennsylvania Location in the United States
- Coordinates: 41°3′46″N 76°13′28″W
- Country: United States
- State: Pennsylvania
- County: Luzerne
- Township: Salem

Area
  - Total: 1.00 sq mi (2.59 km^{2})
  - Land: 0.91 sq mi (2.36 km^{2})
  - Water: 0.093 sq mi (0.24 km^{2})

Population (2020)
  - Total: 2,042
  - Density: 2,245.3/sq mi (866.91/km^{2})
- Time zone: UTC-5 (Eastern (EST))
  - Summer (DST): UTC-4 (EDT)
- ZIP code: 18603
- Area code: 570
- FIPS code: 42-20800

East Berwick is a census-designated place (CDP) in Salem Township, Luzerne County, Pennsylvania, United States. The population was 2,007 at the 2010 census.

== History ==
Following the initial settlement of the broader region by Evan Owen in 1786, East Berwick experienced significant development during the late 19th century. This growth was largely driven by the industrial expansion of the American Car and Foundry Company (ACF), as the thousands of workers employed by the plant increasingly established residences in East Berwick.

== Geography ==
East Berwick is located along the Susquehanna River at 41°3′46″N 76°13′28″W (41.062789, -76.224529). East Berwick borders Berwick Borough, which is in neighboring Columbia County. The CDP is also adjacent to Nescopeck Borough, which is on the opposite bank of the Susquehanna River.

According to the United States Census Bureau, the CDP has a total area of 1.0 square mile (2.6 km^{2}), of which 0.9 square miles (2.3 km^{2}) is land and 0.1 square miles (0.26 km^{2}), or 13.13%, is water.

=== Townscape ===
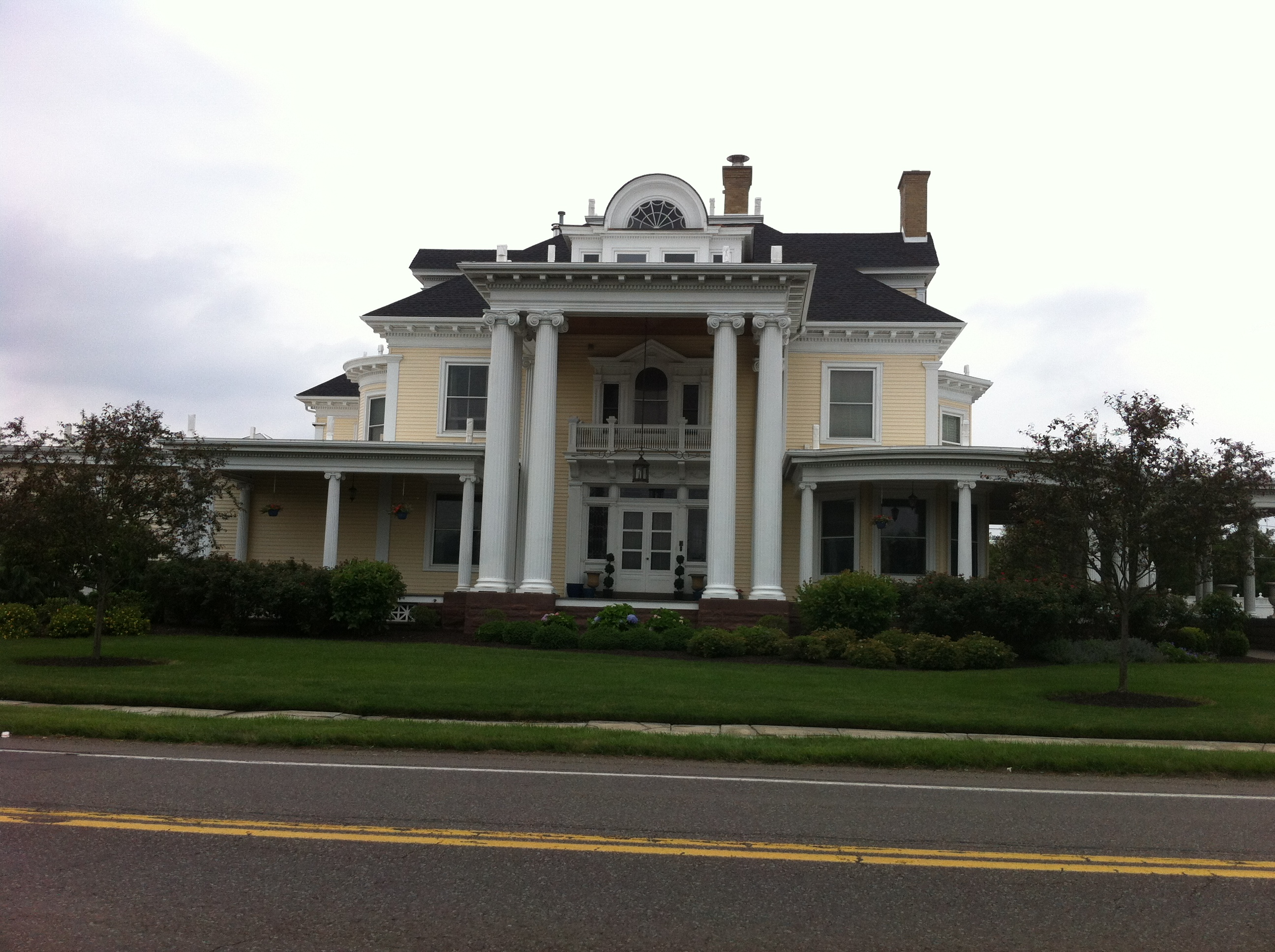
Crispin Mansion in East Berwick

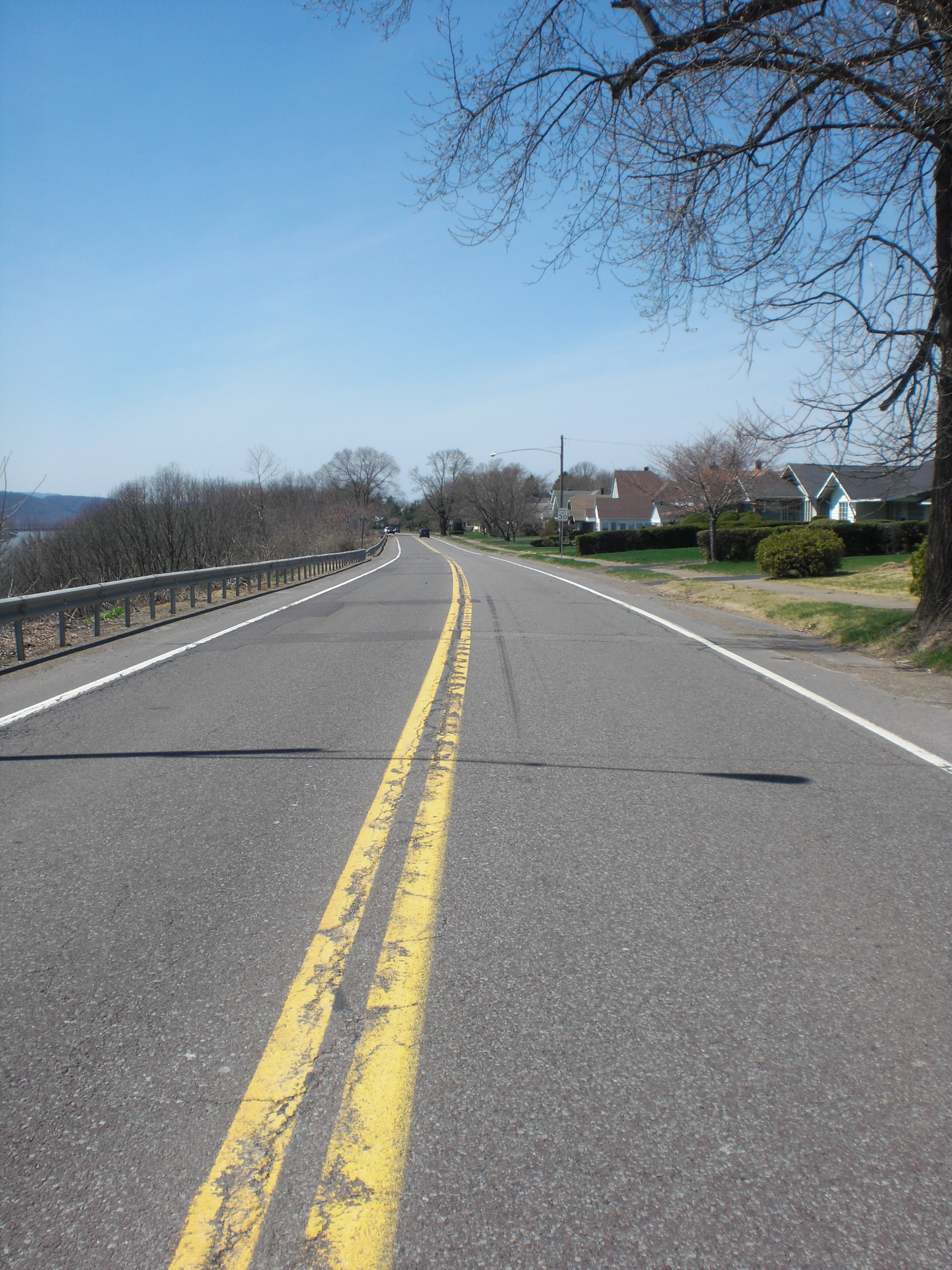
East Front Street in East Berwick

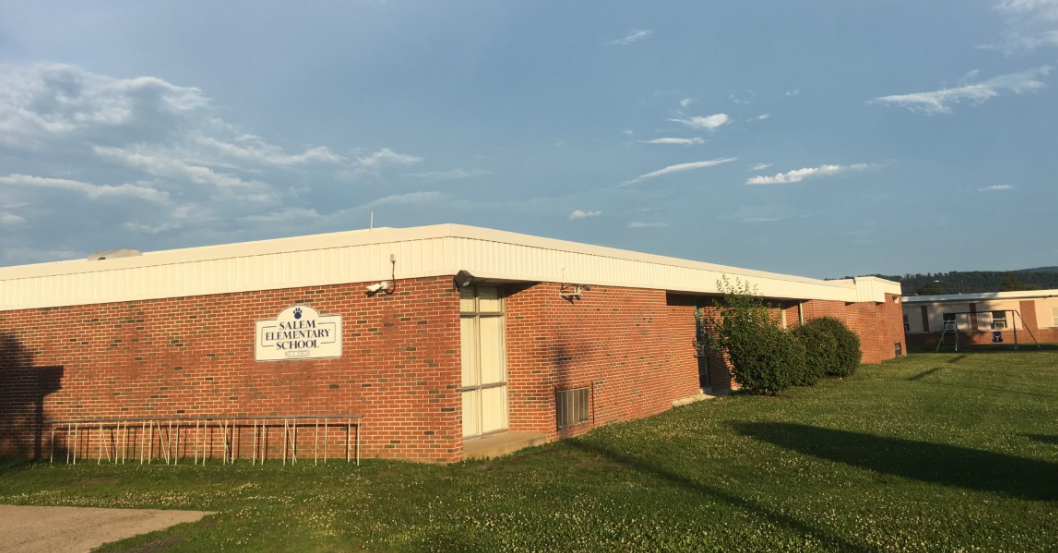
Salem Elementary School

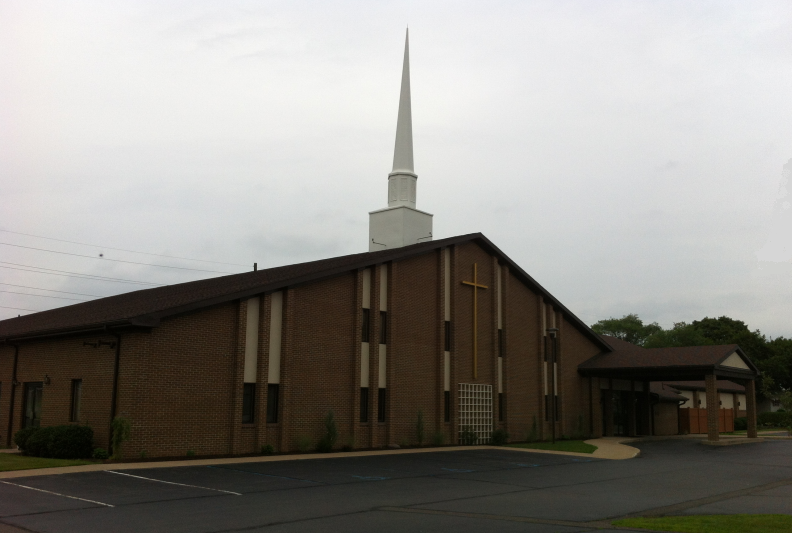
Berwick Assembly of God Church (in East Berwick)

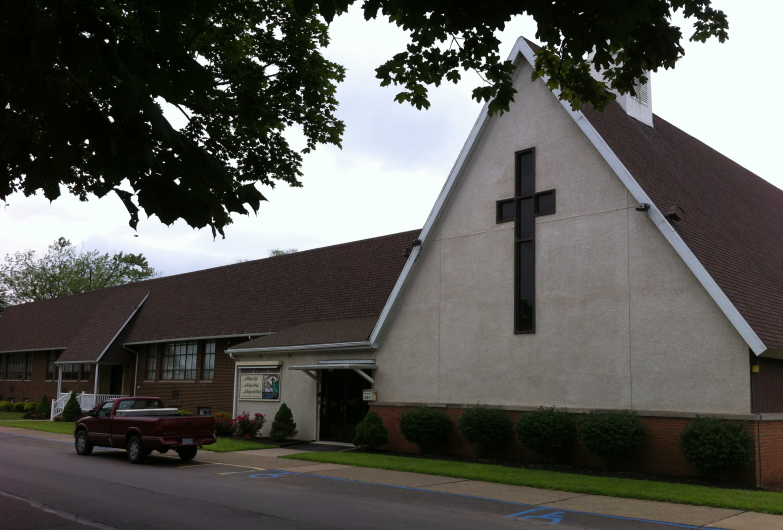
Berwick Christian Church (in East Berwick)

== Demographics ==
Historical population
Census	Pop.	Note	%±
2000	1,998		—
2010	2,007		0.5%
2020	2,042		1.7%
U.S. Decennial Census

At the 2000 census there were 1,998 people, 846 households, and 611 families living in the CDP. The population density was 2,308.0 inhabitants per square mile (891.1/km^{2}). There were 878 housing units at an average density of 1,014.2 per square mile (391.6/km^{2}). The racial makeup of the CDP was 98.25% White, 0.60% African American, 0.50% Asian, 0.20% from other races, and 0.45% from two or more races. Hispanic or Latino of any race were 0.85%.

There were 846 households, 26.0% had children under the age of 18 living with them, 60.4% were married couples living together, 9.0% had a female householder with no husband present, and 27.7% were non-families. 25.2% of households were made up of individuals, and 15.5% were one person aged 65 or older. The average household size was 2.36 and the average family size was 2.79.

The age distribution was 20.4% under the age of 18, 6.1% from 18 to 24, 23.5% from 25 to 44, 25.8% from 45 to 64, and 24.1% 65 or older. The median age was 45 years. For every 100 females, there were 91.0 males. For every 100 females age 18 and over, there were 87.3 males.

The median household income was $40,489 and the median family income was $46,458. Males had a median income of $30,887 versus $27,813 for females. The per capita income for the CDP was $19,531. About 4.3% of families and 5.4% of the population were below the poverty line, including 15.8% of those under age 18 and 1.9% of those age 65 or over.

== Education ==
The school district is Berwick Area School District.
