= George Curry (American football) =

American football coach (1944–2016)

- Born: November 29, 1944; Luzerne County, Pennsylvania, U.S.
- Died: April 1, 2016 (aged 71); Berwick, Pennsylvania, U.S.
- Occupation: Football coach
- Known for: Named twice as the USA Today High School Coach of the Year

George Curry (November 29, 1944 – April 1, 2016) was an American football coach, who was named twice as the USA Today High School Coach of the Year.

== Biography ==
Curry coached high school football for 46 years, during which time he amassed 455 victories with six Pennsylvania Interscholastic Athletic Association Class 3A championships. All of his state championships came during a stretch in the 1980s and 1990s, as part of a 39-year stint at Berwick Area High School in Berwick, Pennsylvania.

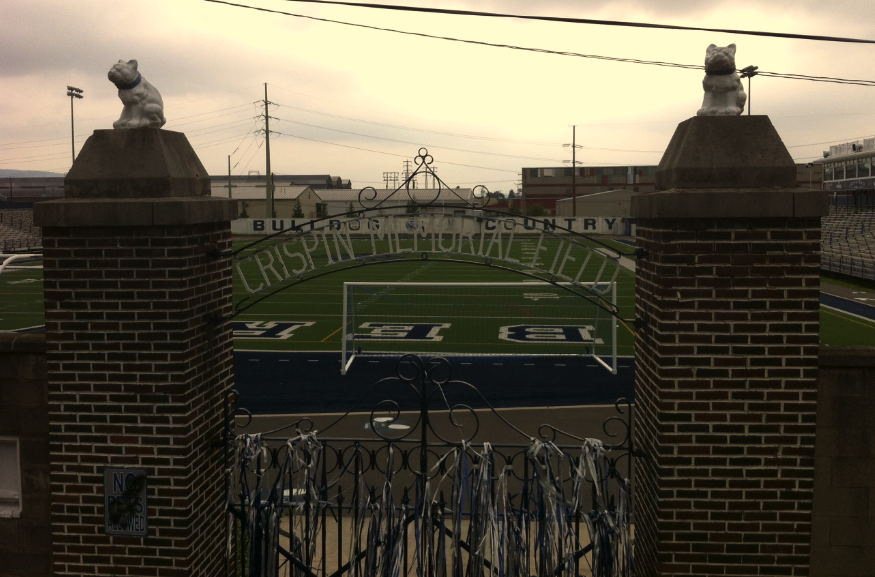
Crispin Field, where Curry's Bulldogs played

Curry embarked on his high school head coaching career in 1967, achieving a commendable winning record over four years at Lake-Lehman School District within the Wyoming Valley Conference. Subsequently, he transitioned to Berwick Area in 1971, where he remained until his departure as head coach in 2005.

During his time at Berwick, Curry won three national championships, and was twice named as the USA Today High School Coach of the Year.

He subsequently spent three seasons at Wyoming Valley West High School, and then retired in December 2008.

On June 11, 2012, local media (WNEP, WBRE and the Times-Leader) reported that Curry had been rehired to coach the Berwick Bulldogs on an interim basis, beginning with the fall 2012 season.

== Death ==
Curry died on April 1, 2016, of ALS, which he had been diagnosed with the year prior.
