= Berwick, Pennsylvania =

Borough in Pennsylvania, US

- Borough
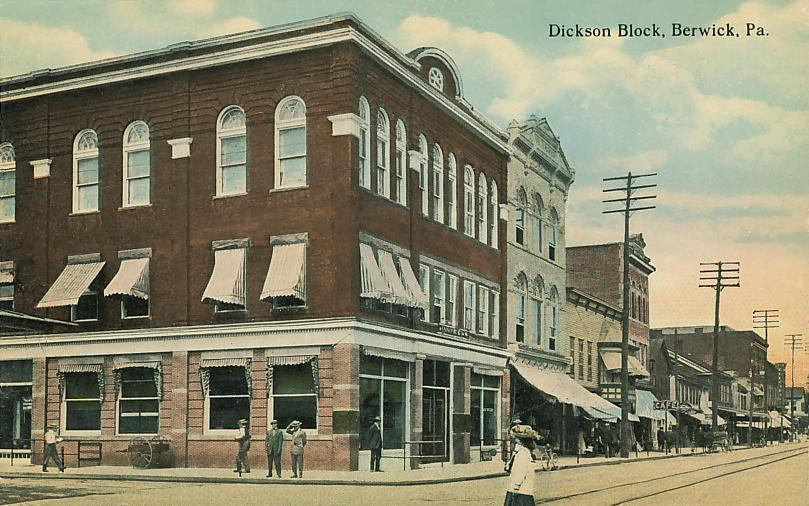
- Dickson Block in 1912
- Motto: "Proud of Our Heritage"
- Location of Berwick in Columbia County, Pennsylvania

- Location of Columbia County in Pennsylvania

- Location of Berwick in Pennsylvania Berwick (the United States)
- Coordinates: 41°03′17″N 76°14′01″W
- Country: United States
- State: Pennsylvania
- County: Columbia
- Settled: 1769
- Incorporated: 1818

Government
  - Type: Borough Council
  - Mayor: Tim Burke
  - Council President: Teresa Troiani
  - Borough Manager: Damien Scoblink
  - Fire Chief: Gene Boone
  - Police Chief: Kenneth Strish

Area
  - Total: 3.25 sq mi (8.42 km^{2})
  - Land: 3.07 sq mi (7.96 km^{2})
  - Water: 0.18 sq mi (0.46 km^{2})
- Elevation: 560 ft (170 m)

Population (2020)
  - Total: 10,327
  - Density: 3,359.7/sq mi (1,297.17/km^{2})
- Time zone: UTC−5 (Eastern (EST))
  - Summer (DST): UTC−4 (EDT)
- ZIP Code: 18603
- Area codes: 570 and 272
- FIPS code: 42-05888
- Website: www.berwickborough.org

Berwick is a borough in Columbia County, Pennsylvania, United States. The municipality is situated on the border of Luzerne County. The county line bisects the urban area, separating the Borough of Berwick in Columbia County from East Berwick in Luzerne County.

Berwick is part of Northeastern Pennsylvania and is located 28 miles (45 km) southwest of Wilkes-Barre. In the 2020 census, Berwick had a population of 10,355. It is one of the two principal communities of the Bloomsburg–Berwick metropolitan area, which covers Columbia and Montour counties, and had a combined population of 85,562 at the 2010 census.

== History ==
Berwick was founded by Evan Owen, a Welsh Quaker and surveyor. He was the son of Hugh Owen from Trefeglwys, Montgomeryshire, Wales. Berwick was named after Berwick-upon-Tweed, England. Situated on the north bank of the Susquehanna River, the borough was first settled in 1769, founded in 1786, and incorporated in 1818.

Light and heavy manufacturing industries, such as American Car and Foundry Company and Wise Potato Chips, were established in Berwick, which consolidated with the borough of West Berwick in 1917. The population of Berwick in 1910 was 5,357. In 1920, after consolidation, the population was 12,181. In 1950, the population peaked at 14,010. The population was 10,477 at the 2010 census.

Berwick is famous for its high school football team, the Bulldogs, who are six time state champions and three time national champions. Berwick is also the home of the 2008 PIAA AAA baseball state champions. It is the school's first ever baseball state championship.

Since 1947, the Berwick Christmas Boulevard, created by the Jaycees, displays over a mile long Christmas show of lights and displays down Market Street. The Berwick Christmas Boulevard is seen by thousands of visitors every year, and it has been a regional favorite for over 60 years. Santa Claus is present every year to serve Berwick's famous Wise Potato Chips to everyone who drives past him.

The Berwick Armory and Jackson Mansion and Carriage House are listed on the National Register of Historic Places.

== Geography ==
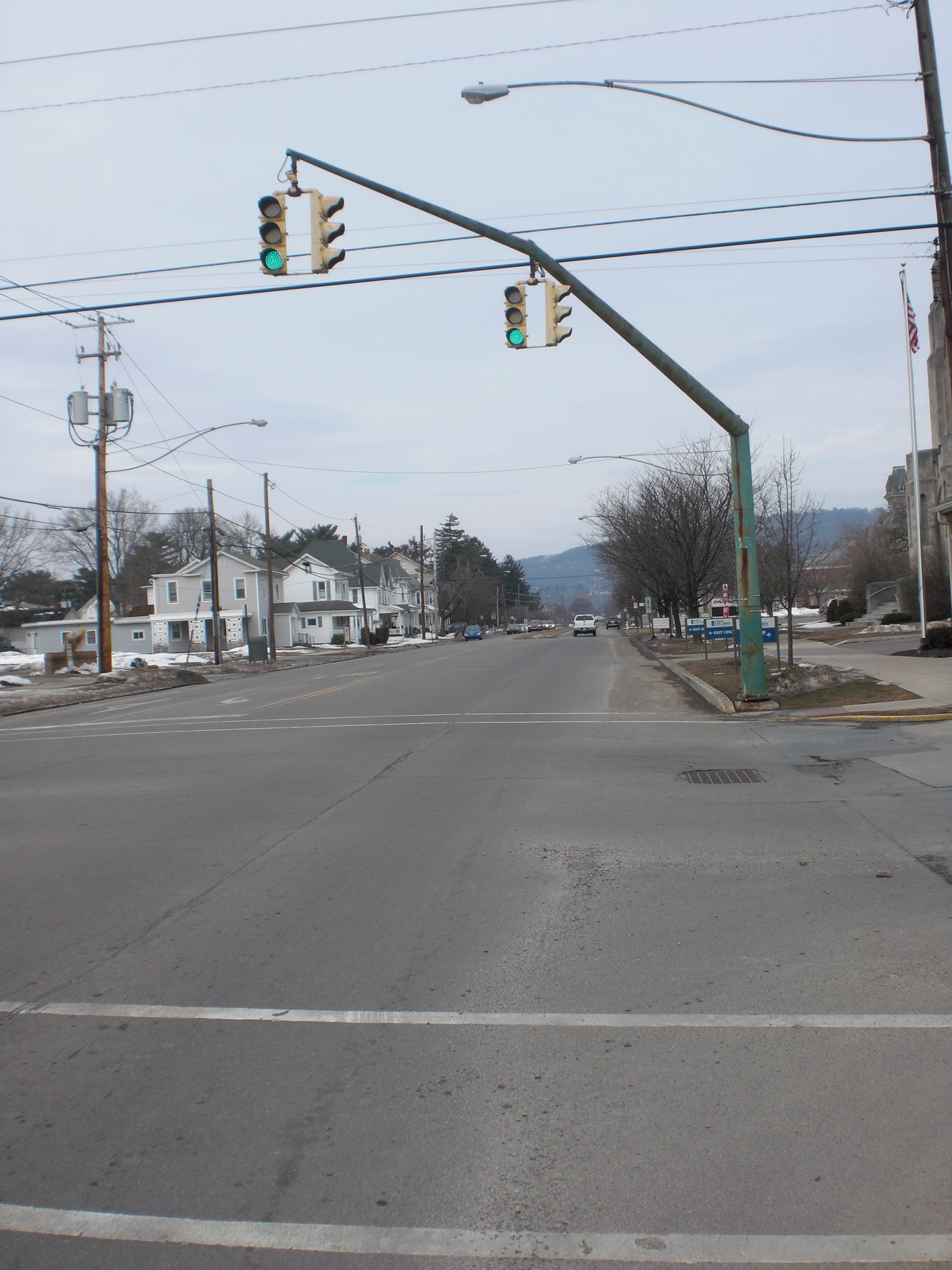
Market Street looking north

Berwick is located in eastern Columbia County, bordered to the north by Briar Creek Township, to the west by Briar Creek borough, to the south across the Susquehanna River by Mifflin Township, and to the east by Salem Township in Luzerne County. The borough of Nescopeck in Luzerne County is to the southeast, across the Susquehanna. The Borough of Berwick and East Berwick (in Salem Township) are separated by the Luzerne County border, which passes right through the townscape.

According to the United States Census Bureau, Berwick has a total area of 3.25 square miles (8.43 km^{2}), of which 3.08 square miles (7.97 km^{2}) is land and 0.18 square miles (0.46 km^{2}), or 5.45%, is water.

U.S. Route 11 runs through the center of Berwick as Front Street (one-way northeast) and Second Street (one-way southwest). US 11 leads northeast 26 miles (42 km) to Kingston, across the Susquehanna from Wilkes-Barre, and southwest 12 miles (19 km) to Bloomsburg, the Columbia County seat. Pennsylvania Route 93 shares Front and Second Streets with US 11 in the center of Berwick, but turns south to cross the Susquehanna via the Market Street Bridge to Nescopeck. In the other direction, PA 93 splits west from US 11 as Orange Street and leads 10 miles (16 km) to Orangeville.

Interstate 80 passes south of Berwick, with the closest exits being at US 11, 6 miles (10 km) southwest of town, and at PA 93, 9 miles (14 km) southeast of town.

The eastern terminus of the Susquehanna, Bloomsburg, and Berwick Railroad was formerly in Berwick. The Pennsylvania Canal (North Branch Division) formerly went along the Susquehanna River at Berwick, where there was a lock that raised or lowered canal boats 8.48 feet (2.58 meters).

=== Greater Berwick ===
"Greater Berwick" refers to the borough of Berwick and its surrounding communities across Columbia and Luzerne counties. Historically and geographically, the area is defined by its location along the Susquehanna River and is centered around the industrial and commercial hub of Berwick Borough.

The boundaries of the "Greater Berwick" region are frequently defined by the Berwick Area School District, which provides educational services to seven distinct municipalities across two counties. In Columbia County, the district encompasses Berwick Borough, Briar Creek Borough, and Briar Creek Township. It also extends into Luzerne County, serving students from Nescopeck Borough, Nescopeck Township, Salem Township, and Hollenback Township.

== Climate ==
The Köppen Climate Classification subtype for this climate is "Dfb" (Warm Summer Continental Climate).

Climate data for Berwick, Pennsylvania
Month	Jan	Feb	Mar	Apr	May	Jun	Jul	Aug	Sep	Oct	Nov	Dec	Year
Mean daily maximum °C (°F)	2 (36)	4 (39)	9 (48)	17 (62)	23 (73)	28 (82)	30 (86)	29 (84)	24 (76)	19 (66)	11 (51)	4 (39)	17 (62)
Mean daily minimum °C (°F)	−7 (19)	−7 (20)	−2 (28)	3 (37)	9 (48)	14 (57)	16 (61)	16 (60)	12 (53)	5 (41)	1 (33)	−5 (23)	4 (40)
Average precipitation mm (inches)	58 (2.3)	58 (2.3)	69 (2.7)	86 (3.4)	100 (4)	91 (3.6)	100 (4.1)	100 (4)	91 (3.6)	71 (2.8)	81 (3.2)	74 (2.9)	990 (39)
Source: Weatherbase

== Demographics ==
Historical population
Census	Pop.	Note	%±
1820	317		—
1840	452		—
1850	486		7.5%
1860	487		0.2%
1870	923		89.5%
1880	2,095		127.0%
1890	2,701		28.9%
1900	3,916		45.0%
1910	5,357		36.8%
1920	12,181		127.4%
1930	12,660		3.9%
1940	13,181		4.1%
1950	14,010		6.3%
1960	13,353		−4.7%
1970	12,274		−8.1%
1980	11,850		−3.5%
1990	10,976		−7.4%
2000	10,774		−1.8%
2010	10,477		−2.8%
2020	10,327		−1.4%
2021 (est.)	10,349	▲	0.2%

=== 2020 census ===
As of the 2020 census, Berwick had a population of 10,327. The median age was 41.1 years. 21.0% of residents were under the age of 18 and 19.2% of residents were 65 years of age or older. For every 100 females there were 93.3 males, and for every 100 females age 18 and over there were 91.2 males age 18 and over.

100.0% of residents lived in urban areas, while 0.0% lived in rural areas.

There were 4,458 households in Berwick, of which 25.5% had children under the age of 18 living in them. Of all households, 36.2% were married-couple households, 21.7% were households with a male householder and no spouse or partner present, and 31.4% were households with a female householder and no spouse or partner present. About 35.4% of all households were made up of individuals and 16.8% had someone living alone who was 65 years of age or older.

There were 4,902 housing units, of which 9.1% were vacant. The homeowner vacancy rate was 2.3% and the rental vacancy rate was 7.0%.

Racial composition as of the 2020 census
Race	Number	Percent
White	9,033	87.5%
Black or African American	256	2.5%
American Indian and Alaska Native	26	0.3%
Asian	52	0.5%
Native Hawaiian and Other Pacific Islander	2	0.0%
Some other race	382	3.7%
Two or more races	576	5.6%
Hispanic or Latino (of any race)	712	6.9%

=== 2000 census ===
As of the 2000 census, there were 10,774 people, 4,595 households, and 2,802 families residing in the borough. The population density was 3,477.0 inhabitants per square mile (1,342.5/km^{2}). There were 4,992 housing units at an average density of 1,611.0 per square mile (622.0/km^{2}). The racial makeup of the borough was 97.10% White, 0.88% African American, 0.28% Native American, 0.43% Asian, 0.05% Pacific Islander, 0.61% from other races, and 0.65% from two or more races. Hispanic or Latino of any race were 1.62% of the population.

In 2000, there were 4,595 households, out of which 26.4% had children under the age of 18 living with them, 43.8% were married couples living together, 12.3% had a female householder with no husband present, and 39.0% were non-families. 33.6% of all households were made up of individuals, and 17.0% had someone living alone who was 65 years of age or older. The average household size was 2.28 and the average family size was 2.90.

In the borough, 23.1% of the population were under the age of 18, 7.7% from 18 to 24, 27.1% from 25 to 44, 21.5% from 45 to 64, and 20.7% who were 65 years of age or older. The median age was 40 years. For every 100 females, there were 87.8 males. For every 100 females age 18 and over, there were 84.6 males.

In 2000, the median income for a household in the borough was $27,442, and the median income for a family was $32,357. Males had a median income of $26,467 versus $21,061 for females. The per capita income for the borough was $14,538. About 9.6% of families and 14.9% of the population were below the poverty line, including 20.8% of those under age 18 and 11.1% of those age 65 or over.

=== Historical immigration ===
The Berwick area had a large influx of immigrants approximately between 1890 and 1920, which had a great impact on the current population that continues to this day. These immigrants included Slovaks, Ukrainians, Ruthenians, Lithuanians, and Poles. These immigrants were primarily Eastern Orthodox, Eastern Catholic and Roman Catholic.

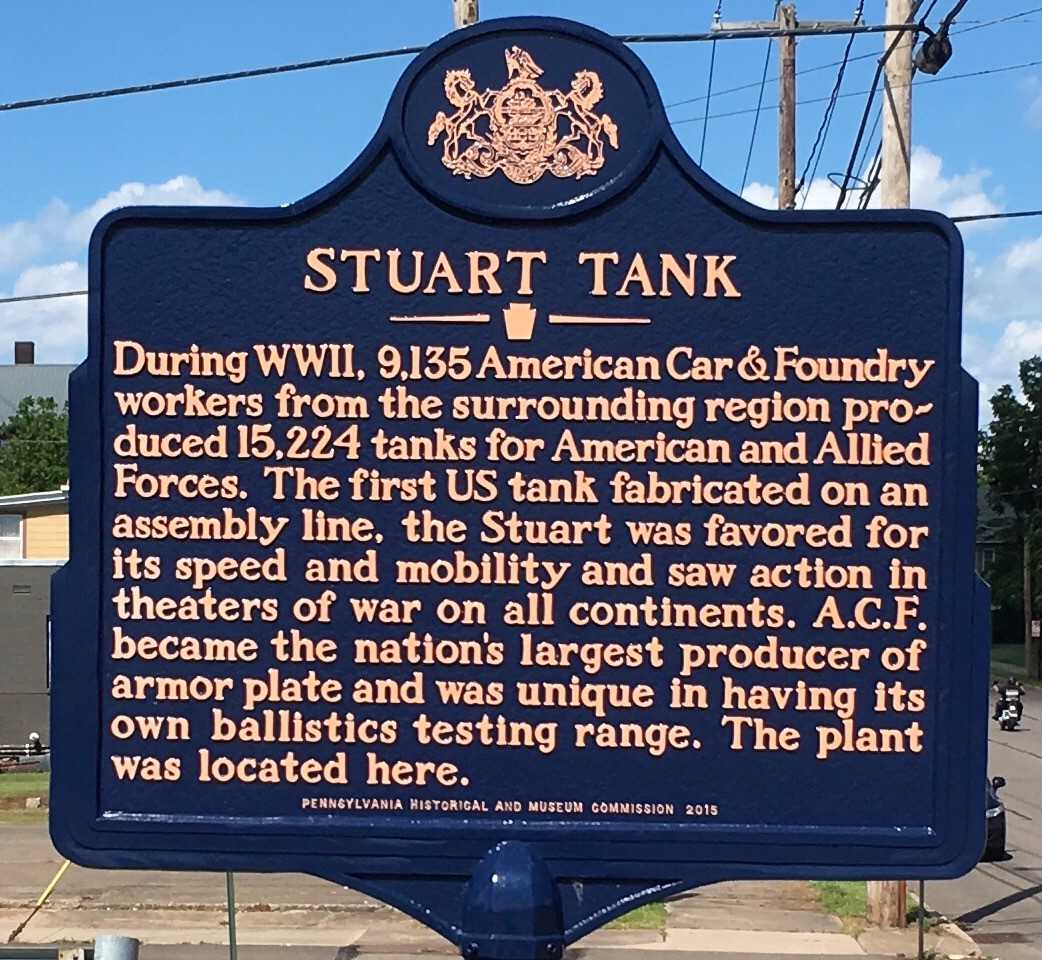
A history marker for Berwick's Stuart tank production

== Economy ==
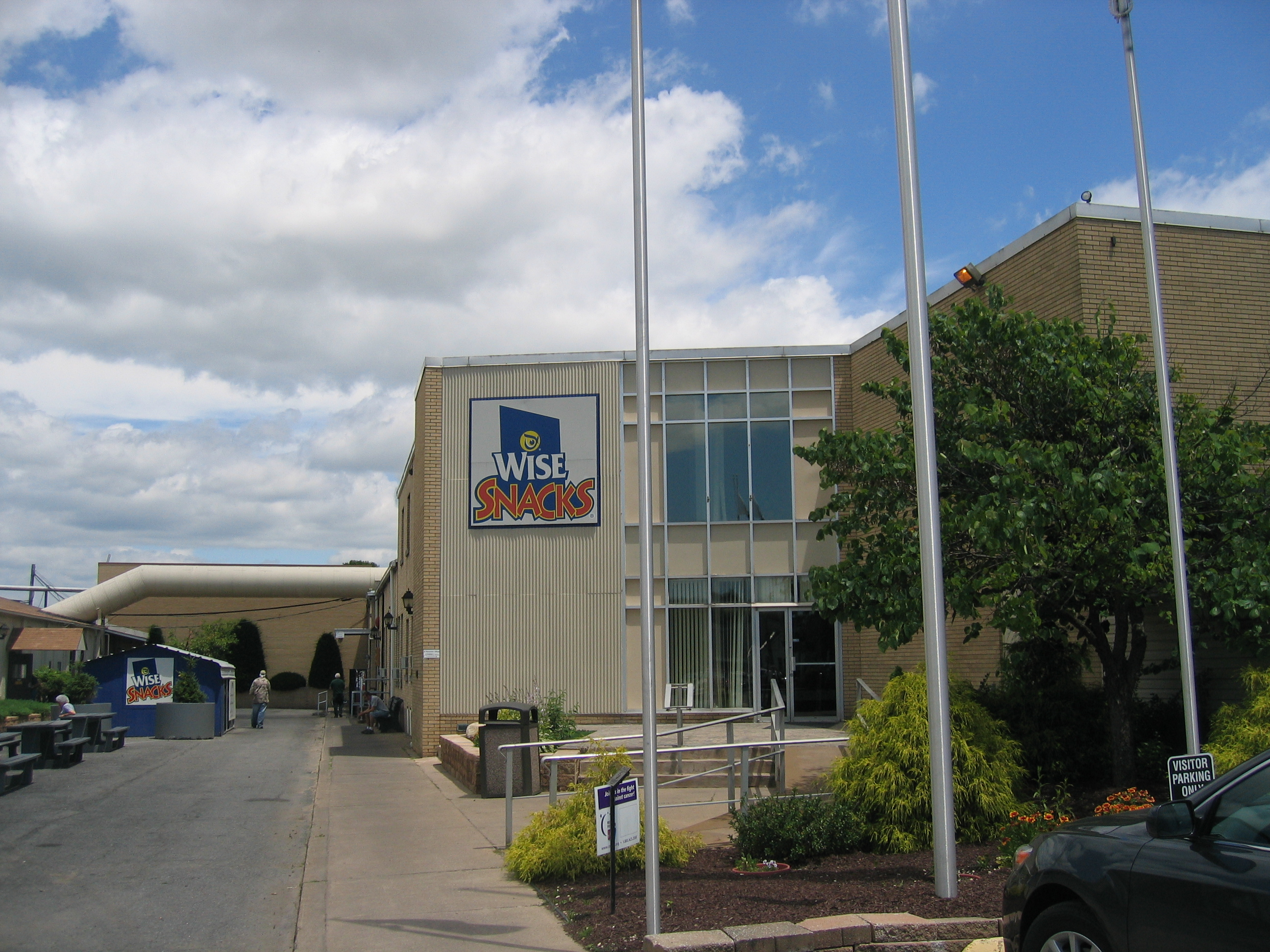
Entrance to the corporate headquarters and production plant of Wise Foods

Berwick was one of the places where the Stuart tank was produced in World War II, with over 15,000 of the tanks being manufactured at an American Car & Foundry plant in the town. The American Car & Foundry plant was also a producer of rolling stock for railroads. The borough is home to Berwick Offray, a gift ribbon manufacturing division of CSS Industries, and Wise Foods, a snack food company founded by Berwick native Earl Wise in the first half of the twentieth century, famous for its potato chips.

== Education ==
Berwick is within the Berwick Area School District.. There are five public schools located within the district: Berwick Area Senior High School, Berwick Area Middle School, Nescopeck Elementary School, West Berwick Elementary School, and Salem Elementary School. According to the Pennsylvania Department of Education, as of the 2009–10 school year, 94% of all students in the district attend class regularly and 88% of all students graduate on time.

Berwick is also served by Columbia-Montour Area Vocational-Technical School, Central Susquehanna Intermediate Unit 16, as well as a private school: Holy Family School (a Catholic-based school for grades Pre-4th). Holy Family also offers C.C.D

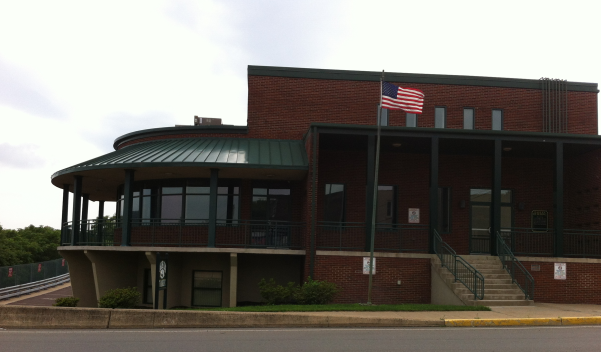
The Eagles Building

Berwick is home to a dedicated campus of Luzerne County Community College, located in the Eagles Building. Nearby colleges and universities include Bloomsburg University (12.4 mi), Penn State Hazleton (14.2 mi), the main campus of Luzerne County Community College in Nanticoke (21.9 mi), King's College (28.2 mi), and Wilkes University (28.2 mi).

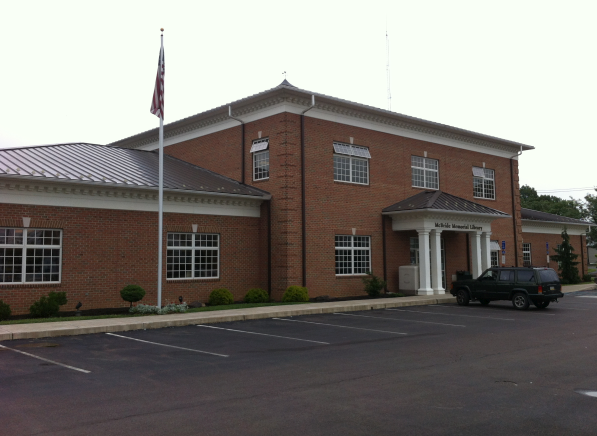
McBride Memorial Library

The Roman Catholic Diocese of Harrisburg operates Holy Family Consolidated School. In 2019 the school was scheduled to be closed, but it stayed open.

The McBride Memorial Library, opened to the public in January 2008, serves the residents of Berwick and its surrounding areas have the Bloomsburg Public Library, the Orangeville Public Library, and libraries at those colleges and universities listed above.

== Notable people ==
- Nick Adams, actor, The Rebel (interred)
- Thomas Bowman, Methodist Episcopal bishop
- Peter Calamai, science journalist
- Russ Canzler, baseball player - third base
- Zehnder Confair, Pennsylvania State Senator
- George Curry, football coach
- John Gordner, Pennsylvania State Senator
- Matt Karchner, baseball pitcher
- Jake Kelchner, football quarterback
- Douglas Major, composer of sacred music and concert organist
- Warren P. Noble, congressman
- Bo Orlando, football player
- Billy Petrolle, boxer
- Tony Piet, baseball player
- Ron Powlus, football quarterback
- Benjamin F. Rittenhouse, Civil War hero
- Richard Sharpe Shaver, writer and artist
- Mike Souchak, golfer
- Jimmy Spencer, racecar driver and commentator
- Ted Stuban, politician
- Jayson Terdiman, Olympic luger
- Joe Torsella, Pennsylvania State Treasurer
- Betty Winkler, radio actress
- William H. Woodin, FDR's first Treasury Secretary
- Jared Verse, football player

== Photo gallery of the Berwick area ==
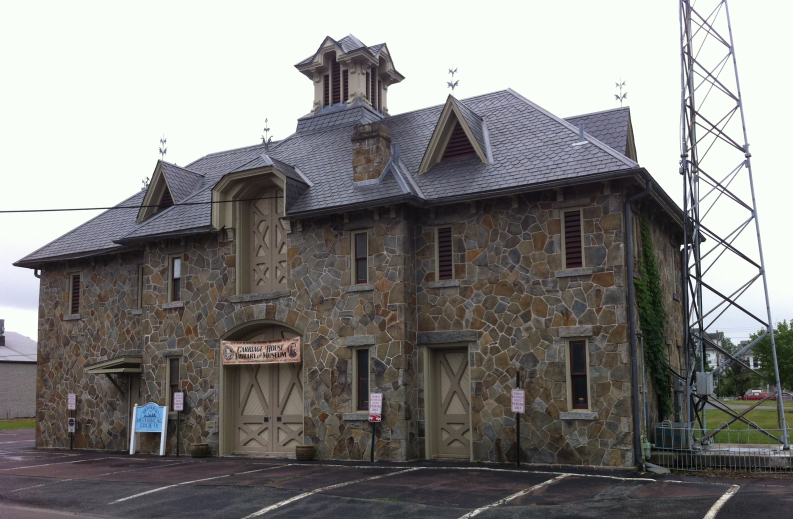
The carriage house behind Jackson mansion

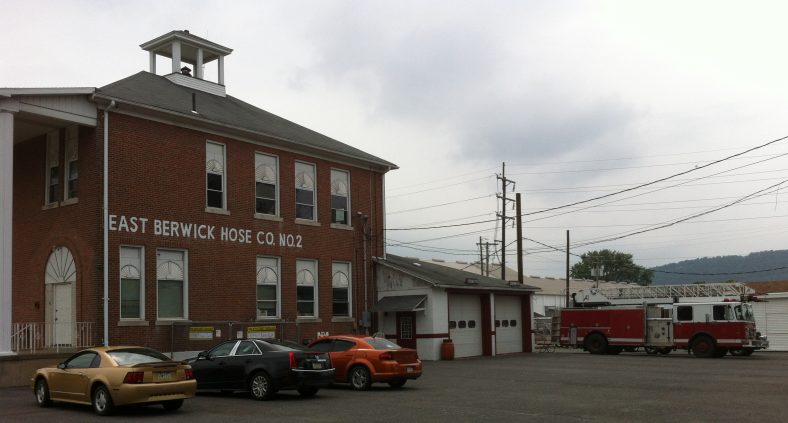
The fire hall of the East Berwick Fire Co.

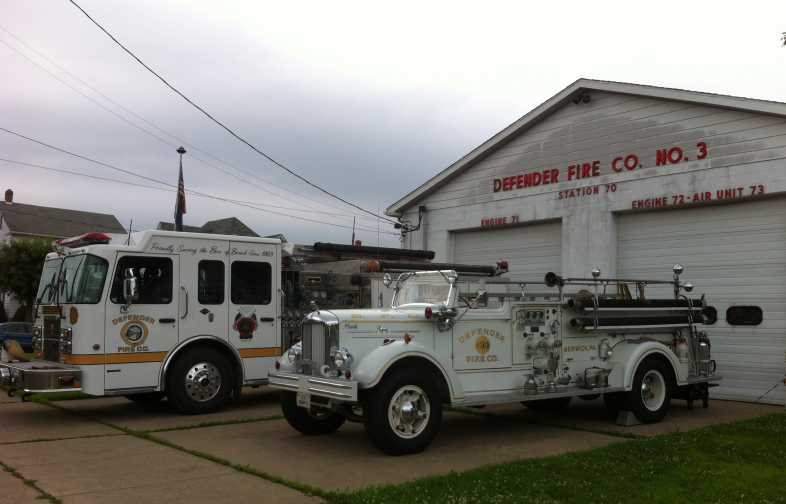
Defender volunteer fire company. The older engine for show and parades

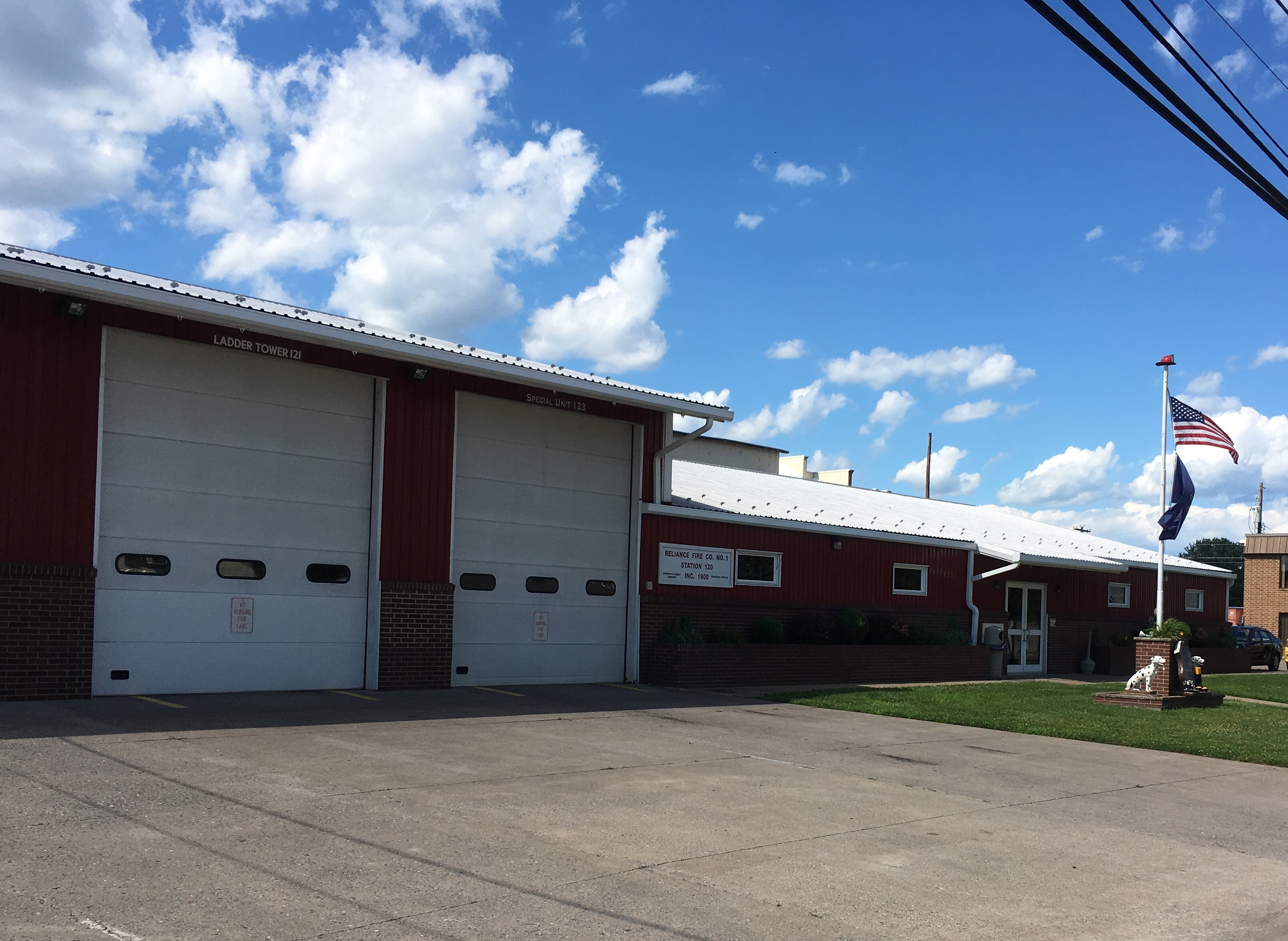
Reliance Fire Company

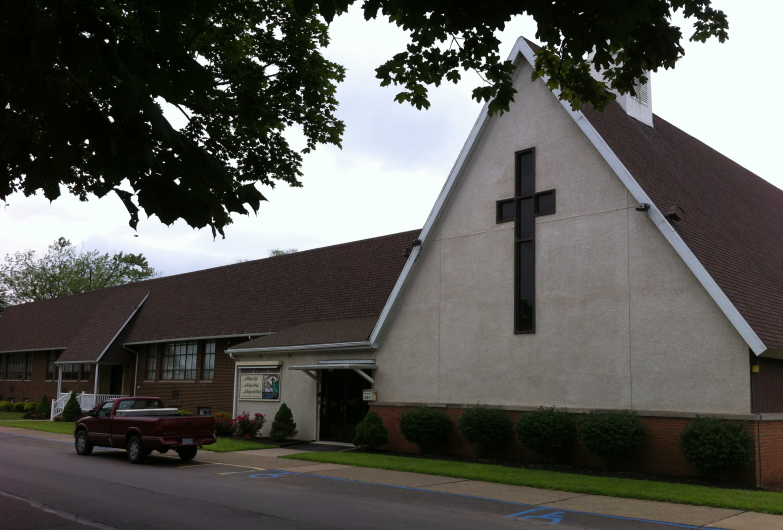
Berwick Christian Church (in East Berwick)

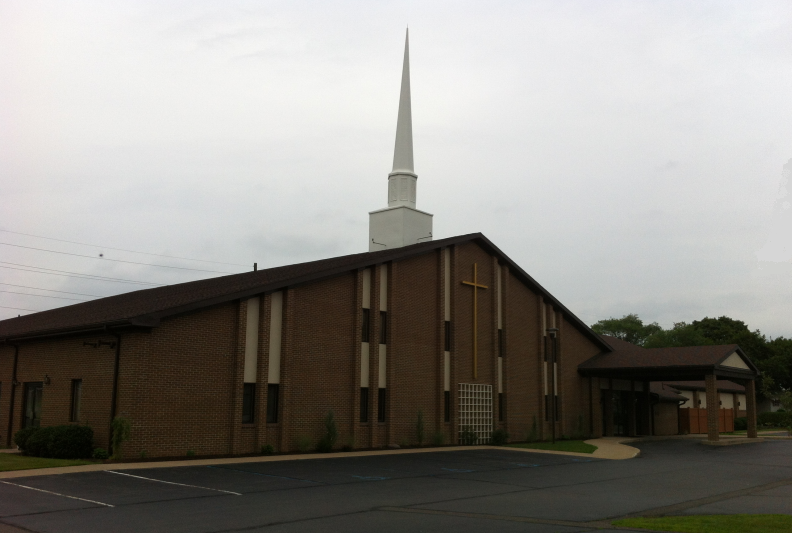
Berwick Assembly of God Church (in East Berwick)

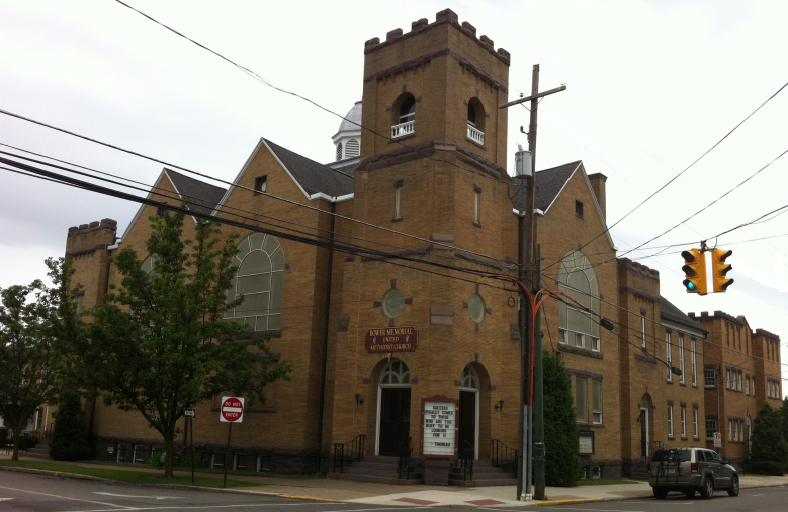
Bower Memorial United Methodist Church

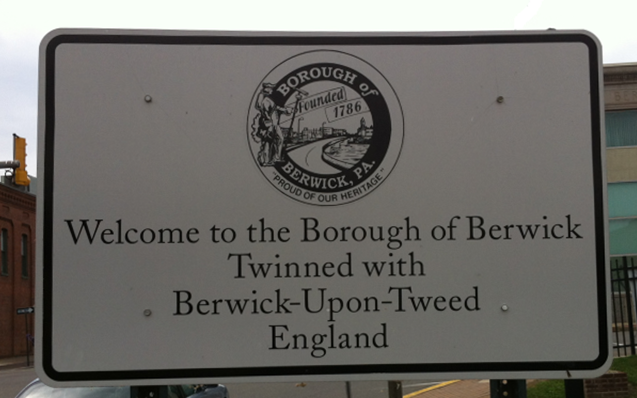
Berwick has a special relationship with Berwick-Upon-Tweed in England.

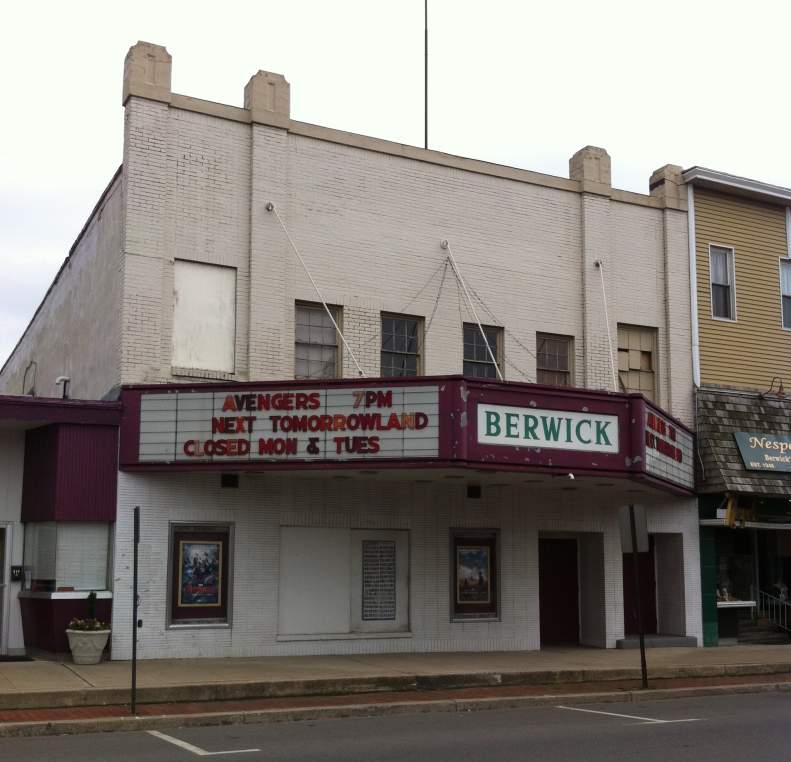
Berwick Theater, still showing films in 2017

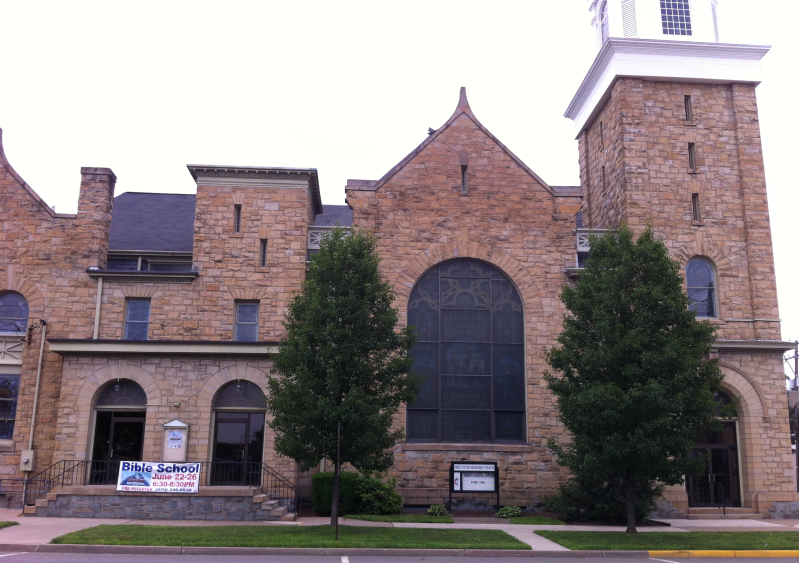
1st United Methodist Church

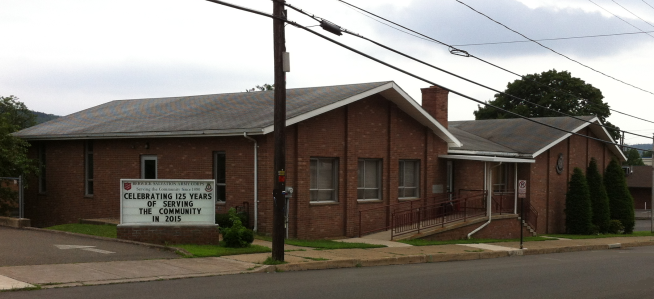
Salvation Army building

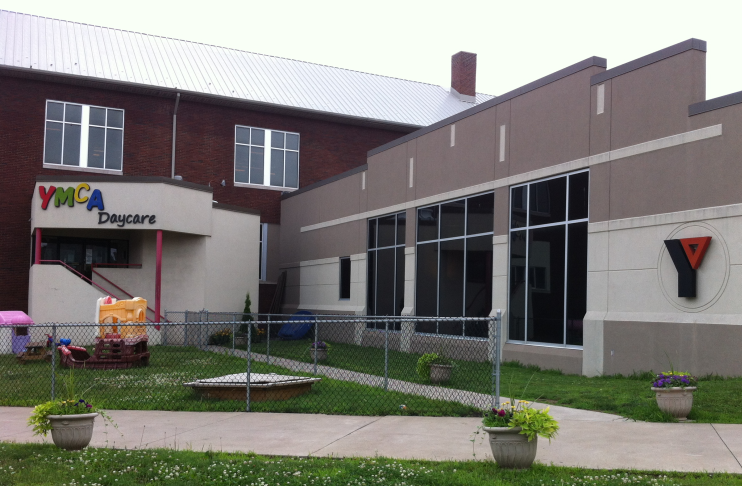
The Berwick YMCA, in a former school building

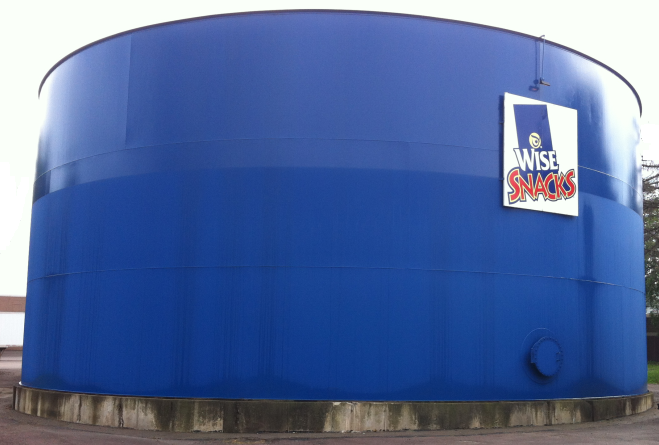
Water storage tank for Wise Snacks

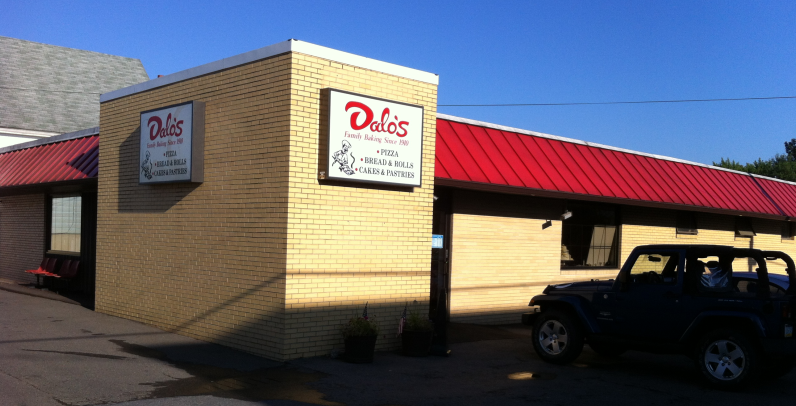
Dalo's, a long-standing bakery

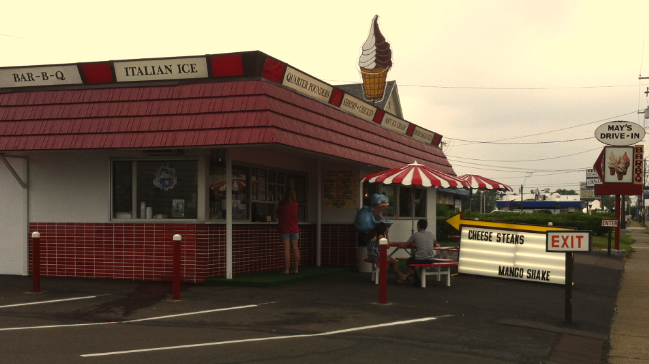
May's Drive In, long time landmark

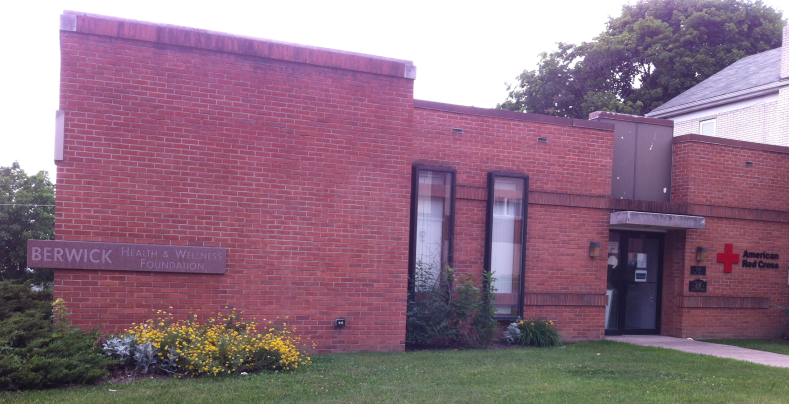
Berwick Red Cross building

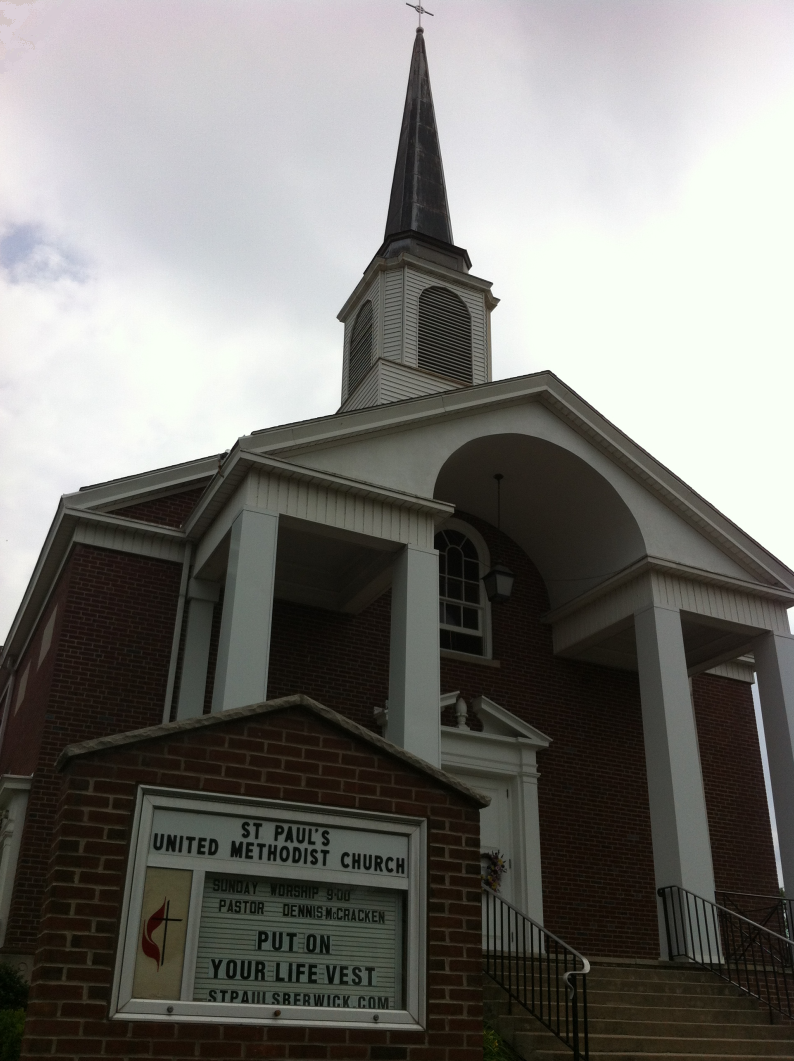
St. Paul United Methodist Church

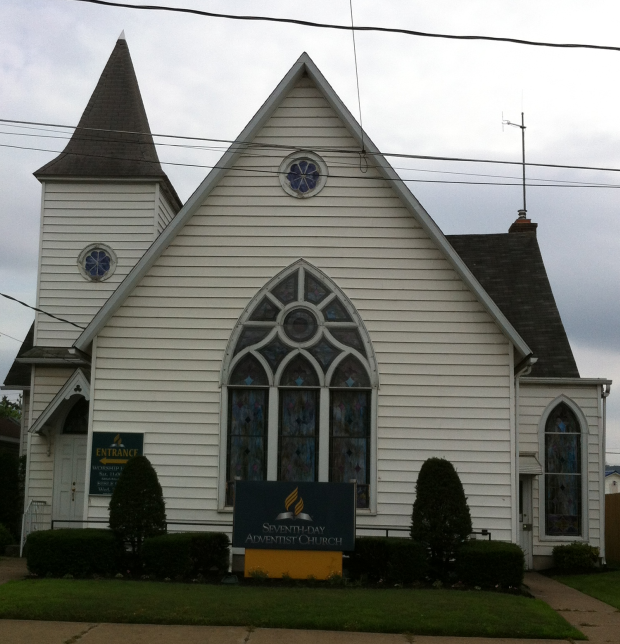
Seventh Day Adventist Church

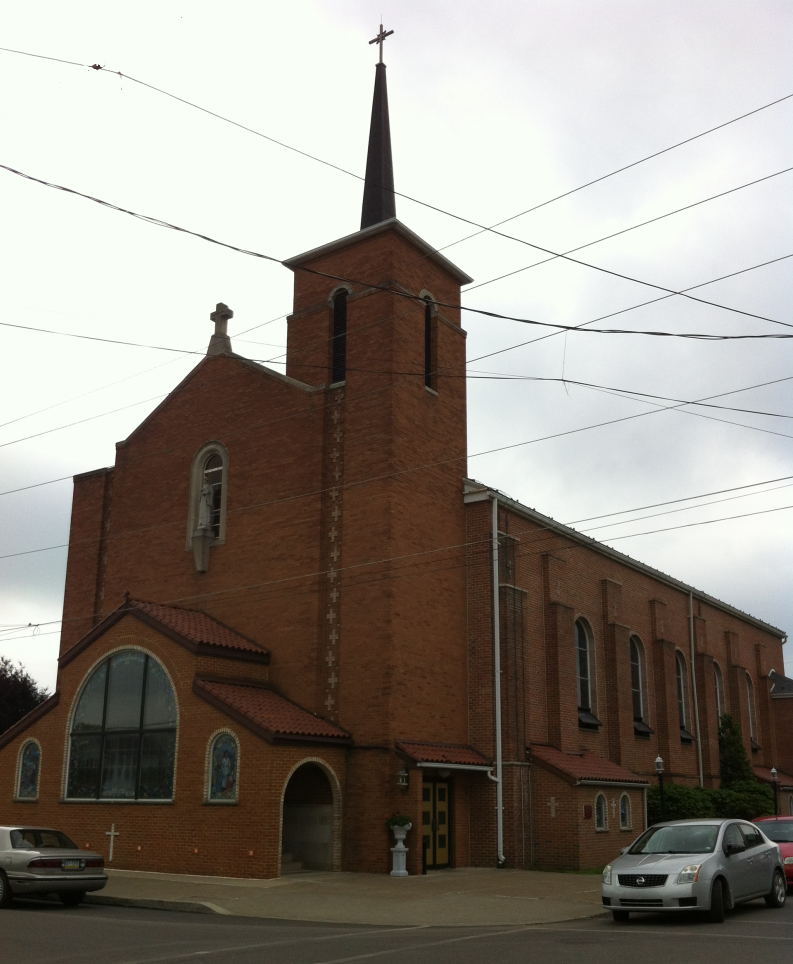
St. Joseph Catholic Church

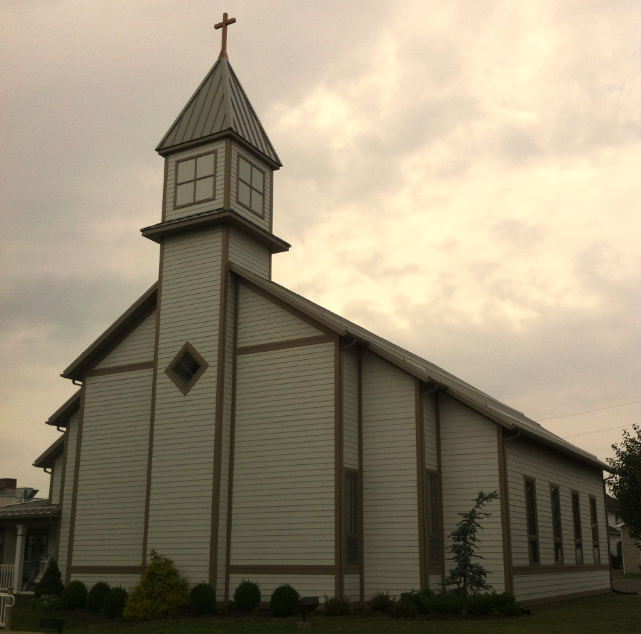
Grace Lutheran Church

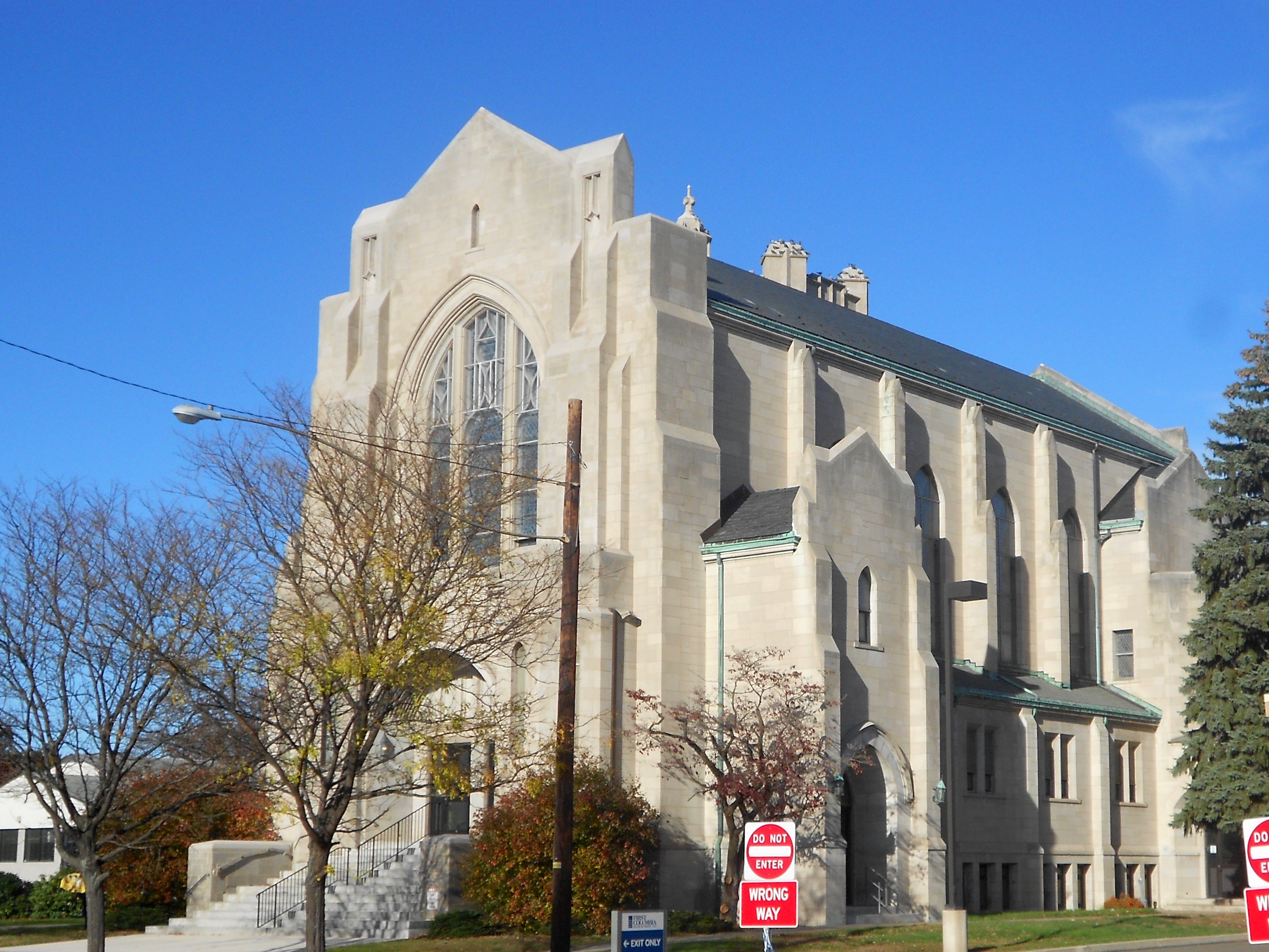
First Presbyterian Church (PCUSA)

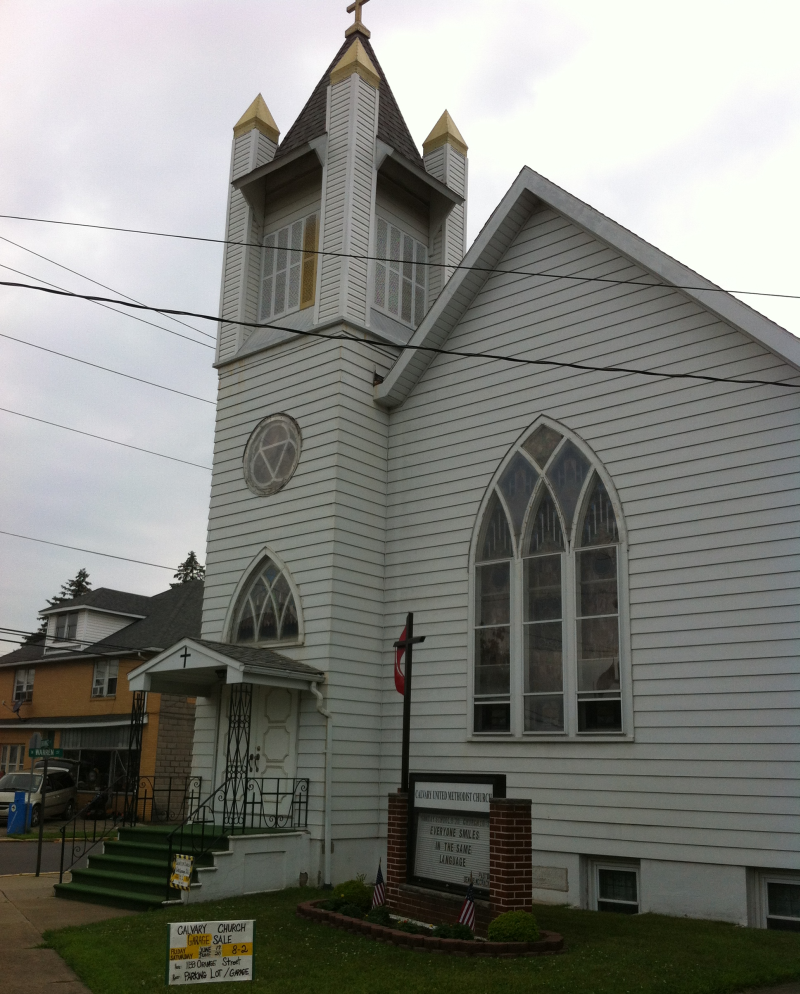
Calvary United Methodist Church

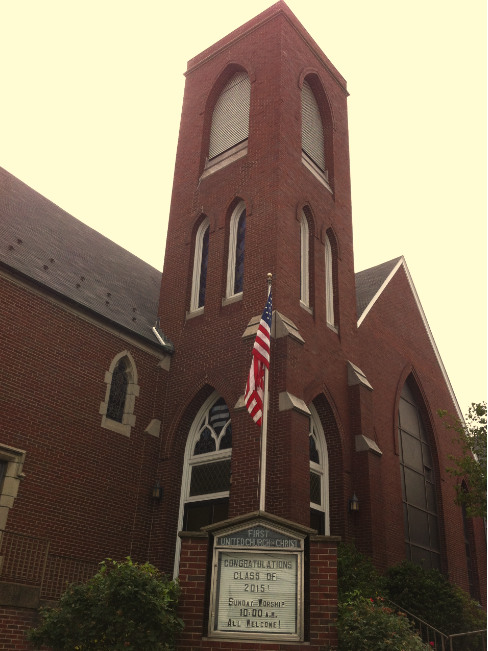
1st United Church of Christ

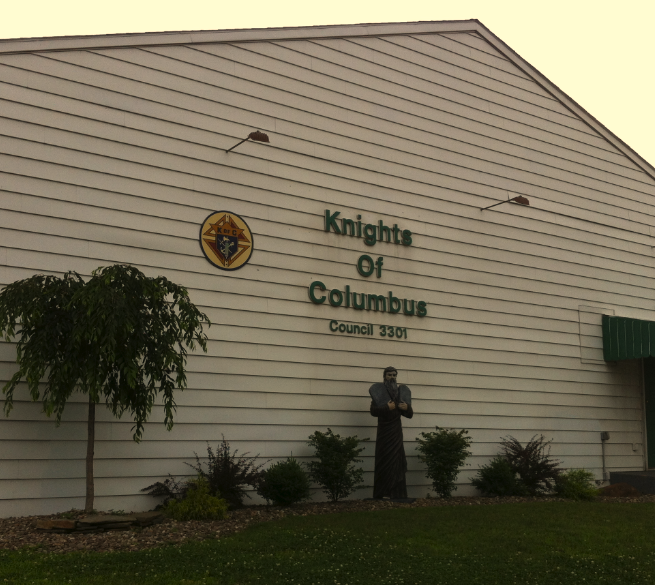
Knights of Columbus

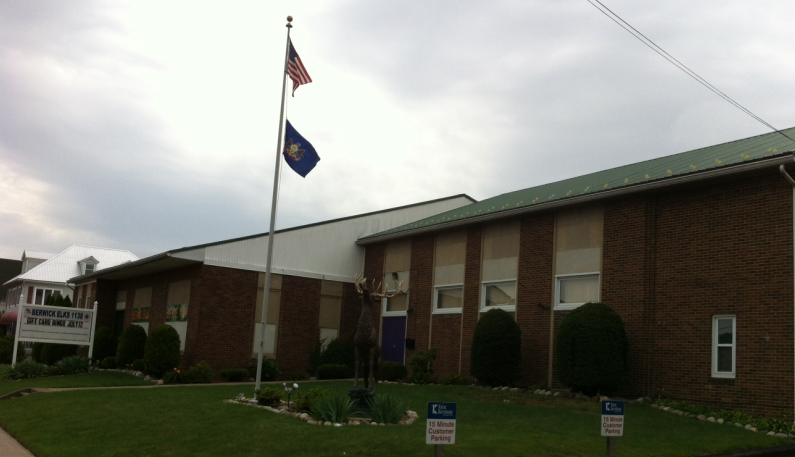
The Elks club building

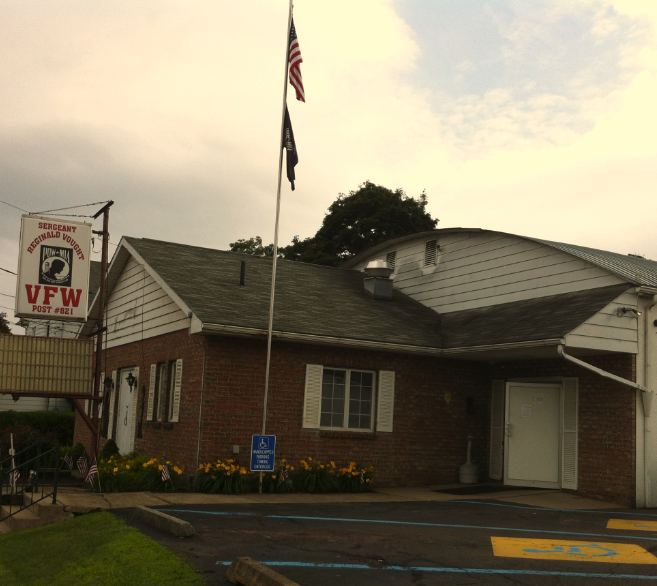
VFW post

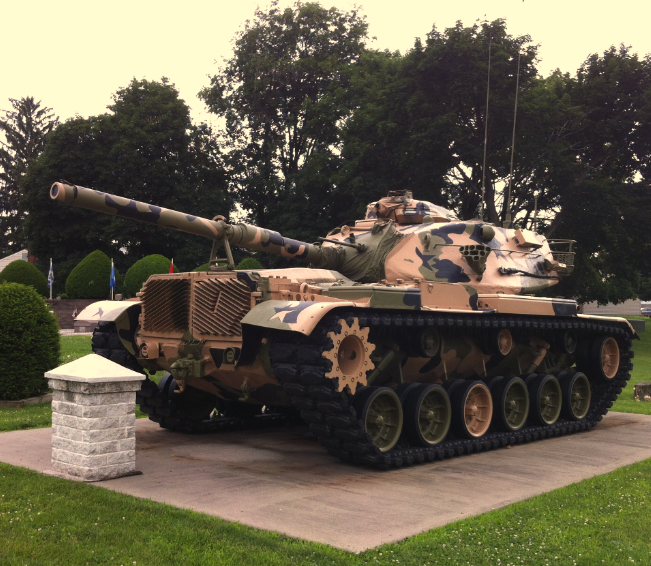
Army tank behind VFW post

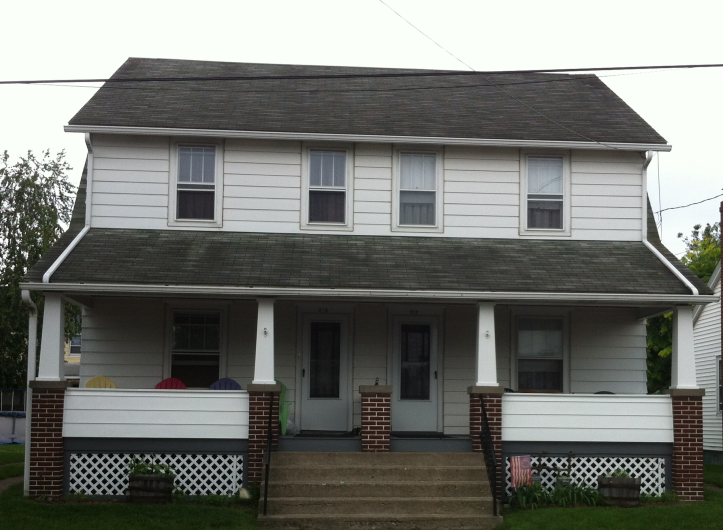
"Double house" (duplex), one of many built in first half of 20th century

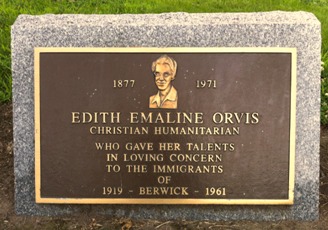
Edith Orvis, who came to help meet the social and spiritual needs of immigrants

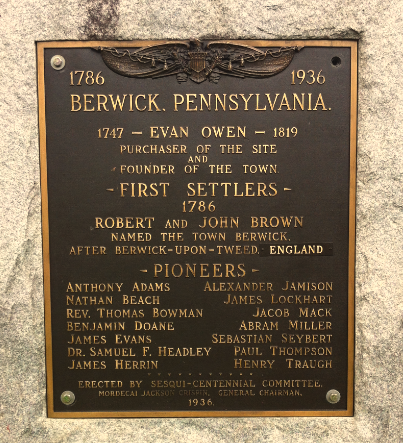
Founders of Berwick

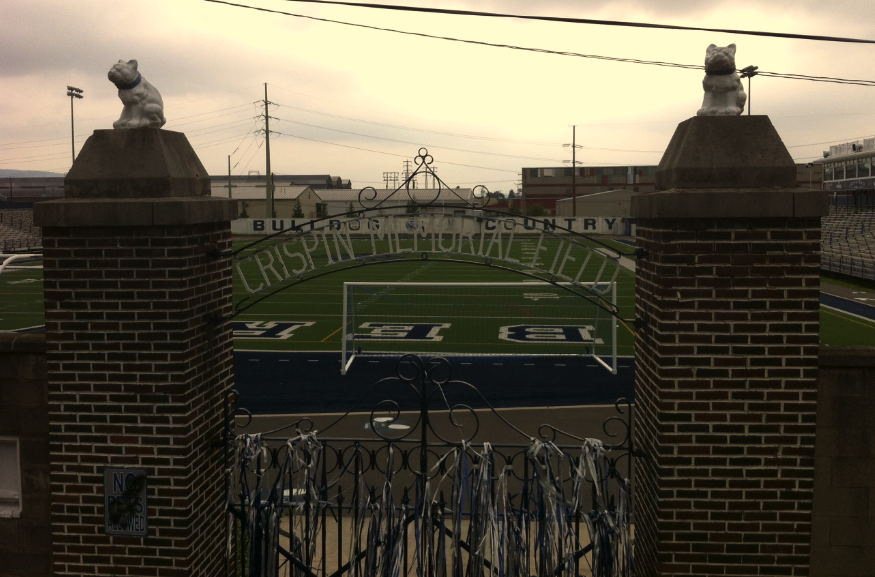
Crispin Field, home of the Bulldogs

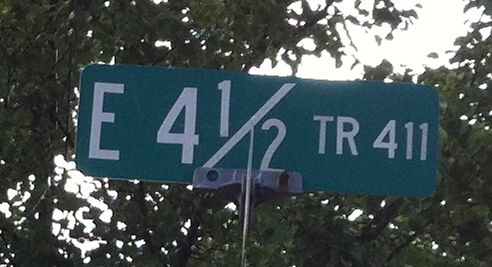
Four and a half street, a unique street name, running from Berwick into Salem Township

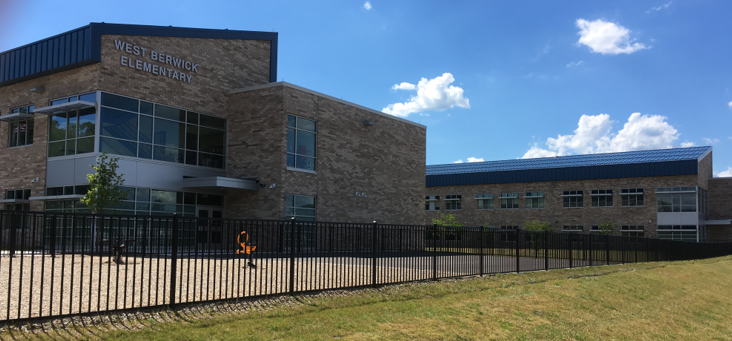
West Berwick Elementary school

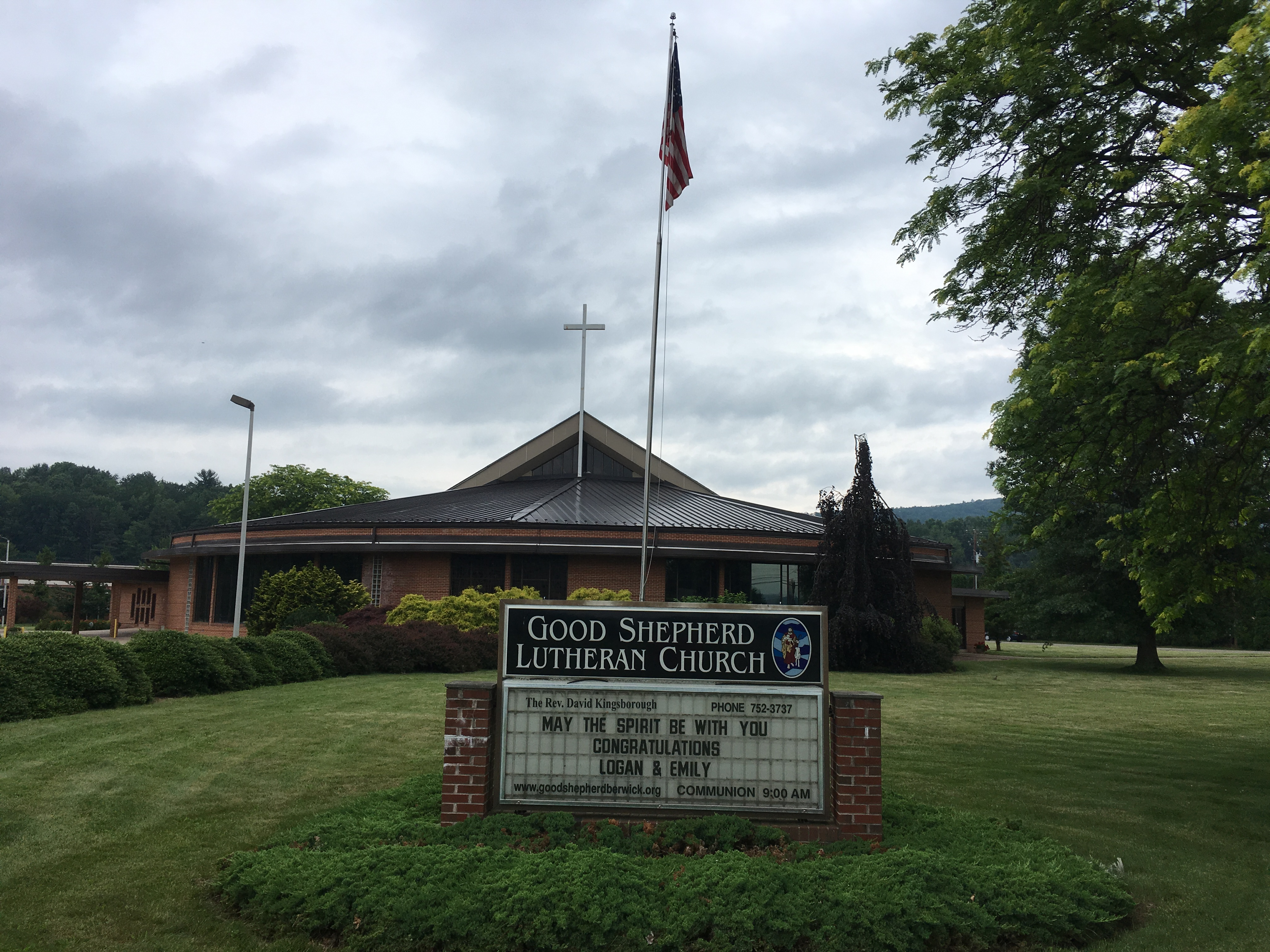
Good Shepherd Lutheran Church

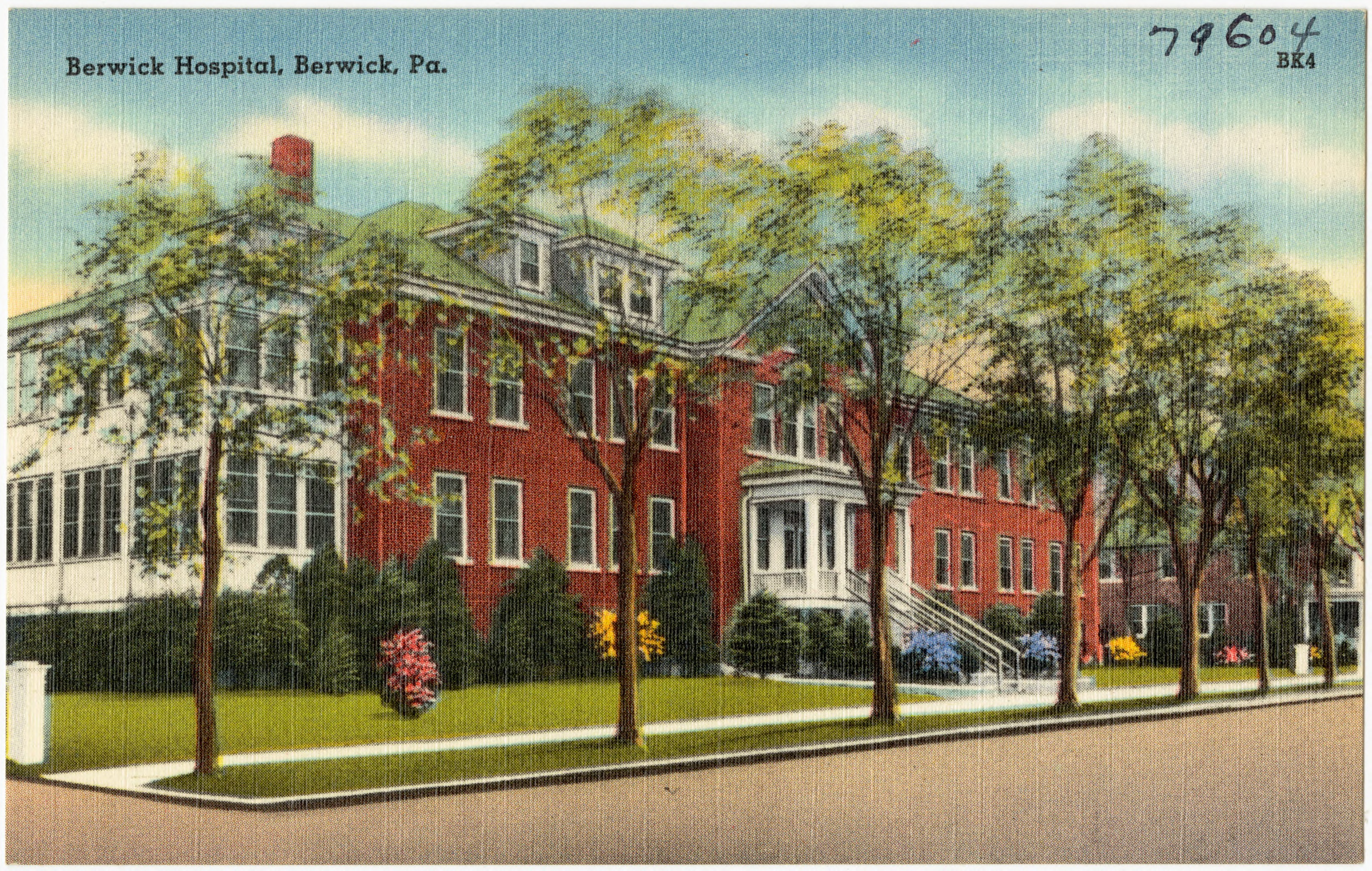
Former Berwick Hospital

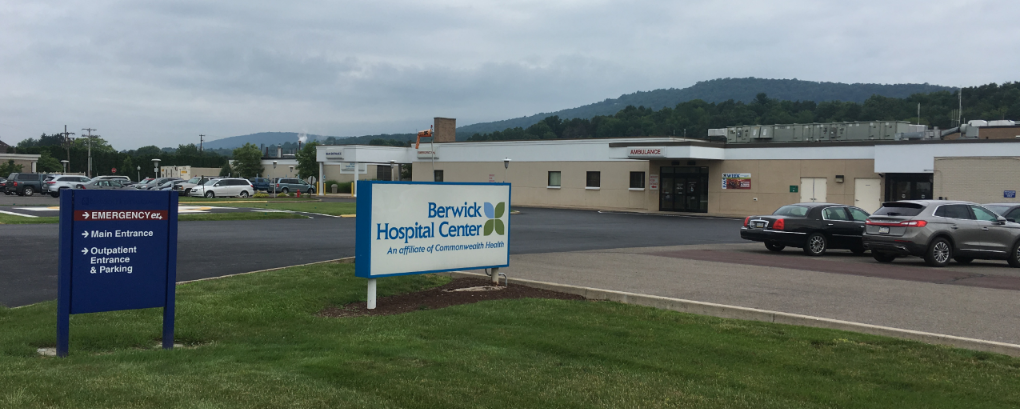
Berwick Hospital

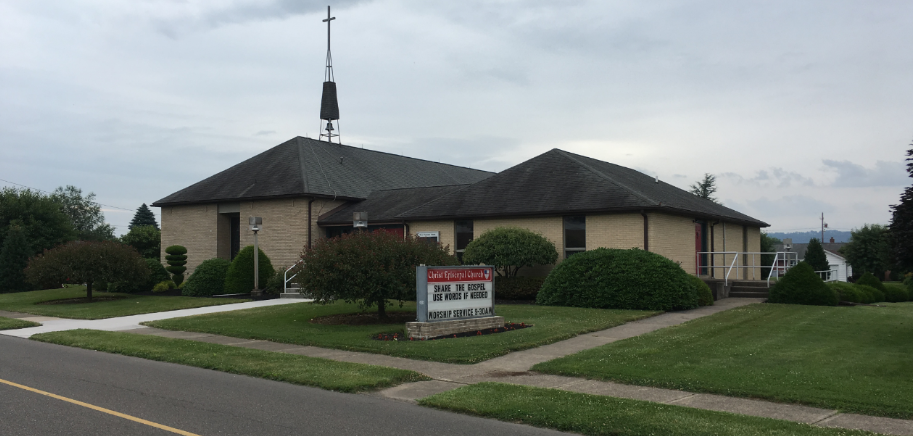
Christ Episcopal Church

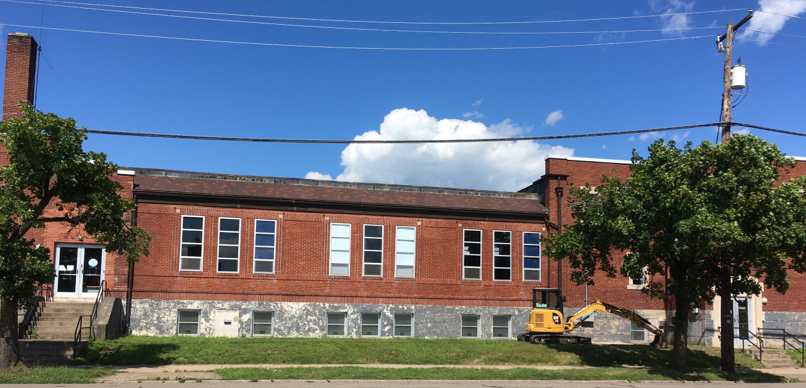
National Guard armory from 1922

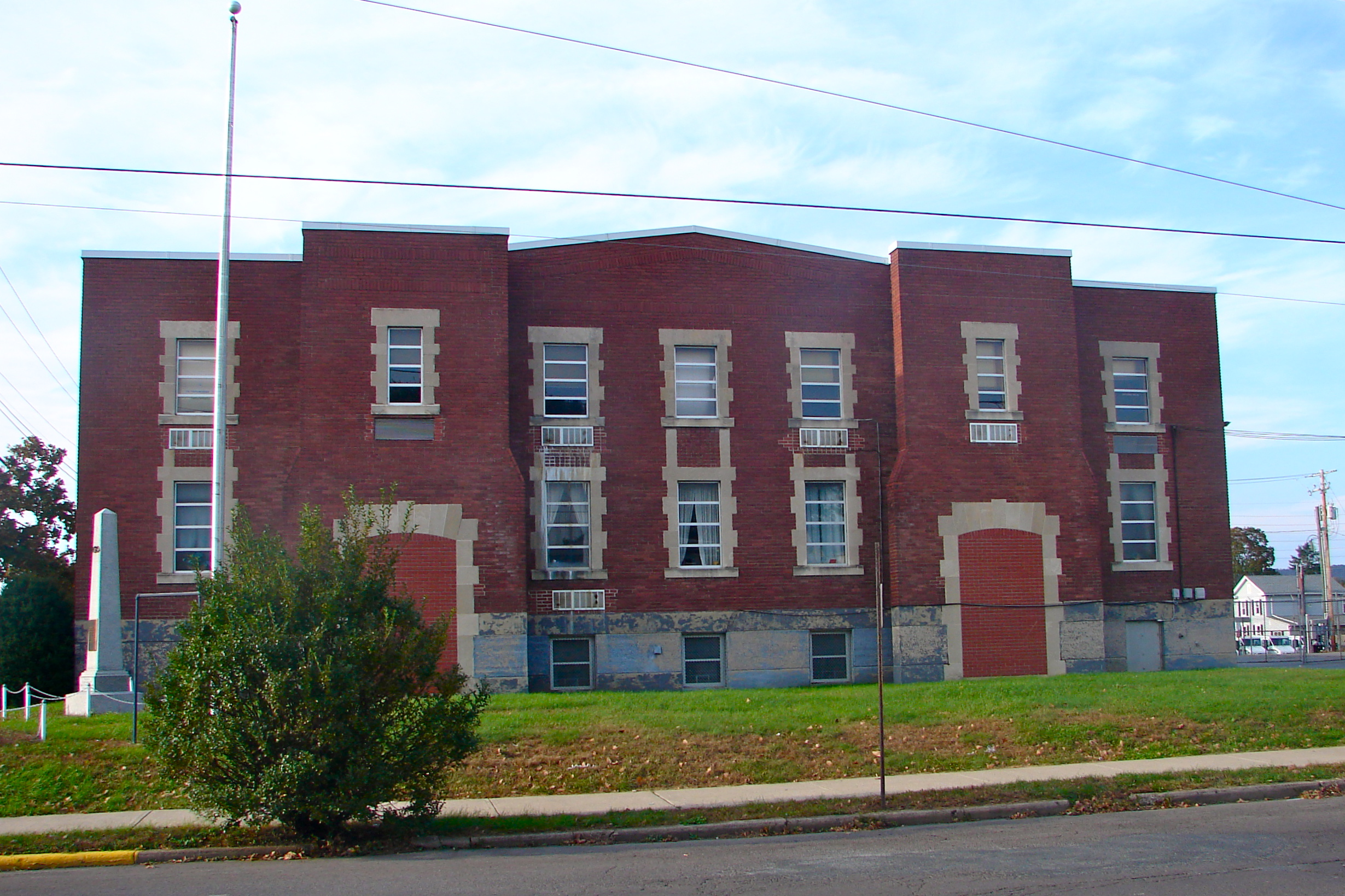
South end of armory

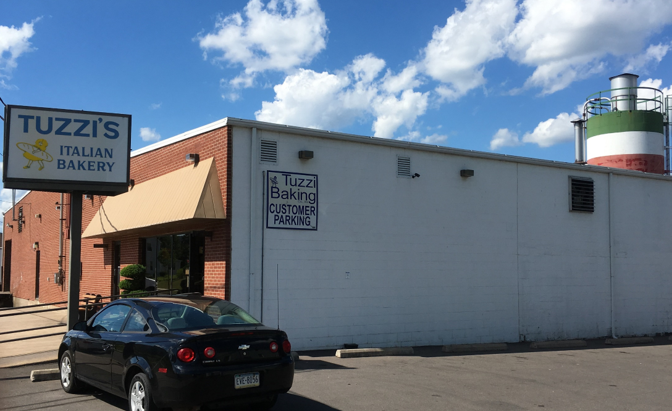
Tuzzi's Italian Bakery, family owned & local landmark.

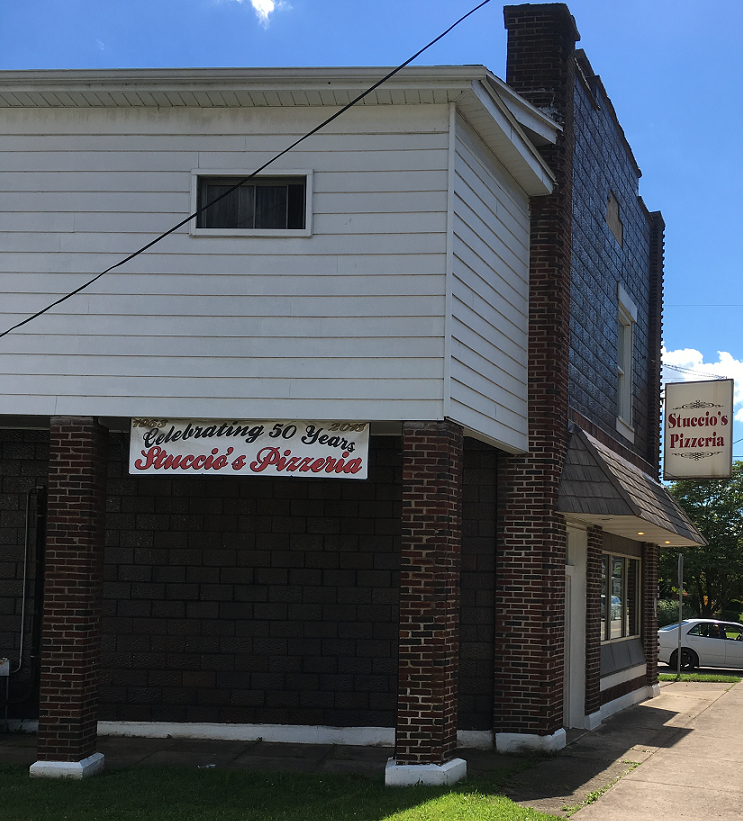
Stuccio's Pizza in Berwick, celebrating 50 years in business

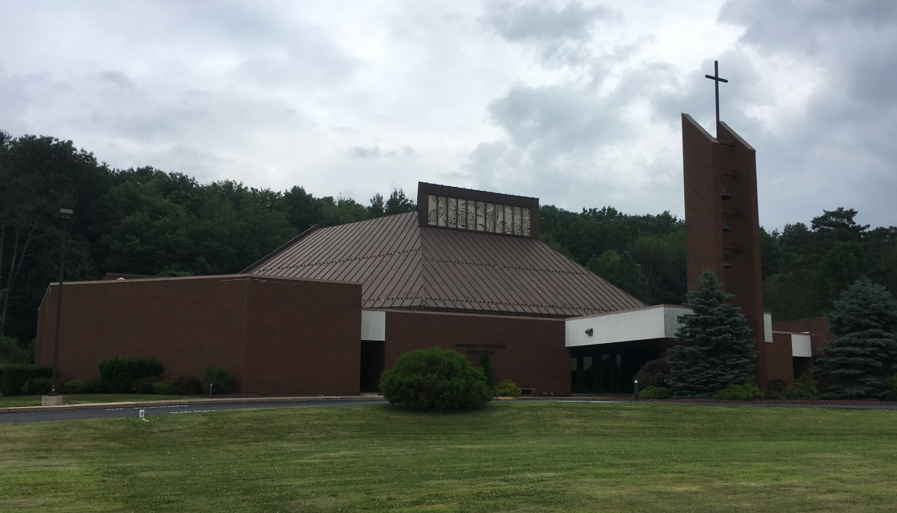
Immaculate Conception Roman Catholic Church

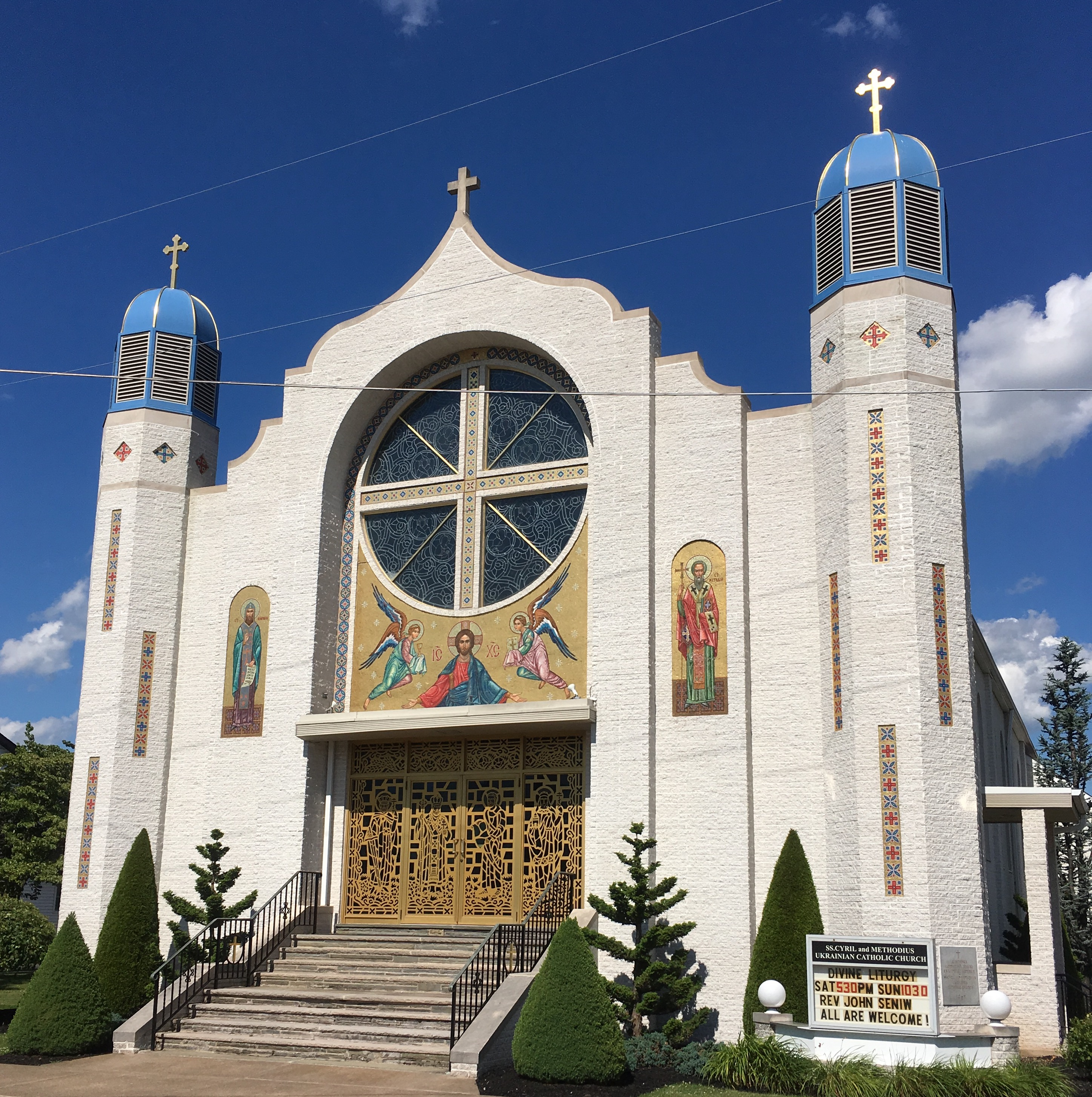
Saints Cyril & Methodius Ukrainian Catholic Church

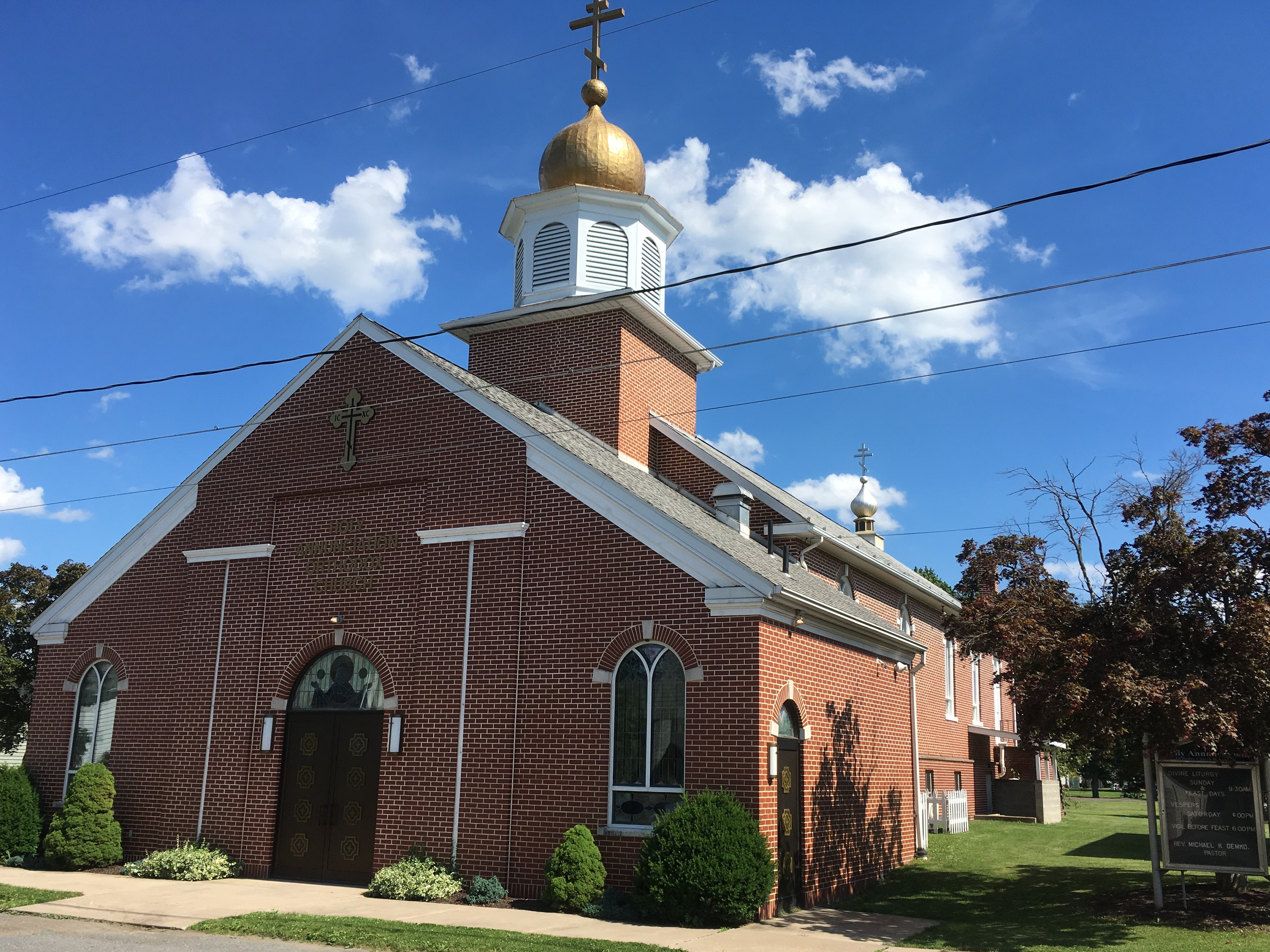
Holy Annunciation Orthodox Church, Berwick PA.

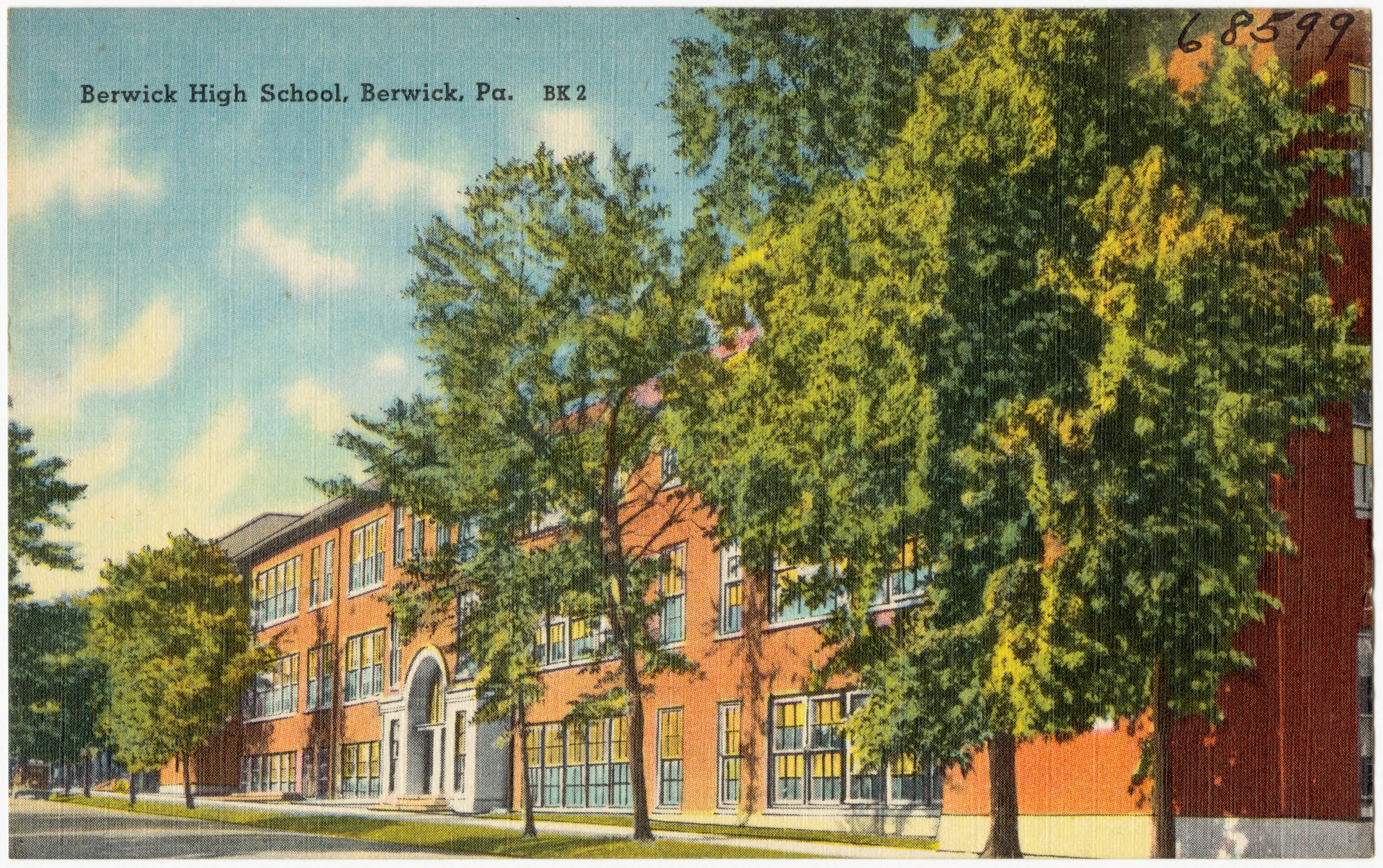
old Berwick High School, no longer standing

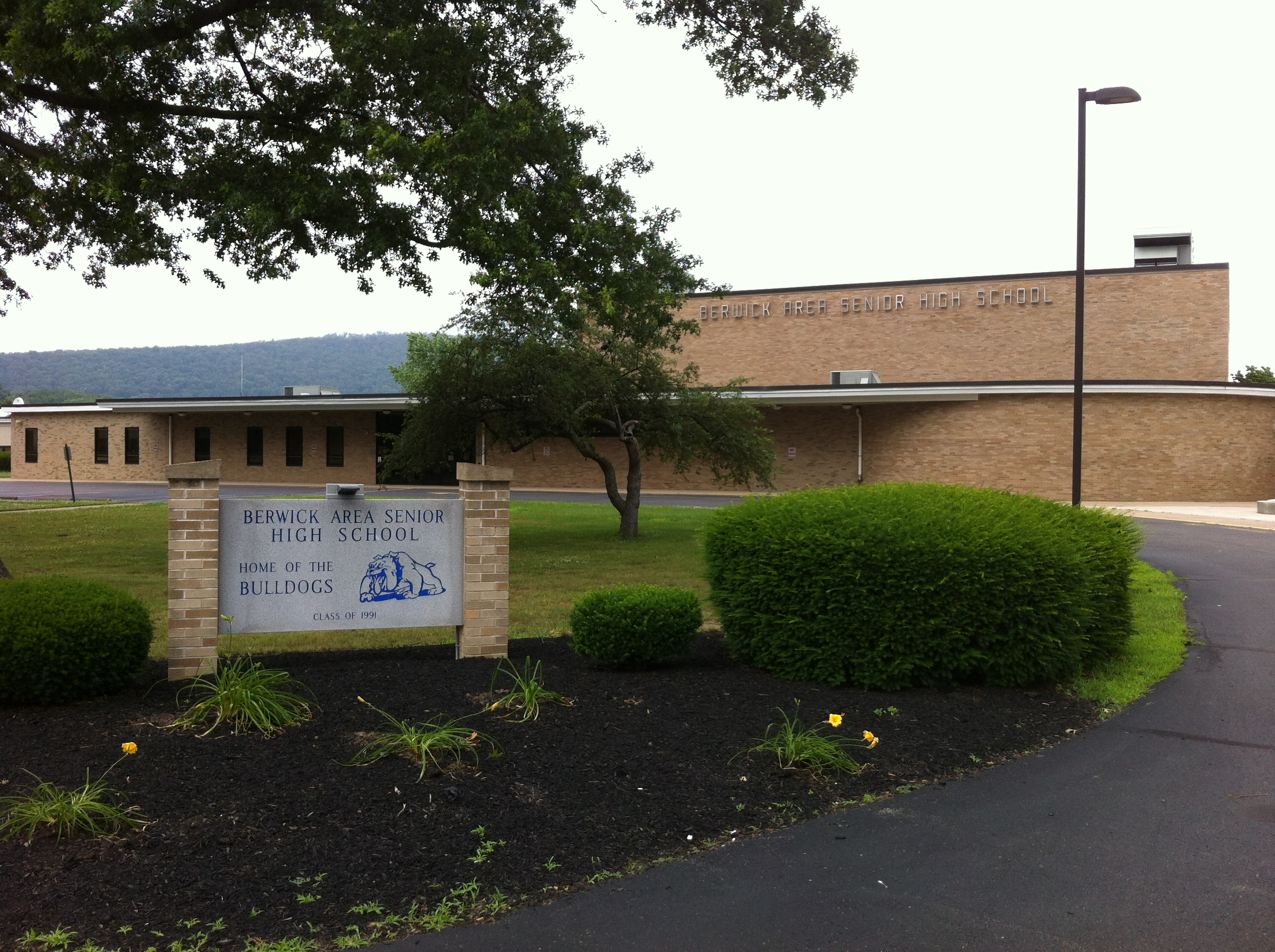
Berwick High School

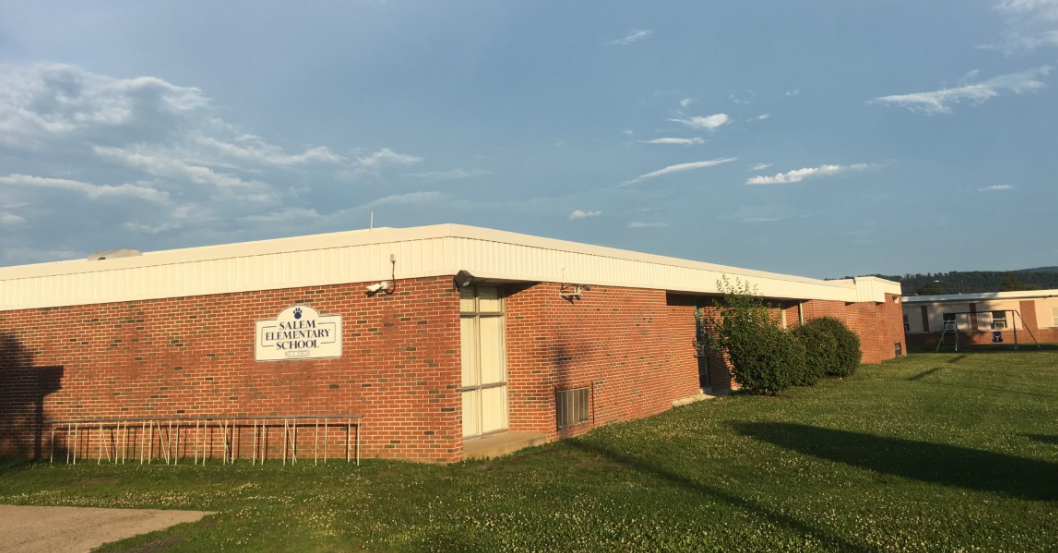
Salem Elementary School in East Berwick

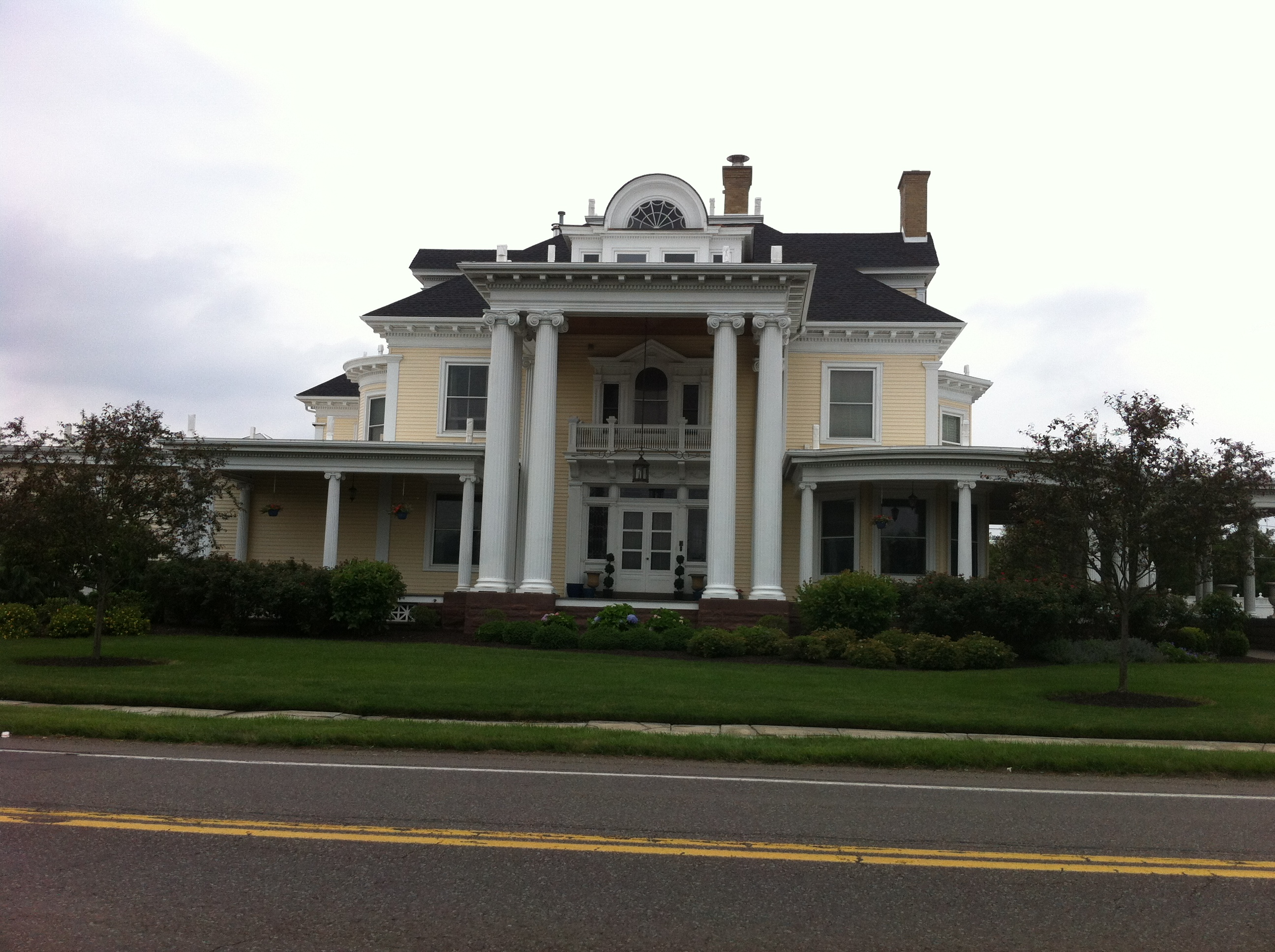
Crispin Mansion in East Berwick
