= Jackson Mansion and Carriage House =

Historic house in Pennsylvania, United States

- U.S. National Register of Historic Places
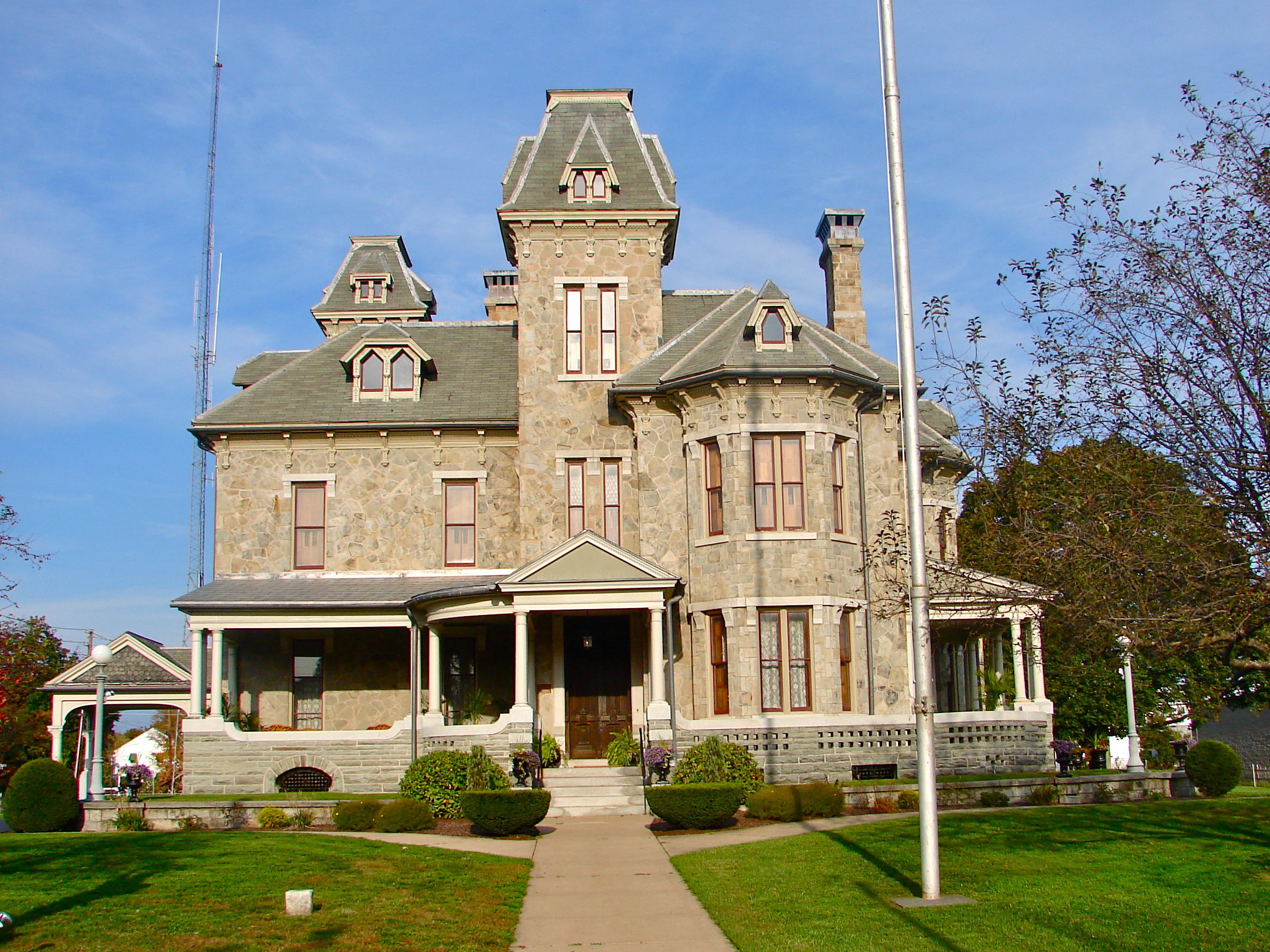
- Jackson Mansion, October 2011

- Location within Pennsylvania Location within the United States
- Location: 344 Market St., Berwick, Pennsylvania
- Coordinates: 41°3′27″N 76°14′7″W
- Area: 1.4 acres (0.57 ha)
- Built: 1877
- Architect: Brugler, Mr.
- Architectural style: Second Empire, Italianate
- NRHP reference No.: 85001965
- Added to NRHP: September 5, 1985

The Jackson Mansion and Carriage House is an historic home and carriage house which are located in Berwick, Columbia County, Pennsylvania, United States.

It was added to the National Register of Historic Places in 1985.

== History and architectural features ==
The mansion was built in 1877, is three stories tall with a basement, and was surfaced with Vermont stone and designed in a Second Empire/Italianate style. The front facade features a three-story central tower with a mansard roof and pedimented portico supported by Doric order columns. The carriage house is a two-story, hipped roof building faced with Vermont stone. The mansion once housed the Berwick City Hall and is now home of the Berwick Historical Society.

== Gallery ==
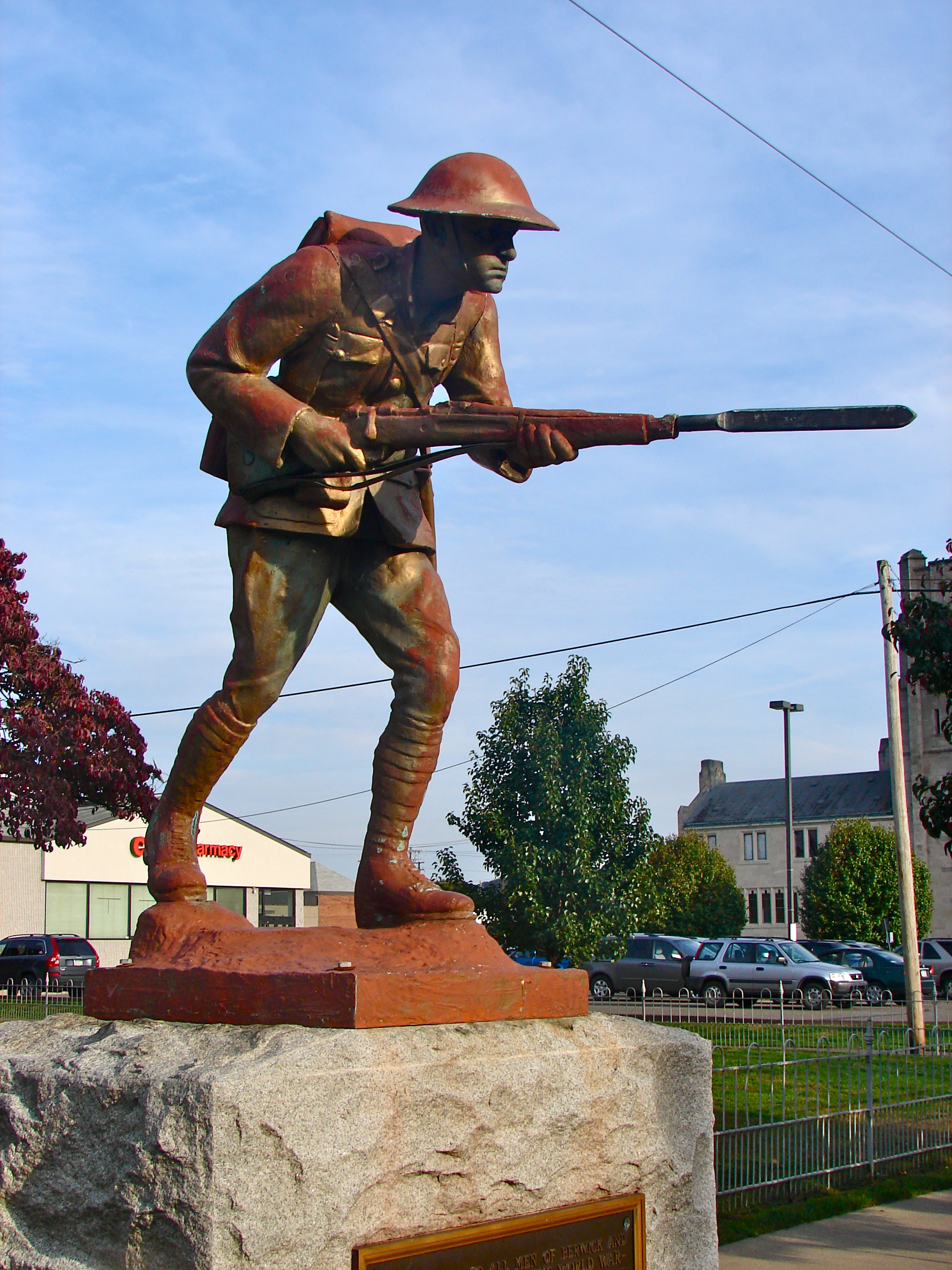
World War I Memorial in front of the mansion

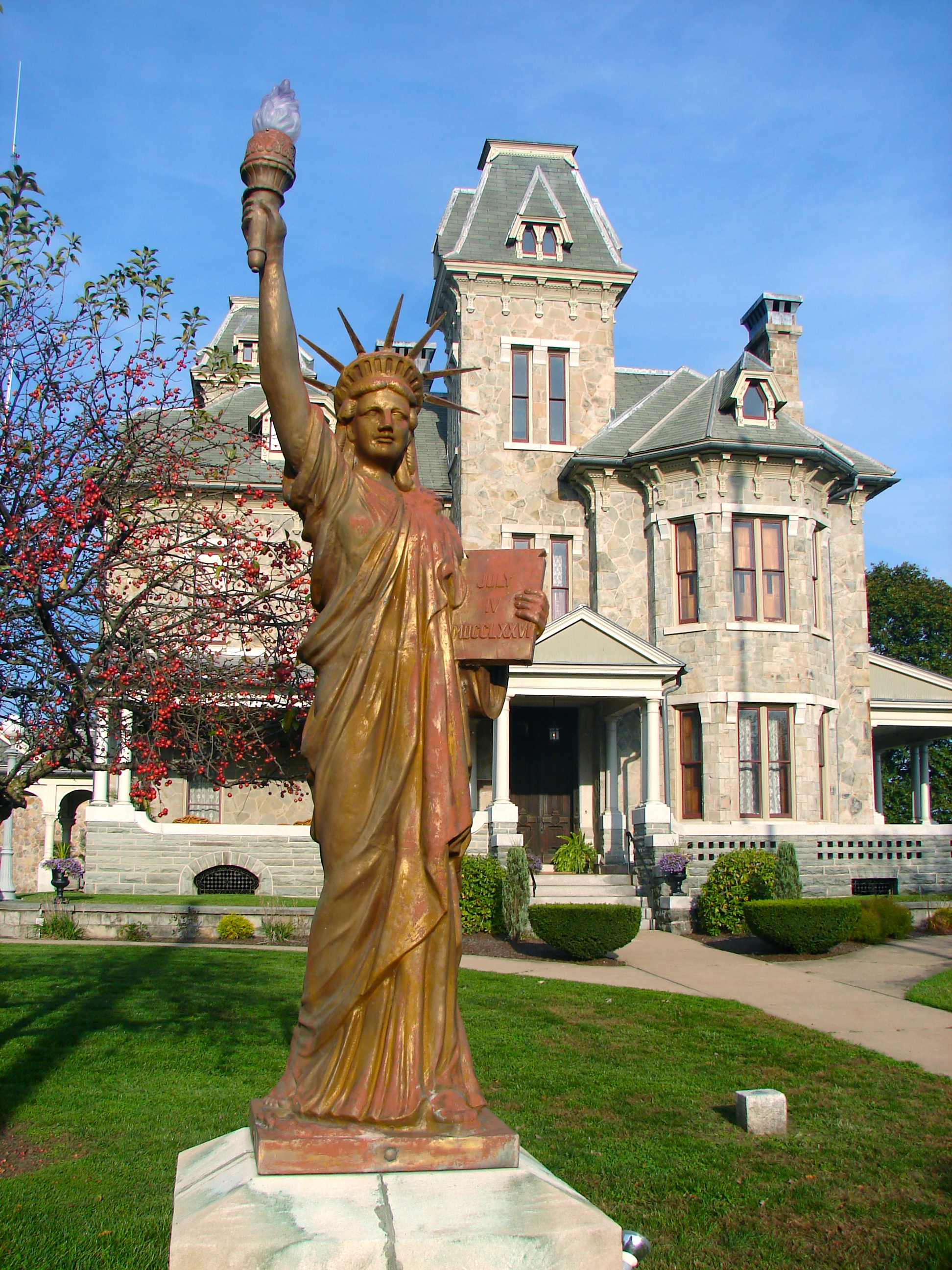
Statue of Liberty replica in front of the mansion

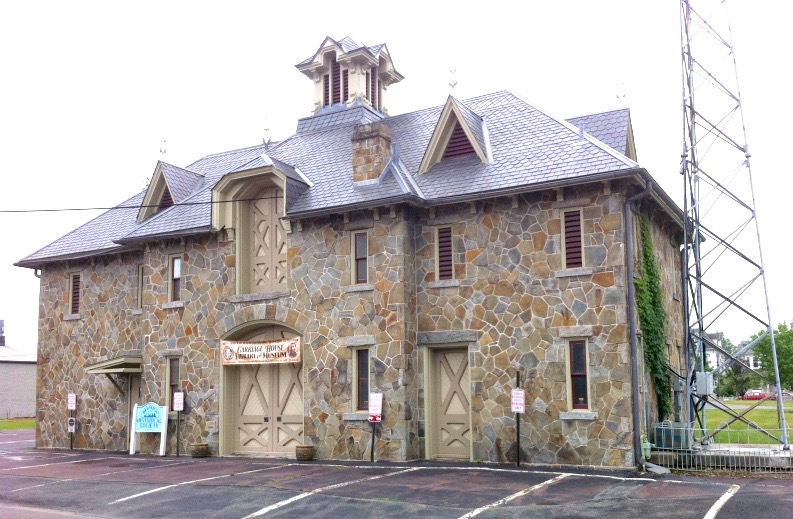
Carriage house behind mansion
