= Jake Kelchner =

American football player (born 1970)

No. 17
- Position: Quarterback

Personal information
- Born: June 27, 1970 (age 56); Berwick, Pennsylvania, U.S.
- Listed height: 6 ft 2 in (1.88 m)
- Listed weight: 215 lb (98 kg)

Career information
- College: Notre Dame (1990–1991); West Virginia (1992–1993)

Career history
- 1994: Las Vegas Posse
- 1995: Tampa Bay Storm
- 1996: Florida Bobcats
- 1998: Grand Rapids Rampage

Awards and highlights
- ArenaBowl champion (1995)

Jake Kelchner (born June 27, 1970) is a former starting quarterback for West Virginia University during the 1990s. He was part of the mountaineers undefeated 1993 team. Kelchner also went on to play one season in the Canadian Football League (CFL) and three seasons in the Arena Football League (AFL).

== College career ==
Kelchner started his college career at the University of Notre Dame. Notre Dame had also signed Rick Mirer of Goshen, Indiana, the No. 1 prospect in the country. Two years later Kelchner transferred to West Virginia.

== Professional career ==
In 1994, he played 1 game with the Las Vegas Posse of the Canadian Football League. Additionally, Kelchner played with the Tampa Bay Storm, Florida Bobcats and Grand Rapids Rampage for 3 seasons over 4 years.

== Personal life ==
Jake Kelchner married Morgantown native Kimberly Knouse in 2002. They have two children. He now resides in Ravenna, Ohio.
