= Briar Creek =

Briar Creek or Brier Creek may refer to:

== Streams ==
- Brier Creek (Savannah River tributary), in Georgia, U.S.
- Brier Creek (Susquehanna River tributary), in Otsego County, New York, U.S.
- Briar Creek (Susquehanna River tributary), in Pennsylvania, U.S.
  - East Branch Briar Creek
  - West Branch Briar Creek
- Brier Creek (Big Coal River tributary), in West Virginia, U.S.

== Places ==
- Briar Creek, Pennsylvania, U.S.
- Briar Creek Township, Pennsylvania, U.S.

== See also ==
- Battle of Brier Creek, an American Revolutionary War battle in the U.S. state of Georgia
