= Berwick Area Senior High School =

School in Pennsylvania, US

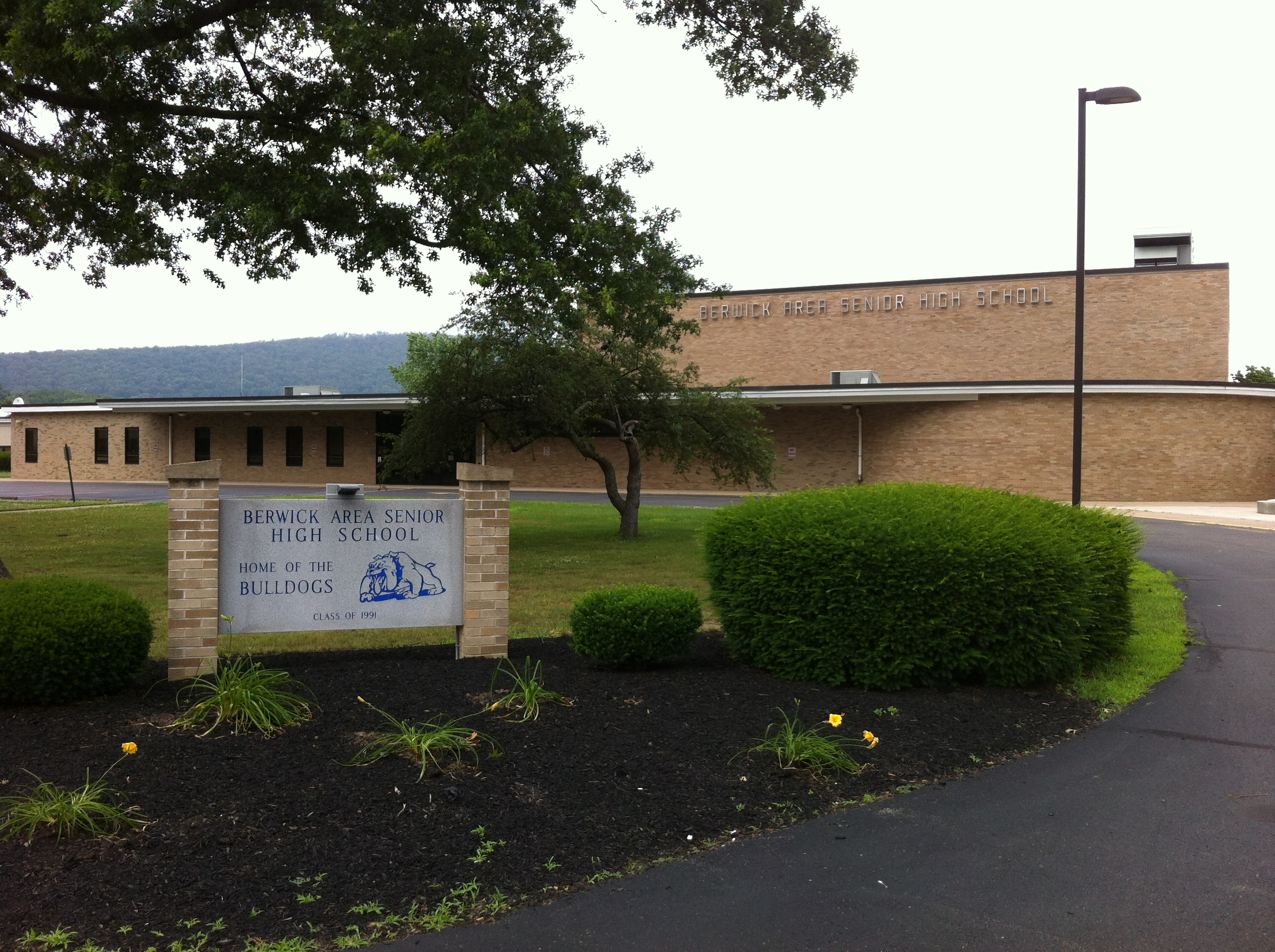

Location
- 1100 Fowler Avenue; Berwick, Columbia County and Luzerne County, Pennsylvania 18603-2300; United States of America; 41.0666°N 76.2295°W

Information
- Status: Open
- School district: Berwick Area School District
- CEEB code: 390290
- Principal: Cheyenne Hinkle
- Staff: 9
- Faculty: 49.91 FTE
- Grades: 9 to 12
- Enrollment: 721 (2023–2024)
- Student to teacher ratio: 14.45
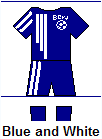
- Color
- Athletics conference: Pennsylvania Interscholastic Athletic Association AAA
- Mascot: Bulldog
- Nickname: Dawgs
- Team name: Bulldogs
- Budget: $11.8M
- Feeder schools: Berwick Middle School
- Pennsylvania School Number: 1605
- Website: https://www.berwicksd.org/o/bhs

Berwick Area Senior High School (also called Berwick Area High School, Berwick High School or BHS) is a small, rural, public high school in Columbia County, in Northeastern Pennsylvania, United States. In Columbia County, the school serves children living in Briar Creek Township Briar Creek, Berwick and Foundryville. It also serves children living in East Berwick, Nescopeck, Nescopeck Township, Hollenback Township and Salem Township in Luzerne County. This is the only public high school in the Berwick Area School District.

== Extracurriculars ==
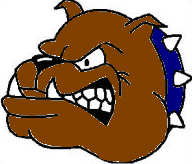
Berwick Bulldog

Berwick Area School District offers a wide variety of clubs, activities and an extensive sports program. It is the only public school district in Columbia County that does not participate in the Pennsylvania Heartland Athletic Conference.

=== Sports ===
Noted for American football especially, the high school team has won the state championship six times. Also, the football team was ranked number 1 nationally by USA Today three times. Berwick won the 2008 PIAA AAA Baseball State Championship. The Bulldogs defeated Somerset 6 to 2 at Blair County Stadium and became the first baseball team in the Wyoming Valley Conference to win the state title. It is the school's first baseball state championship in its history. Also in 2008, the Berwick golf team was the District 2 and District 11 champions. The Berwick wrestling team won back to back District 2 championships in 2007 and 2008, as well as finishing in the top eight PIAA AA Team Championships in 2008.

The school mascot is the Bulldog and the sports teams are called the Bulldogs, or just "Dawgs" for short. School colors and blue and white.

The District funds:

Boys

- American football - AAA
- Baseball - AAA
- Basketball - AAA
- Bowling - AAAA
- Cross country - AA
- Golf - AAA
- Rifle - AAAA
- Soccer - AA
- Swimming and diving - AA
- Tennis - AA
- Track and field - AAA
- Volleyball - AA
- Wrestling - AAA

Girls

- Basketball - AAA
- Bowling - AAAA
- Cross country - AA
- Field hockey - AA
- Golf - AAA
- Rifle - AAAA
- Soccer (fall) - AA
- Softball - AAA
- Tennis - AA
- Track and field - AAA
- Volleyball - AA

== Notable alumni ==
- Joe Colone, professional basketball player for the New York Knicks
- Zehnder Confair, Pennsylvania state senator
- Matt Karchner, former Major League Baseball pitcher
- Jake Kelchner, former professional football quarterback
- Bo Orlando, former NFL safety
- Ron Powlus, former Notre Dame quarterback and college football coach
- Mike Souchak, professional golfer
- Jimmy Spencer, former NASCAR driver and television commentator
- Paul Stenn, NFL offensive tackle
- Kevin Kaminski, former Brown University defensive tackle
- Day Turner, United States Army soldier and Medal of Honor recipient
