= Glen Brook =

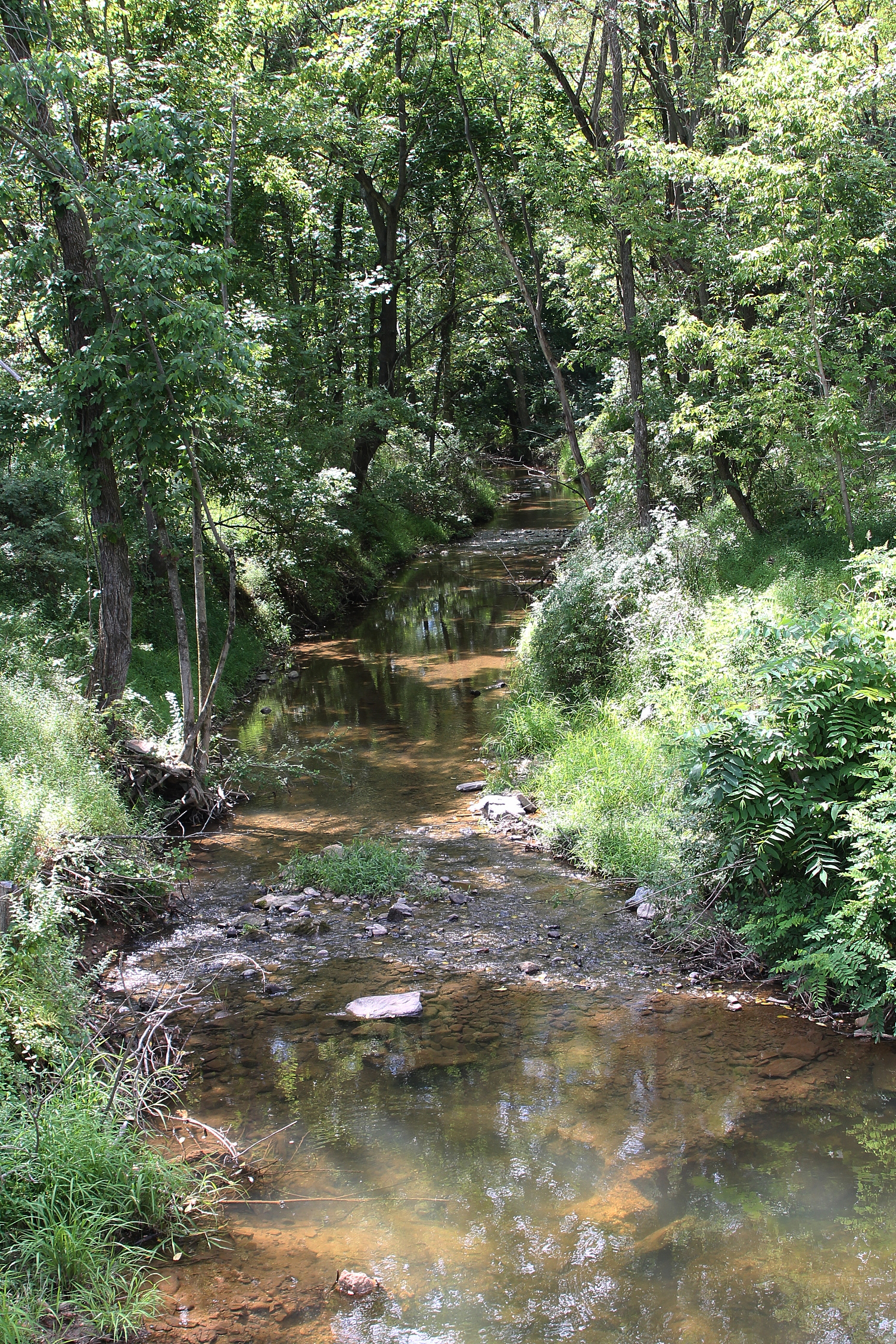
- Glen Brook looking downstream
- Etymology: the fact that it flows through a glen

Physical characteristics
- Source
  - location: Lee Mountain in Salem Township, Luzerne County, Pennsylvania
  - elevation: 960 ft (290 m)
- Mouth
  - location: East Branch Briar Creek in Briar Creek Township, Pennsylvania
  - coordinates: 41°04′01″N 76°15′17″W
  - elevation: 541 ft (165 m)
- Length: 4.7 mi (7.6 km)
- Basin size: 4.96 mi^{2} (12.8 km^{2})
- Discharge
  - average: 4.915 cubic feet per second (0.1392 m^{3}/s) (median)

Basin features
- Progression: East Branch Briar Creek → Briar Creek → Susquehanna River → Chesapeake Bay

Glen Brook is a tributary of East Branch Briar Creek in Luzerne County and Columbia County, in Pennsylvania, in the United States. It is approximately 4.7 miles (7.6 km) long and flows through Salem Township in Luzerne County and Briar Creek Township and Berwick in Columbia County. Its watershed has an area of 4.96 square miles (12.8 km^{2}). A number of dams and reservoirs have been built on the creek and two major bridges cross it. The stream lies over mudstone, siltstone, limestone, sandstone and shale.

Glen Brook is slightly alkaline, with a median pH of 7.37. The median water temperature of the stream is 55.04 °F (12.80 °C). It is inhabited by trout and is considered to be Class A Wild Trout Waters.

== Course ==
Glen Brook begins on the southern side of Lee Mountain in Salem Township, Luzerne County. It flows east-southeast for a short distance before turning southwest and flowing into a valley. After approximately a mile, it enters Briar Creek Township, Columbia County and receives an unnamed tributary. It then turns south-southeast for several tenths of a mile, passing the Glen Brook Number Four Dam. Near the border between Columbia County and Luzerne County, the stream turns southwest and flows into Foundryville, where it makes a sharp turn east and then west, entering Berwick. In Berwick, it turns west-northwest and then southwest, roughly following the northern border of the borough. After several tenths of a mile, the stream leaves Berwick and returns to Briar Creek Township. A short distance later, it reaches its confluence with East Branch Briar Creek.

Glen Brook joins East Branch Briar Creek 2.24 miles (3.60 km) upstream of its mouth.

== Hydrology ==
The discharge of Glen Brook ranges from 0.58 to 60.2 cubic feet per second. The median discharge is 4.915 cubic feet per second. The water temperature of the stream ranges from 34.88 to 72.14 °F (1.60 to 22.30 °C). The median water temperature is 55.04 °F (12.80 °C). The electric conductance of the stream's waters ranges from 68 to 266 milli-siemens, with a median of 96 milli-siemens.

The minimum pH of Glen Brook is 7.06 and the median pH is 7.37. The maximum pH is 7.79. The concentration of total dissolved solids in the stream ranges from 35 to 145 parts per million, with a median of 49 parts per million. The concentration of alkalinity in the waters of the stream is 16 milligrams per liter.

In a visual assessment by the Briar Creek Association for Watershed Solutions, Cabin Run was given a score of 7.0 on a scale of 1 to 10. It scored best (10 on a scale of 1 to 10) on fish barriers and canopy coverage and it scored worst (3 on a scale of 1 to 10) for streambank stability and riparian buffering. Of ten sites in the Briar Creek watershed, this location has a priority rank of 6.

Glen Brook sometimes has high levels of lead and nitrates.

== Geography and geology ==
The elevation near the mouth of Glen Brook is 541 feet (165 m) above sea level. The elevation of the source is just under 960 feet (290 m) above sea level.

The mouth of Glen Brook and the land in its vicinity lies over limestone. The rest of the lower reaches of the watershed are over shale. The middle portion and most of the upper portion are on siltstone. Most of the rest of the watershed's upper reaches lie over mudstone. Its uppermost reaches, however, lie on sandstone.

Soils in the watershed of Glen Brook include the Chenango Series, which is a well-drained and highly acidic silt loam that is found in the stream's lower reaches. A number of other soils are also found in the watershed.

== Watershed ==
The watershed of Glen Brook has an area of 4.96 square miles (12.8 km^{2}). The watershed is the easternmost sub-watershed of the watershed of Briar Creek. At least two dams are on Glen Brook. These are known as the Glen Brook Number One Dam and the Glen Brook Number Four Dam.

A number of bridges cross Glen Brook. One of these is a concrete slab bridge at the Glen Brook Reservoir. It was built in 1937 and is 21.0 feet (6.4 m) long. A bridge carrying State Route 1029 was built over the stream 1 mile (1.6 km) north of Berwick in 1989. This bridge is 41.0 feet (12.5 m) long.

== History and etymology ==
A reservoir was constructed on Glen Brook in 1890. In the early 1900s, the stream supplied water for the Briar Creek Township, the boroughs of Berwick and Nescopeck, and the village of North Berwick via the Berwick Water Company. It was one of three streams that the company used as a water supply.

In the early 1900s, there were two artificial reservoirs on Glen Brook 2 miles (3.2 km) north of Berwick. A third one was under construction around this time.

Glen Brook is so-named because it flows through a glen.

== Biology ==
Trout reproduce naturally on Glen Brook. The stream is considered by the Pennsylvania Fish and Boat Commission to be Class A Wild Trout Waters for both brook trout and brown trout.

== See also ==
- Kashinka Hollow
- List of rivers of Pennsylvania
