= Kashinka Hollow =

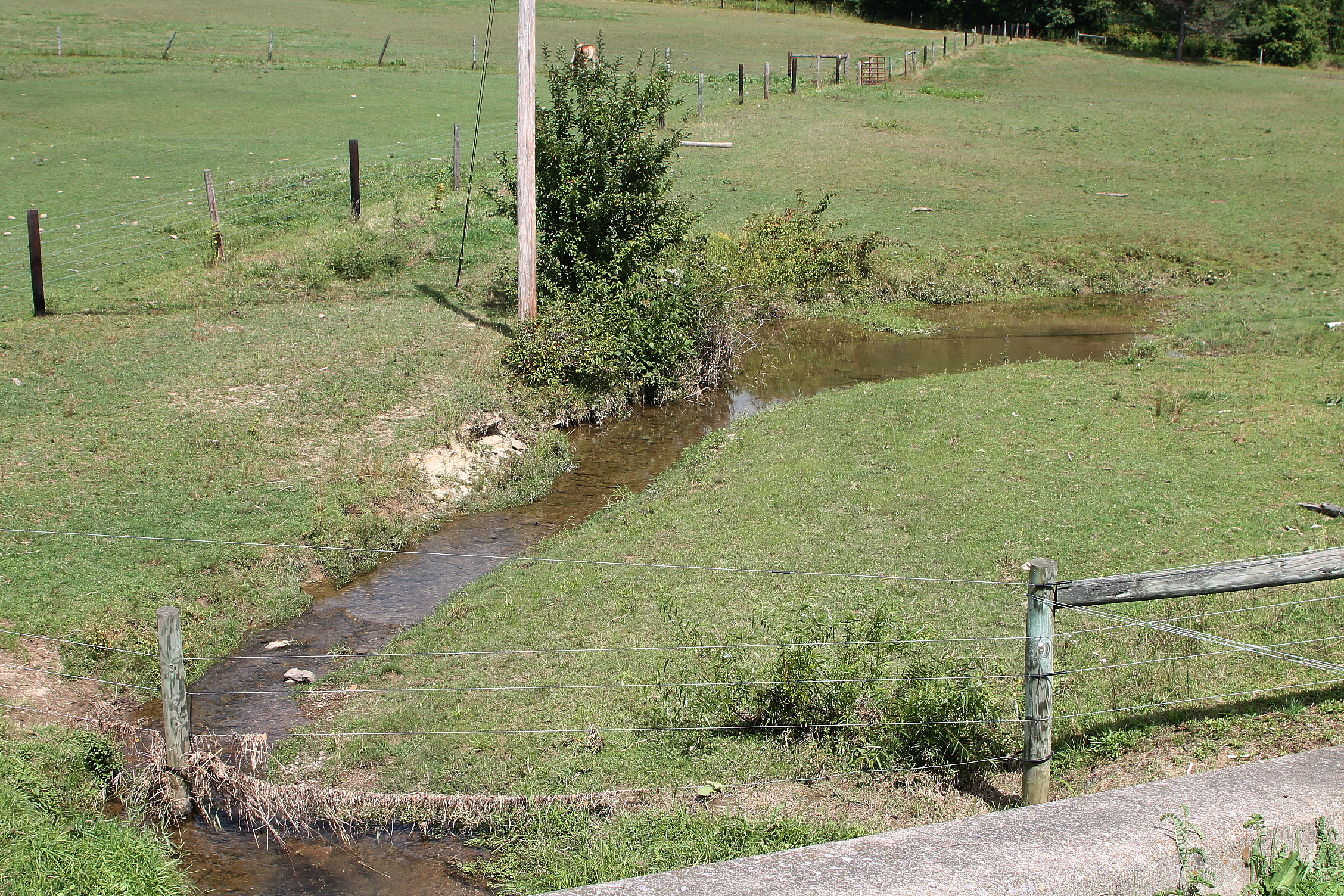
- Kashinka Hollow looking downstream

Physical characteristics
- Source
  - location: northwest of Summer Hill in Briar Creek Township, Pennsylvania
  - elevation: 980 to 1,000 feet (300 to 300 m)
- Mouth
  - location: East Branch Briar Creek in Briar Creek Township, Pennsylvania
  - coordinates: 41°03′52″N 76°16′35″W
  - elevation: 560 to 580 feet (170 to 180 m)
- Length: 3.0 mi (4.8 km)
- Basin size: 2.08 sq mi (5.4 km^{2})
- Discharge
  - average: 2.325 cubic feet per second (0.0658 m^{3}/s) (median)

Basin features
- Progression: East Branch Briar Creek → Briar Creek → Susquehanna River → Chesapeake Bay

Kashinka Hollow is a tributary of East Branch Briar Creek in Columbia County, Pennsylvania, in the United States. It is approximately 3.0 miles (4.8 km) long and flows through Briar Creek Township. Its watershed has an area of 2.08 square miles (5.4 km^{2}). The median pH of the stream is 7.565. It has the lowest visual assessment score of any stream in the Briar Creek watershed. The stream's watershed lies over limestone, shale, siltstone, and mudstone.

Trout inhabit Kashinka Hollow.

== Course ==
Kashinka Hollow begins half a mile northwest of the community of Summer Hill in Briar Creek Township. It flows west for several tenths of a mile before turning south and flowing into a valley for more than a mile. In the valley, the stream flows parallel to Kachinka Hollow Road. Upon exiting the valley, it continues south for a short distance before turning southwest near Martzville. The stream then turns south again and shortly afterwards reaches its confluence with East Branch Briar Creek.

Kashinka Hollow joins East Branch Briar Creek 3.58 miles (5.76 km) upstream of its mouth.

== Hydrology ==
The discharge of Kashinka Hollow ranges from 0.12 to 41.2 cubic feet per second. The median discharge is 2.325 cubic feet per second. The water temperature of the stream ranges from 34.52 to 85.10 °F (1.40 to 29.50 °C), with a median of 57.02 °F (13.90 °C). The stream's highest temperature is the highest recorded water temperature of any stream in the watershed of Briar Creek. The electric conductance of the stream's waters ranges from 88 to 301 milli-siemens, with a median of 147 milli-siemens.

The pH of Kashinka Hollow ranges between 7.14 and 8.73. The median pH of the stream is 7.565. The minimum concentration of total dissolved solids is 34 parts per million and the maximum concentration is 86 parts per million. The median concentration is 43.5 parts per million.

In a visual assessment by the Briar Creek Association for Watershed Solutions, Kashinka Hollow was given a score of 3.4 (the lowest in the Briar Creek watershed) on a scale of 1 to 10. It scored best (10 on a scale of 1 to 10) on fish barriers and it scored worst (1 on a scale of 1 to 10) on streambank stability, riparian buffering, and canopy coverage. Of ten sites in the Briar Creek watershed, this location has a priority rank of 1.

Kashinka Hollow sometimes has high levels of lead and nitrates.

== Geography and geology ==
The mouth of Kashinka Hollow has an elevation of 560 to 580 feet (170 to 180 m) above sea level. The source of the stream has an elevation of 980 to 1,000 feet (300 to 300 m) above sea level.

The mouth of Kashinka Hollow lies over limestone, while the rest of the watershed's lower reaches lie on shale. Most of the watershed's middle and upper reaches lie over siltstone, but the uppermost reaches are on mudstone.

The soil at one location on Kashinka Hollow is of the Watson Series. This soil series is a fairly well-drained and acidic silt loam. A number of other types of soil are also found in the stream's watershed.

== Watershed ==
The watershed of Kashinka Hollow has an area of 2.08 square miles (5.4 km^{2}). The watershed is entirely in Briar Creek Township. Major roads in the stream's watershed include Evansville Road, Summer Hill Road, and Twin Church Road.

== Biology ==
Trout reproduce naturally along the entire length of Kashinka Hollow.

== Recreation ==
The Run for the Diamonds passes through Kashinka Hollow.

== See also ==
- Glen Brook
- List of rivers of Pennsylvania
