= East Branch Briar Creek =

Coordinates: 41°03′10″N 76°16′46″W

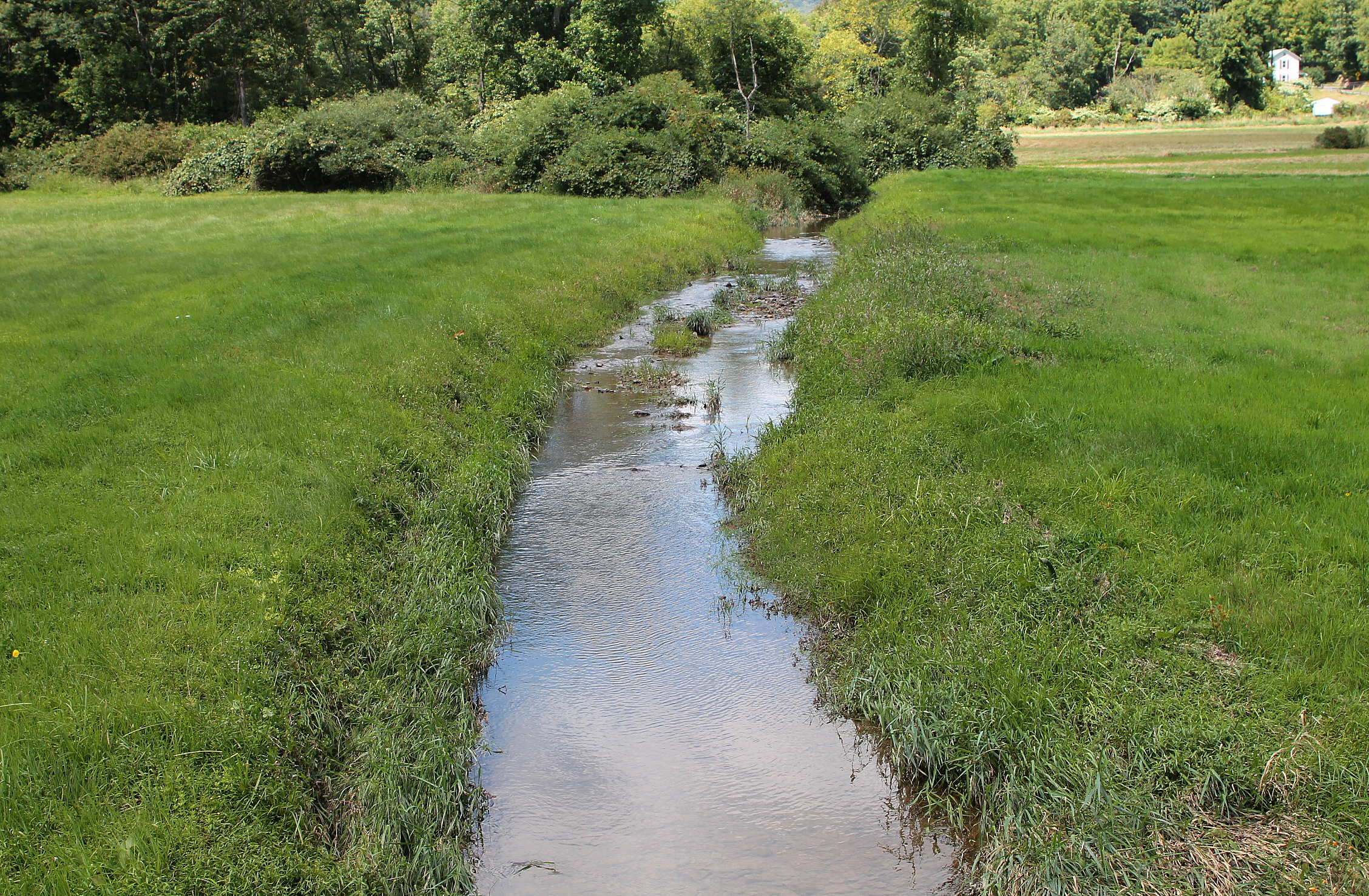
- East Branch Briar Creek in late summer

Physical characteristics
- Source
  - location: lake in Briar Creek Township, Pennsylvania
  - elevation: 1,000 ft (300 m)
- Mouth
  - location: Briar Creek in Briar Creek, Pennsylvania
  - elevation: 499 ft (152 m)
- Length: 9.6 mi (15.4 km)
- Basin size: 15.10 mi^{2} (39.1 km^{2})

Basin features
- Tributaries
  - left: Kashinka Hollow, Glen Brook

East Branch Briar Creek is a tributary of Briar Creek in Columbia County, Pennsylvania, in the United States. It is approximately 9.6 miles (15.4 km) long and flows through Briar Creek Township and the boroughs of Berwick and Briar Creek. The watershed of the creek has an area of 15.10 square miles (39.1 km^{2}). A lake known as Briar Creek Lake is on the creek. The pH of the creek has a median of 6.92 near its headwaters and 7.565 at Briar Creek Lake. The creek's temperature ranges from 32.18 to 78.62 °F (0.10 to 25.90 °C). Rock formations in the watershed include shale, limestone, siltstone, sandstone, and mudstone.

East Branch Briar Creek is designated as a coldwater fishery. It is also partially flanked by forested land.

== Course ==
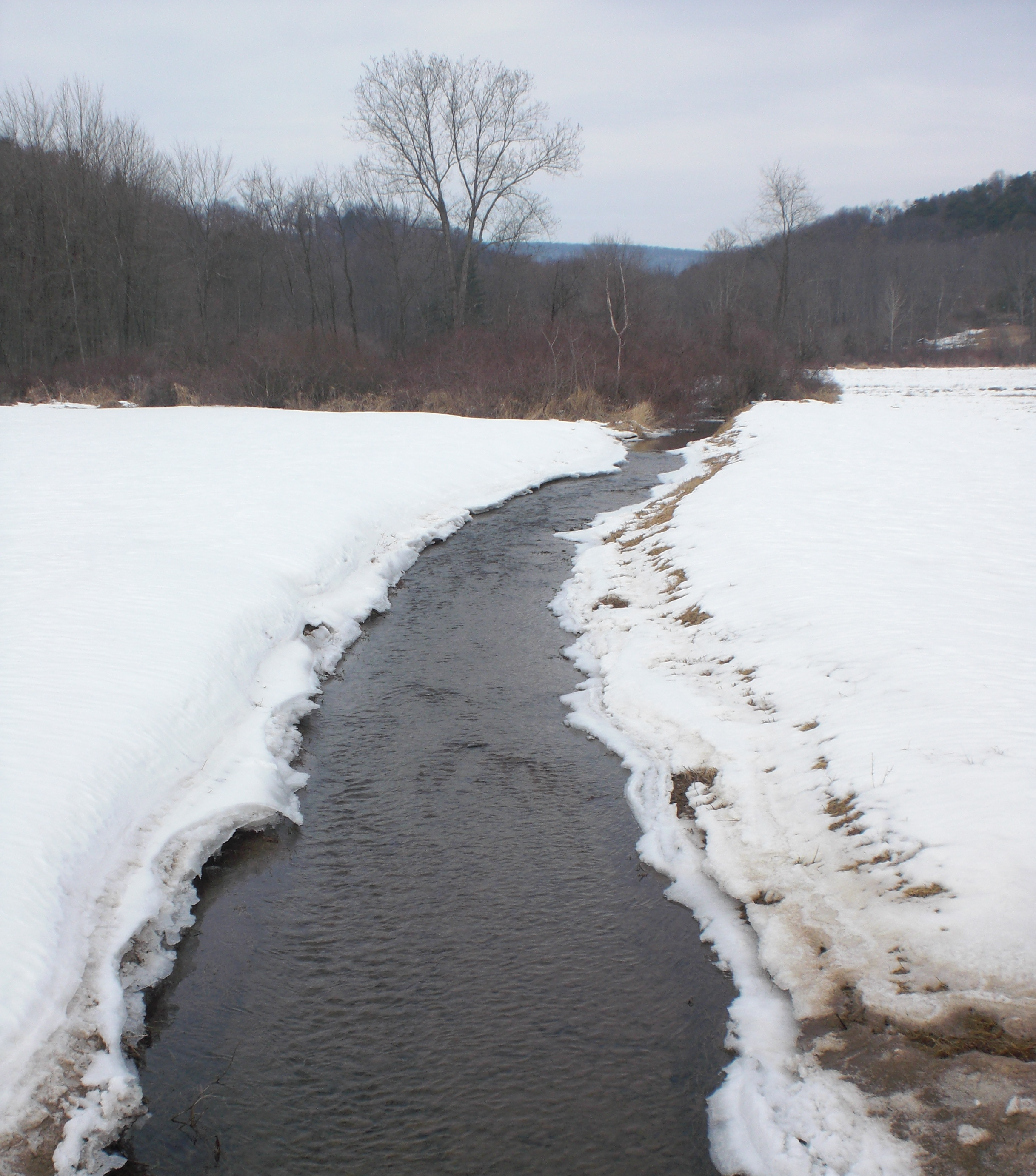
East Branch Briar Creek in late winter

East Branch Briar Creek begins in a lake in Briar Creek Township, immediately south of Lee Mountain. It flows west for a few miles before turning southwest for more than a mile. The creek then turns south-southeast and flows past the community of Evansville. South of Evansville, it turns roughly east and flows through Briar Creek Lake. Further downstream, the creek makes a broad turn west and passes along the outskirts of Berwick. After less than a mile, it enters the community of Briar Creek. Shortly afterwards, the creek reaches its confluence with Briar Creek.

East Branch Briar Creek joins Briar Creek 1.02 miles (1.64 km) upstream of its mouth.

=== Tributaries ===
Tributaries of East Branch Briar Creek include Kashinka Hollow and Glen Brook. Kashinka Hollow joins East Branch Briar Creek 3.58 miles (5.76 km) upstream of its mouth. Its watershed has an area of 2.08 square miles (5.4 km^{2}). Glen Brook joins the creek 2.24 miles (3.60 km) upstream of its mouth. Its watershed has an area of 4.96 square miles (12.8 km^{2}).

== Hydrology ==
The discharge of East Branch Briar Creek in its upper reaches ranges from 0.4 to 10.425 cubic feet per second, with a median of 1.385 cubic feet per second. Near Briar Creek Lake, the discharge of the creek ranges from 0.54 to 11.5 cubic feet per second. The median discharge here is 4.645 cubic feet per second. In the upper reaches of East Branch Briar Creek, its temperature ranges from 32.18 to 71.42 °F (0.10 to 21.90 °C). The median temperature here is 49.73 °F (9.85 °C). Close to Briar Creek Lake, the temperature of the creek ranges between 32.18 and 78.62 °F (0.10 and 25.90 °C). The median temperature here is 50.18 °F (10.10 °C).

Near the headwaters of East Branch Briar Creek, its pH ranges from 6.78 to 7.21, with a median of 6.92. Near Briar Creek Lake, the pH of the creek ranges between 7.14 and 8.73, with a median of 7.565. The creek's concentration of alkalinity is over 20 milligrams per liter. However, this is lower than several other streams in the area. The concentration of total dissolved solids in the creek near its headwaters ranges from 25 to 113 parts per million. The median concentration in this location is 35.5 parts per million. Near Briar Creek Lake, the concentration of total dissolved solids in the creek ranges between 34 and 86 parts per million, with an average of 43.5 parts per million.

In a visual assessment by the Briar Creek Association for Watershed Solutions, the upper reaches of East Branch Briar Creek were given a score of 7.8 on a scale of 1 to 10. Of ten sites in the Briar Creek watershed, this location has a priority rank of 8. However, the visual assessment gave East Branch Briar Creek a score of 3.7 near Briar Creek Lake. This site has a priority rank of 2. From the downstream site of Briar Creek Lake to the mouth of Glen Brook, the creek is considered to be "non-attaining". The causes of impairment in the creek are temperatures and low levels of dissolved oxygen.

East Branch Briar Creek has elevated levels of lead and nitrates.

== Geography and geology ==
The elevation of East Branch Briar Creek near its mouth is 499 feet (152 m) above sea level. The elevation of the creek's source is slightly over 1,000 feet (300 m).

The southern reaches of the watershed of East Branch Briar Creek are over calcareous shale and limestone. The central part of the watershed is on siltstone and shale and the watershed's northern reaches are on mudstone and sandstone.

The soil on East Branch Briar Creek near Briar Creek Lake is of the Holly Series, which is a silt loam. Closer to the creek's source, the Albrights Series is found. This soil series is a gravelly silt loam.

There are large amounts of stream alluvium and colluvium on East Branch Briar Creek.

== Watershed ==
The watershed of East Branch Briar Creek has an area of 15.10 square miles (39.1 km^{2}). Much of the watershed is in Briar Creek Township, but a small part is in Berwick. The eastern part of the watershed is in Salem Township, Luzerne County.

== History ==
East Branch Briar Creek flooded in 1955, causing the communities of Berwick and Foundryville $75,000 in damage. As a response to this and other flooding incidents, the construction of the Briar Creek Lake was planned in 1967.

A woman fell into East Branch Briar Creek and drowned on April 23, 1973.

There are a number of former quarries on the northern side of a ridge that is to the south of East Branch Briar Creek. One of these quarries was used to get stone for making agricultural lime.

== Biology ==
East Branch Briar Creek is designated as a coldwater fishery. Wild trout reproduce naturally in the creek upstream of Briar Creek Lake.

There are forested corridors along East Branch Briar Creek. These are described in the Briar Creek coldwater conservation plan as "very important" to the ecology of the watershed of Briar Creek. The Columbia County Natural Areas Inventory describes these corridors as "some of the most important features in this township [Briar Creek Township]".

== See also ==
- List of rivers of Pennsylvania
- West Branch Briar Creek
