= Briar Creek Reservoir =

- Briar Creek Lake, Briar Creek Park Lake
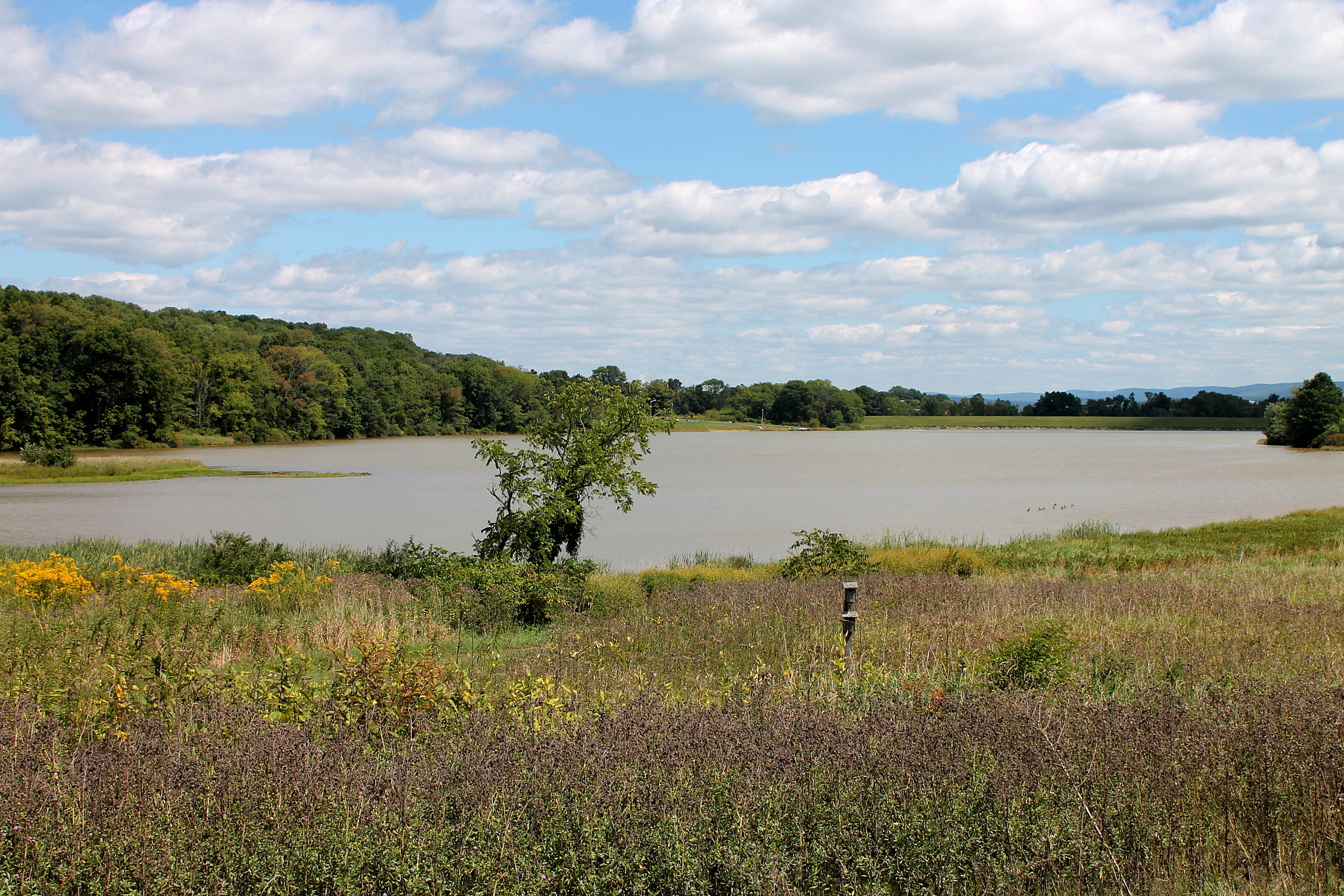
- the Briar Creek Reservoir in August 2014

- Location within Pennsylvania Location within the United States
- Location: Briar Creek Township, Pennsylvania
- Coordinates: 41°04′01″N 76°17′07″W
- Type: reservoir
- Primary inflows: East Branch Briar Creek
- Primary outflows: East Branch Briar Creek
- Built: early 1970s
- Surface area: 51.04 acres (20.66 ha)
- Max. depth: at least 12 to 14 feet (3.7 to 4.3 m)
- Shore length^{1}: 1.4 km (0.87 mi)
- ^{1} Shore length is not a well-defined measure.

The Briar Creek Reservoir (also known as Briar Creek Park Lake or Briar Creek Lake) is a reservoir in Columbia County, Pennsylvania, in the United States. It has an area of 51.04 acres and is located in Briar Creek Township. The lake is situated on East Branch Briar Creek. The lake was constructed in the early 1970s for the purpose of flood control. It is dammed by the Briar Creek Dam. Shale and limestone rocks are found in the lake's vicinity. The lake was electrofished by the Pennsylvania Fish and Boat Commission in 2010. The reservoir is designated as Approved Trout Waters and is stocked with trout. More than a dozen species of fish inhabit it and several bird species are found in its vicinity. The lake is part of the 173-acre Briar Creek Lake Park. Fishing and boating are done in the reservoir.

== Geography ==
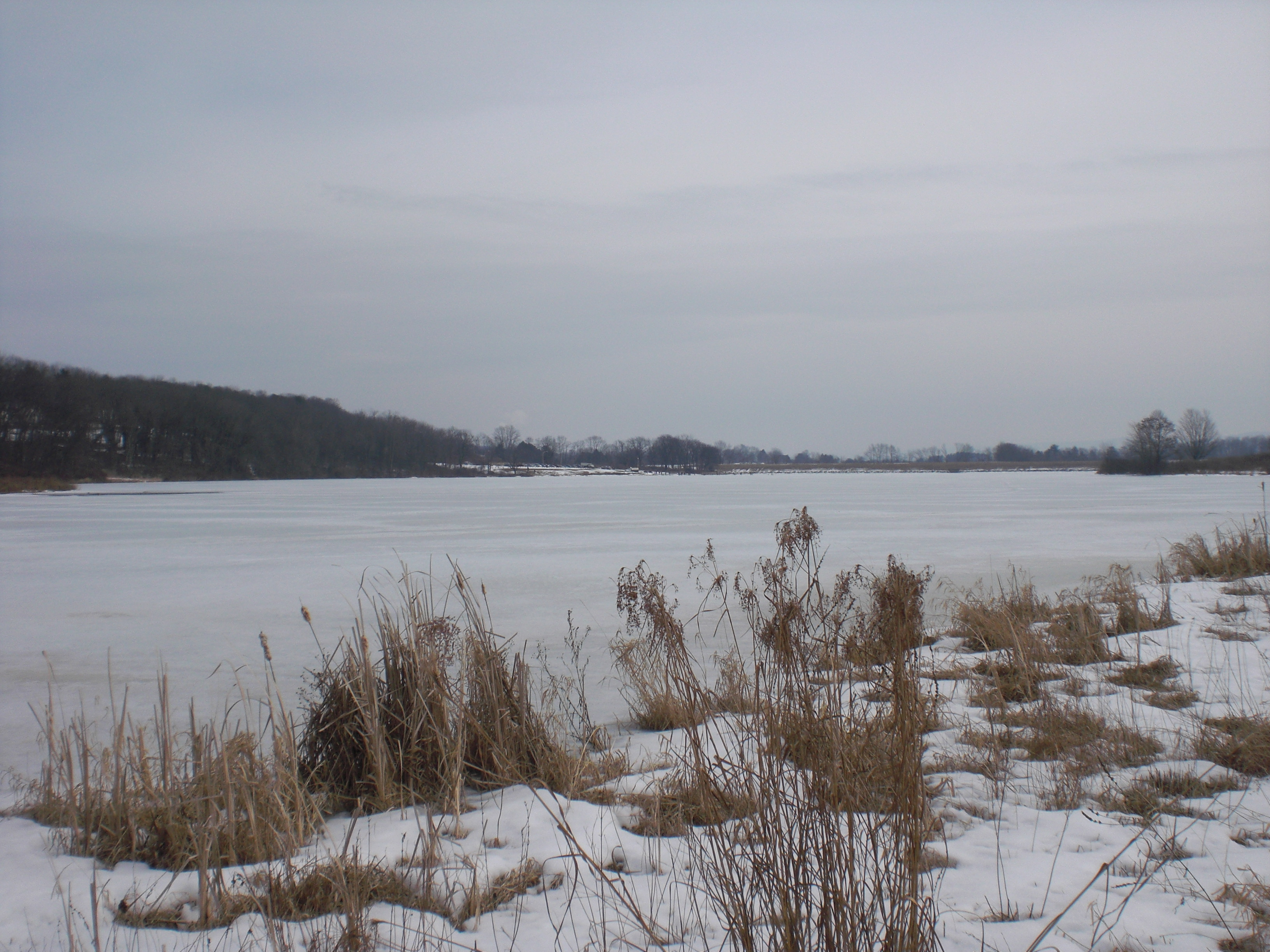
The Briar Creek Reservoir in late winter

The Briar Creek Reservoir is located in East Branch Briar Creek. It is situated in the southeastern part of the creek's watershed. The lake's elevation is slightly under 600 feet (180 m) above sea level. The Briar Creek Reservoir is in the United States Geological Survey quadrangle of Mifflinville. It is located to the west of Berwick, on the Berwick-Evansville Road in southwestern Briar Creek Township.

The Briar Creek Reservoir is resembles a Hill-Land type lake. However, classification is difficult due to its small size and lack of features. The points on the lake's shoreline are "gradual and rounded". The lake has a distinct channel which meanders in a west-northwest to east-southeast direction.

The Briar Creek Reservoir is at least 12 to 14 feet (3.7 to 4.3 m) deep in parts of its eastern half. Various other sites in the lake are at least 2 to 8 feet (0.61 to 2.44 m) deep.

The Briar Creek Reservoir is dammed by a dam known as the Briar Creek Dam. As of 1979, the dam is in good condition, with an "adequate" spillway capacity. The dam is not affected by any significant problems. In 1967, the dam was planned to be made of earth, be 37 feet (11 m) high, and have a volume 155,000 cubic yards.

The Briar Creek Reservoir is almost entirely surrounded by shale. However, a band of limestone occurs to the south of the lake. Much of the land in the lake's vicinity is non-agricultural grassland.

== History ==
The area where the Briar Creek Reservoir is located contained forests and was located near the 19th-century Franklin Fester farmhouse. The area where the reservoir would be was drilled in 1966 to determine if the area was suitable for constructing an impoundment for water. The construction of the lake was initially planned to be done in 1967. However, it was constructed in the early 1970s. Its original purpose was as for flood control. The reservoir was designed by the Soil Conservation Service.

Historically, the Pennsylvania Fish and Boat Commission owned the Briar Creek Reservoir. They leased it to Columbia County. The county was in charge of maintaining the lake. However, in more recent times, the lake is owned by the Commonwealth of Pennsylvania and maintained by the Pennsylvania Fish and Boat Commission.

The Fowlersville Covered Bridge has been situated near the Briar Creek Reservoir since 1986.

The Briar Creek Reservoir was entered into the Geographic Names Information System on August 30, 1990. Its identifier in the Geographic Names Information System is 1195238. The lake was historically known as Evansville Lake.

The Pennsylvania Fish and Boat Commission performed an electrofishing survey in the Briar Creek Reservoir in 2002. The Pennsylvania Fish and Boat Commission also surveyed the reservoir in 2010.

== Biology ==
The Briar Creek Reservoir is stocked with trout by the Pennsylvania Fish and Boat Commission. Fish habitats such as turtle basking platforms and porcupine cribs have been placed in the lake.

More than a dozen species of fish inhabit the Briar Creek Reservoir. The most common include yellow perch, brown bullhead, golden shiner, white crappie, hatchery trout, and bluegill. A 2010 survey by the Pennsylvania Fish and Boat Commission identified 645, 322, 319, 216, 153, and 121 individuals of each species, respectively. Less common fish species in the lake include white sucker, black crappie, largemouth bass, yellow bullhead, and pumpkinseed. The 2010 survey identified 86, 67, 45, 24, and 12 individuals of each species, respectively. Rarer species include common carp, smallmouth bass, hybrid sunfish, and channel catfish. The 2010 survey identified 2, 1, 1, and 1 of each species, respectively.

The largemouth bass in the Briar Creek Reservoir range from 4 to 20.5 inches (10 to 52 cm) in length, with the largest weighing 6.2 pounds (2.8 kg). The lake's black crappies range from 3 to 14 inches (7.6 to 35.6 cm) in length, with the largest weighing 1.6 pounds (0.73 kg). The white crappies range from 3 to 12 inches (7.6 to 30.5 cm) in length. The largest fish in the lake are the common carp, which range from 23 to 25 inches (58 to 64 cm) in length. The smallest are the pumpkinseeds, which range from 2 to 4 inches (5.1 to 10.2 cm) in length.

Various waterfowl inhabit the Briar Creek Reservoir and the surrounding areas. Bald eagles, a threatened species, have also been observed at the lake. Sandhill cranes commonly visit it during migration.

== Recreation ==
The Briar Creek Coldwater Conservation Plan describes the Briar Creek Reservoir as "a centerpiece of watershed activities". A recreational park known as the Briar Creek Lake Park contains the lake and some of the surrounding areas. The park has an area of 173 acres and is named after the lake.

Fishing and boating are done in the Briar Creek Reservoir. However, only boats with electric motors or un-powered boats are permitted in the lake. Un-powered boats may be moored there. The lake has a boat ramp. The Briar Creek Reservoir is designated as Approved Trout Waters and trout fishing is permitted year-round.

There are picnicking opportunities in the vicinity of the Briar Creek Reservoir. Weddings have been performed near the lake.

== See also ==
- List of lakes in Pennsylvania
