= Beach Haven =

Beach Haven or Beachhaven may refer to:

New Zealand

- Beach Haven, New Zealand

United States of America

- Beach Haven, New Jersey
- Beach Haven, Pennsylvania
- Beach Haven West, New Jersey
- North Beach Haven, New Jersey
