= Berwick Area School District =

School district in Pennsylvania, United States

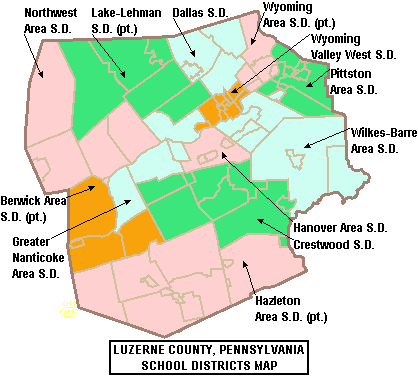
- Location of Berwick Area School District in Luzerne County

Address
- 500 Line Street Berwick, Columbia County, Luzerne County, Pennsylvania, 18603-3325; United States

District information
- Type: Public
- Grades: Preschool - 12th

Students and staff
- District mascot: Bulldogs
- Colors: Blue and white

Other information
- Website: https://www.berwicksd.org/

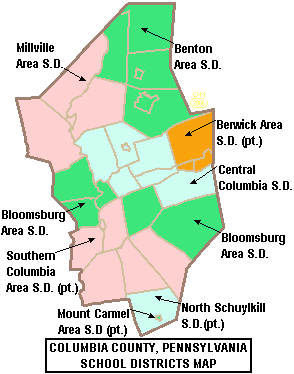
Location of Berwick Area School District in Columbia County

The Berwick Area School District is a midsized, rural, public school district. Berwick Area School District encompasses approximately 101 square miles (260 km^{2}), spanning portions of two central Pennsylvania counties. In Columbia County it covers the Boroughs of Berwick and Briar Creek and Briar Creek Township. In Luzerne County it covers the Borough of Nescopeck and Hollenback Township, Nescopeck Township and Salem Township. According to 2000 federal census data, it served a resident population of 22,622. By 2010, the district's population had declined to 22,332 people. The educational attainment levels for the school district population (25 years old and over) were 82.1% high school graduates and 13.7% college graduates. The district is one of the 500 public school districts of Pennsylvania.

According to the Pennsylvania Budget and Policy Center, 49.8% of the Berwick Area School District's pupils lived at 185% or below the Federal Poverty level as shown by their eligibility for the federal free or reduced price school meal programs in 2012. The per capita income of residents was $16,041 in 2009, while the median family income was $37,684 a year. In the Commonwealth of Pennsylvania, the median family income was $49,501, while the United States median family income was $49,445, in 2010. In Columbia County, the median household income was $42,788. By 2013, the median household income in the United States rose to $52,100.

According to District officials, in school year 2007-08, Berwick Area School District provided basic educational services to 3,176 pupils. It employed: 257 teachers, 300 full-time and part-time support personnel, and 16 administrators According to Berwick Area School District officials, the district provided basic educational services to 3,514 pupils in 2009-10. It employed: 252 teachers, 317 full-time and part-time support personnel, and increased to 17 administrators. Berwick Area School District received $19.7 million in state funding in the 2009-10 school year. Enrollment in the district declined to 3,075 in 2011-12. It employed: 240 teachers, 282 full-time and part-time support personnel, and 15 administrators. The district received $22.6 million in state funding in the 2011-12 school year.

Berwick Area School District operates four schools (Previously five schools): Berwick Area Senior High School, Berwick Middle School, East Berwick Elementary School (Formerly Salem Elementary) and West Berwick Elementary School. Nescopeck Elementary School was closed after the end of the 2023-2024 school year.

== Extracurriculars ==
Berwick Area School District offers a variety of clubs, activities and interscholastic athletics. Berwick is the only public school district in Columbia County that does not participate in the Pennsylvania Heartland Athletic Conference.

=== Sports ===
The district funds:

Boys

- Baseball - AAA
- Basketball- AAA
- Bowling - AAAA
- Cross Country - AA
- Football - AAA
- Golf -AAA
- Rifle - AAAA
- Soccer - AA
- Swimming and Diving - AA
- Tennis - AA
- Track and Field - AAA
- Volleyball - AA
- Wrestling - AAA

Girls

- Basketball - AAA
- Bowling - AAAA
- Cheer - AAAA (added 2014)
- Cross Country - AA
- Field Hockey - AA
- Golf - AAA
- Rifle - AAAA
- Soccer (Fall) - AA
- Softball - AAA
- Swimming and Diving - AA (added 2014)
- Girls' Tennis - AA
- Track and Field - AAA
- Volleyball - AA

Middle School Sports

Boys

- Baseball
- Basketball
- Cross Country
- Football
- Soccer
- Track and Field
- Wrestling

Girls

- Basketball
- Cheer
- Cross Country
- Field Hockey
- Soccer (fall)
- Softball
- Track and Field

- According to PIAA directory July 2012
