= Wheaton Creek =

- Location of the mouth of Wheaton Creek

Location
- Country: United States
- State: New York
- County: Otsego

Physical characteristics
- Source
  - coordinates: 42°25′30″N 75°13′17″W
- Mouth: Brier Creek
  - coordinates: 42°23′58″N 75°13′32″W
  - elevation: 1,220 ft (370 m)

Wheaton Creek is a river in Otsego County, New York. It converges with Brier Creek northeast of Wells Bridge.
