= Foundryville, Pennsylvania =

Unincorporated community in Pennsylvania, US

- Census-designated place
- Location within the U.S. state of Pennsylvania Foundryville (the United States)
- Coordinates: 41°4′37″N 76°14′7″W
- Country: United States
- State: Pennsylvania
- County: Columbia
- Township: Briar Creek

Area
  - Total: 0.55 sq mi (1.42 km^{2})
  - Land: 0.54 sq mi (1.40 km^{2})
  - Water: 0.0077 sq mi (0.02 km^{2})
- Elevation: 636 ft (194 m)

Population (2020)
  - Total: 260
  - Density: 481.5/sq mi (185.91/km^{2})
- Time zone: UTC-5 (Eastern (EST))
  - Summer (DST): UTC-4 (EDT)
- FIPS code: 42-26984
- GNIS feature ID: 1175048

Foundryville is a census-designated place (CDP) in Columbia County, Pennsylvania, United States. It is part of Northeastern Pennsylvania. The population was 260 at the 2020 census. It is part of the Bloomsburg-Berwick micropolitan area.

== History ==
A distillery was built in Foundryville in 1800. A school was built in Foundryville in 1810. A charcoal iron furnace was built in the community in 1835. A foundry was built there in 1847, providing the current name for the community.

== Geography ==
Foundryville is located in eastern Columbia County at 41°4′37″N 76°14′7″W (41.076851, -76.235386). It is in the southeastern corner of Briar Creek Township and is bordered by Berwick to the south, Salem Township in Luzerne County to the east, and rural parts of Briar Creek Township to the north and west. The village is situated around Glen Brook, a southward-flowing tributary of Briar Creek and thence the Susquehanna River.

According to the United States Census Bureau, the CDP has a total area of 0.54 square miles (1.4 km^{2}), of which 0.01 square miles (0.02 km^{2}), or 1.40%, is water.

The Berwick Run for the Diamonds passes through Foundryville.

== Demographics ==
Historical population
Census	Pop.	Note	%±
2020	260		—
U.S. Decennial Census

As of the census of 2000, there were 265 people, 102 households, and 79 families residing in the CDP. The population density was 373.9 inhabitants per square mile (144.4/km^{2}). There were 107 housing units at an average density of 151.0 per square mile (58.3/km^{2}). The racial makeup of the CDP was 99.25% White and 0.75% Asian.

There were 102 households, out of which 29.4% had children under the age of 18 living with them, 62.7% were married couples living together, 7.8% had a female householder with no husband present, and 22.5% were non-families. 18.6% of all households were made up of individuals, and 5.9% had someone living alone who was 65 years of age or older. The average household size was 2.60 and the average family size was 2.95.

In the CDP, the population was spread out, with 23.4% under the age of 18, 9.1% from 18 to 24, 24.2% from 25 to 44, 30.6% from 45 to 64, and 12.8% who were 65 years of age or older. The median age was 39 years. For every 100 females, there were 105.4 males. For every 100 females age 18 and over, there were 93.3 males.

The median income for a household in the CDP was $27,143, and the median income for a family was $24,583. Males had a median income of $21,875 versus $16,250 for females. The per capita income for the CDP was $15,283. About 16.2% of families and 17.4% of the population were below the poverty line, including 22.2% of those under the age of eighteen and none of those sixty five or over.

== Education ==
It is in the Berwick Area School District.
