= Brier Creek (Big Coal River tributary) =

Stream in West Virginia, U.S.

Coordinates: 38°14′23″N 81°46′29″W

Brier Creek is a stream in the U.S. state of West Virginia. It is a tributary of the Big Coal River.

Brier Creek was named for the brier plants near its course.

== See also ==
- List of rivers of West Virginia
