= Beach Haven, Pennsylvania =

Unincorporated community in Pennsylvania, US

- Unincorporated community
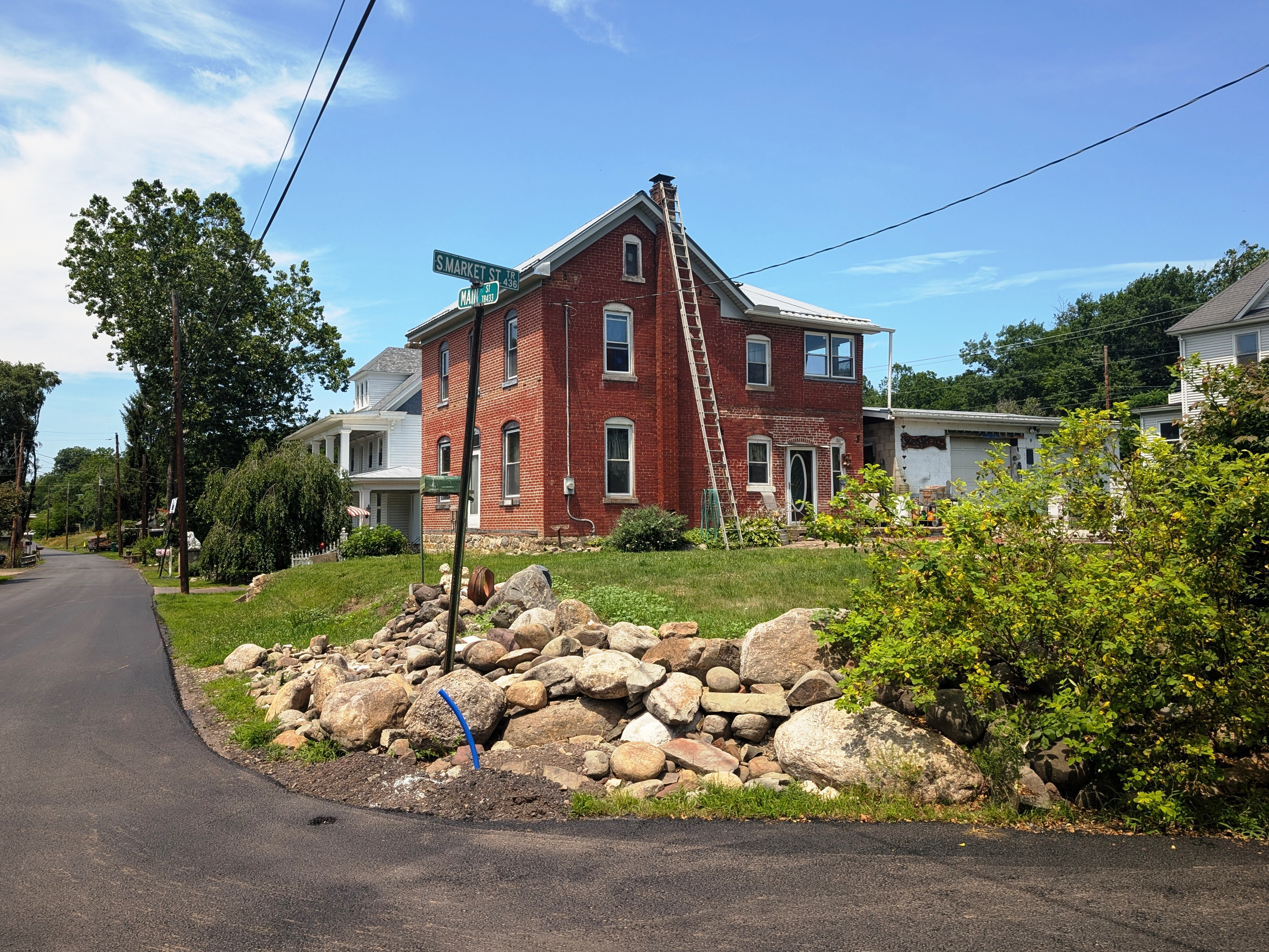
- Brick house in Beach Haven

- Location within Pennsylvania Location within the United States
- Coordinates: 41°04′06″N 76°10′33″W
- Country: United States
- State: Pennsylvania
- County: Luzerne
- Township: Salem
- Elevation: 531 ft (162 m)
- Time zone: UTC-5 (Eastern (EST))
  - Summer (DST): UTC-4 (EDT)
- ZIP code: 18601
- Area codes: 272 & 570
- GNIS feature ID: 1168831

Beach Haven is an unincorporated community in Salem Township, Luzerne County, Pennsylvania, United States. The community is located along the Susquehanna River and U.S. Route 11; it is 3.1 miles (5.0 km) east of Berwick. Beach Haven has a post office with ZIP code 18601, which opened on February 6, 1844.
