= Briar Creek (Susquehanna River tributary) =

Tributary of the Susquehanna River in Columbia County, Pennsylvania

Coordinates: 41.040779°N 76.287875°W

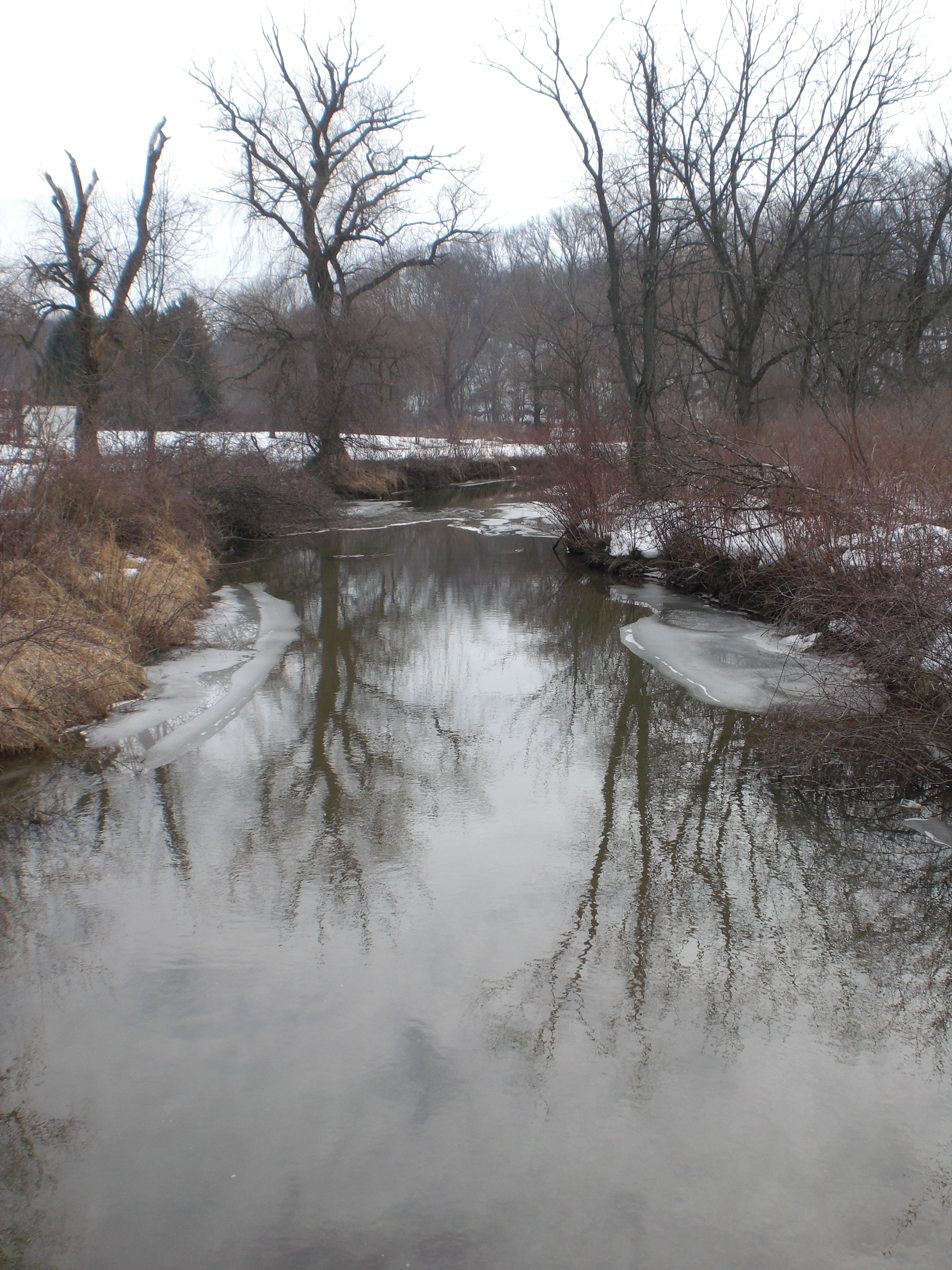
- Briar Creek in Briar Creek Township

- Location within the United States Location within Pennsylvania

Location
- Country: United States
- County: Columbia County, Pennsylvania

Physical characteristics
- Source
  - location: Knob Mountain in Briar Creek Township
- Mouth
  - location: Susquehanna River in Briar Creek
- Length: 7.77 mi (12.50 km)
- Basin size: 33.0 sq mi (85 km^{2})
- Discharge
  - average: 18.5 cubic feet per second (0.52 m^{3}/s) (median, near the mouth)

Basin features
- Tributaries
  - left: East Branch Briar Creek
  - right: West Branch Briar Creek

Briar Creek is a tributary of the Susquehanna River in Columbia County, Pennsylvania, in the United States. It is 7.77 miles (12.50 km) in length. The stream has a watershed area of 33.0 square miles. It flows through Briar Creek Township and the borough of Briar Creek. The area near the creek was originally inhabited by the Lenni Lenape and the Shawanese. European settlers arrived in the 1770s.

Briar Creek has two named tributaries: West Branch Briar Creek and East Branch Briar Creek. The discharge of Briar Creek ranges from 0.06 to 50 cubic feet per second. The water temperature of the creek ranges from 32 to 80.96 °F (0.00 to 27.20 °C). The rock in the watershed mostly consists of sandstone, siltstone, mudstone, limestone, and shale.

There are Pennsylvania State Game Lands in the watershed, as well as a lake known as the Briar Creek Reservoir. In the lake, the most common species of fish is yellow perch.

== Course ==
Briar Creek begins where Knob Mountain, Huntington Mountain, and Lee Mountain meet in western Briar Creek Township. It flows east for a short distance before turning south through a gap in Lee Mountain, briefly descending quite steeply. The course levels out as it leaves the mountain behind and begins flowing through a valley after a short distance. It flows under Pennsylvania Route 93, leaving the valley behind. Soon afterwards, the stream picks up the tributary West Branch Briar Creek and turns southeast. After some distance, it enters the community of Briar Creek and picks up the tributary East Branch Briar Creek. The stream then turns southwest and reaches its confluence with the Susquehanna River near French Island.

=== Tributaries ===
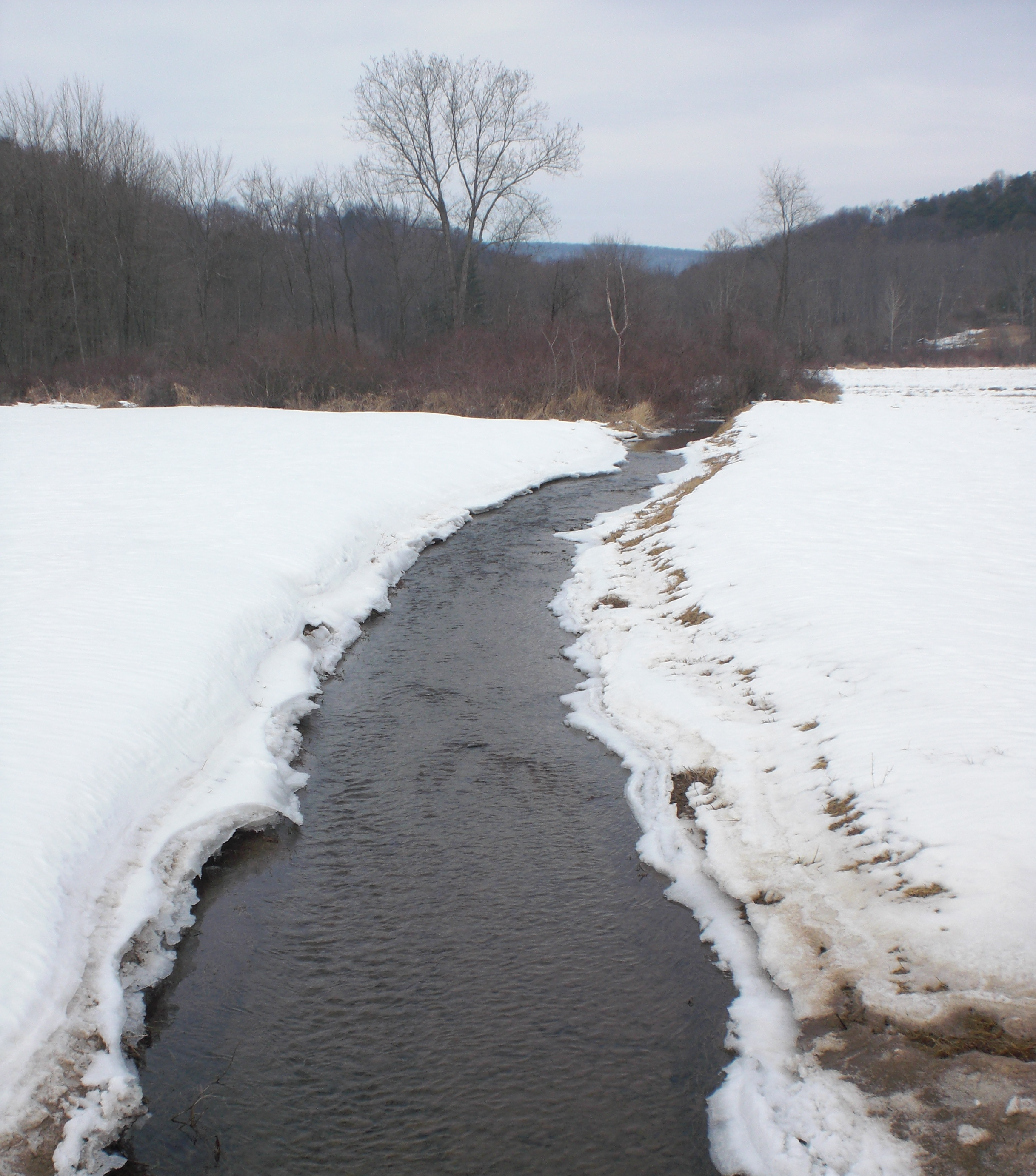
East Branch Briar Creek, a major tributary of Briar Creek

Briar Creek has two named tributaries: East Branch Briar Creek and West Branch Briar Creek. East Branch Briar Creek joins Briar Creek 1.02 miles (1.64 km) upstream of its mouth. It watershed has an area of 15.10 square miles (39.1 km^{2}). West Branch Briar Creek joins Briar Creek 2.74 miles (4.41 km) upstream of its mouth. Its watershed has an area of 12.10 square miles (31.3 km^{2}).

== Hydrology ==
The Briar Creek watershed falls into two of Pennsylvania's ten climate divisions: Division 1 (Pocono Mountains) and Division 5 (Central Susquehanna).

The discharge of Briar Creek about two miles (three kilometers) downstream of its headwaters ranges from 0.06 to 39.1 cubic feet per second (cfs), with a median of 0.685 cfs. Just upstream of West Branch Briar Creek's confluence with the creek, the discharge ranges from 0.63 to 22.1 cfs, with a median of 4.03 cfs. Near the mouth of the creek, the discharge ranges from 4.14 to 50 cfs. There is a median discharge of 18.5 cfs at this point. On East Branch Briar Creek about two miles from its headwaters, the discharge ranges from 0.4 to 10.425 with a median discharge of 1.385 cfs. Near Briar Creek Reservoir, East Branch Briar Creek's discharge has a minimum of 0.54 cfs, a maximum of 11.5 cfs, and a median of 4.645 cfs. On West Branch Briar Creek, the discharge ranges from 0.67 to 31.1 cfs, with a median of 3.2 cfs.

The water temperature of Briar Creek near its source ranges from 35.96 to 64.94 °F (2.20 to 18.30 °C), with a median of 51.44 °F (10.80 °C). This is the highest minimum temperature of any studied location in the watershed. Near West Branch Briar Creek's confluence with Briar Creek, the latter creek has a temperature range of 32 to 67.46 °F (0.00 to 19.70 °C) and a median of 49.28 °F (9.60 °C). This is the lowest minimum temperature of any studied location in the drainage basin. Near its mouth, the temperature ranges from 32.18 to 80.96 °F (0.10 to 27.20 °C). The median temperature is 57.56 °F (14.20 °C). On West Branch Briar Creek, the temperature is a minimum of 35.6 °F (2.0 °C), a median of 57.38 °F (14.10 °C), and a maximum of 71.6 °F (22.0 °C). Two miles downstream of East Branch Briar Creek's headwaters, the median temperature is 49.73 °F (9.85 °C) and the range is 32.18 to 71.42 °F (0.10 to 21.90 °C). Near Briar Creek Reservoir, the water temperature has a minimum of 32.18 °F (0.10 °C), a maximum of 78.62 °F (25.90 °C), and a median of 50.18 °F (10.10 °C).

Briar Creek is slightly alkaline on average. The pH of the creek near its mouth ranges from 7.16 to 8.21, with a median of 7.7. Upstream of West Branch Briar Creek, the creek's pH ranges from 6.15 to 7.69. The median is 7.45. Near the creek's headwaters, the pH ranges from 5.52 to 7.47 and has a median of 6.67. West Branch Briar Creek has a minimum pH of 6.96, a median pH of 7.87, and a maximum pH of 8.31. Not far from its headwaters, East Branch Briar Creek has a pH range of 6.78 to 7.21 and a median pH of 6.92. Near Briar Creek Reservoir, it has a pH range of 7.14 to 8.73 and a median pH of 7.565.

The level of total dissolved solids in Briar Creek near its source has a range of 50 to 161 parts per million (ppm) and a median of 96 ppm. Upstream of West Branch Briar Creek, the range is 12 to 98 ppm and the median is 38 ppm. Near Briar Creek's source, the median is 14 ppm, the minimum is 10 ppm, and the maximum is 89 ppm. The concentration of dissolved solids in the upper reaches of East Branch Briar Creek ranges from parts per 25 to 113 ppm, with a median of 35.5 ppm. Immediately upstream of Briar Creek Reservoir, the concentration ranges from parts per 34 to 86 ppm, with a median of 43.5 ppm.

== Geology and geography ==
The watershed of Briar Creek is located in the ridge and valley physiographic region. The top of Lee Mountain forms a drainage divide between the creek's watershed and another watershed. Several points along Briar Creek and its tributaries have erode with ease or moderate ease. The infiltration capacity of these points is mostly moderate to high.

In the very northern reaches of the Briar Creek watershed, the bedrock is made up of sandstone. South of the sandstone layer, there is a section of the watershed where the bedrock is mudstone. In the central part of the watershed, the bedrock is siltstone. In the southern part of the watershed, the bedrock is mostly shale, including the part of the watershed in Berwick, which it has bedrock of calcerous shale. A small area north of Berwick has limestone bedrock.

There are a number of types of soil in the Briar Creek watershed. One of these is the Holly Series, which is an acidic silt loam. Places in the watershed where the Holly Series is found include Briar Creek about one mile upstream of the mouth of West Branch Briar Creek, West Branch Briar Creek about 1.5 miles (2.4 km) upstream of its mouth, and near Briar Creek Reservoir. Another soil series in the drainage basin is the Buchanan Series, an acidic stony loam. Places it is found include Briar Creek about two miles downstream of its headwaters. The Albrights Series, a silt loam with gravel, is also found in the watershed, in such places as East Branch Briar Creek two miles downstream of its headwaters. The Chenango Series is a silt loam that occurs, among other places, in the southeastern and southern corners of the watershed. The Watson Series and the Middlebury Series (sandy and silty loams, respectively) are found in parts of the central part of the Briar Creek watershed. The Zipp Series is a somewhat acidic silt loam that occurs in places such as the Cabin Run watershed.

Briar Creek is between 25 and 30 feet (7.6 and 9.1 m) wide. Its tributary West Branch Briar Creek is about 15 feet (4.6 m) wide.

== Watershed ==
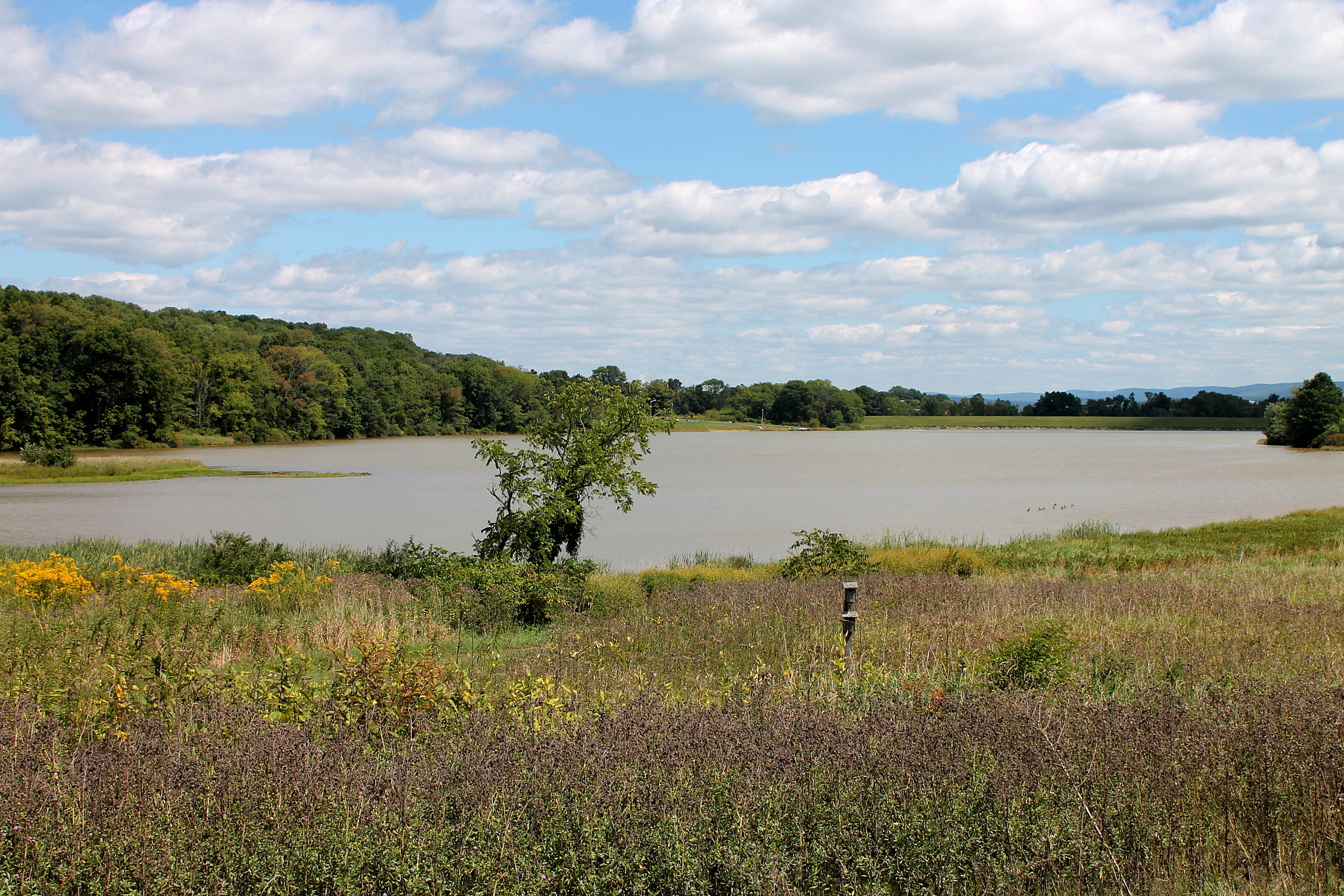
Briar Creek Reservoir in August

The Briar Creek watershed has an area of 33.0 square miles (85 km^{2}). It is located in Columbia County and Luzerne County. There are six communities that are fully or partly within the watershed: Briar Creek, Briar Creek Township, North Centre Township, Orange Township, and Berwick in Columbia County and Salem Township in Luzerne County. A total of 1.04 square miles are located in Briar Creek, 16.48 are located in Briar Creek Township, 12.04 are located in North Centre Township, 0.22 are located in Orange Township, 1.24 are in Berwick, and 1.94 are in Salem Township. As compared to other watersheds with the same size and land use, the Briar Creek watershed has been given a B rating by the Pennsylvania Department of Environmental Protection. According to the Briar Creek Coldwater Conservation Plan, this indicates that "residents in the watershed are working to improve and/or conserve resources in the area".

A total of 8678 acres, or 41% of the Briar Creek watershed is forested land. Much of this is on Knob Mountain or belongs to the Pennsylvania State Game Lands Number 55. A total of 7210 acres, or 34% of the watershed, is farmland and 1143 acres, or 6% of the watershed, is urban land. Most of this is in the southeastern part of the watershed. A total of 3984 acres, or 19% of the land in the watershed, is non-agricultural grassland.

There are approximately 44.23 miles (71.18 km) of streams in the Briar Creek watershed. The watershed is made up of seven smaller watersheds, or sub-watersheds. A 53-acre lake known as the Briar Creek Reservoir is also situated on a tributary to Briar Creek. The lake, which is manmade, was constructed for flood control purposes in the early 1970s. It is also used for fishing and boating.

== History and etymology ==
Briar Creek was historically known as the "Kawanishoning" to the area's Native Americans. This name was a Lenni Lenape word for "sweet briar". However, the creek was also referred to as "Kawanishoning Creek" by white soldiers and explorers during the time of the American Revolutionary War. By 1770, some maps began referring to the creek as Bryar Creek, which became the more common name by the end of the eighteenth century and remained so as late as 1840. However, the spelling gradually changed to Brier Creek and then Briar Creek.

Up to approximately 1770, the area around Briar Creek was inhabited by the Lenni Lenape Indians. They built villages on the banks of the creek. The Shawanese also had a village at the mouth of the creek. In the 1770s, European settlers arrived in the area. The White family from New Jersey was among the first families of settlers to arrive in the Briar Creek valley. The Briar Creek area was one of the first places in Columbia County to be settled, on account of the high level of fertility of the land. The area around Briar Creek was part of Northumberland County in the late 1700s. In 1799, Samuel Ely was granted a patent from the state of Pennsylvania for 307 acres of land on Briar Creek known as "Manheim". In 1806, he gained a 426-acre tract of land on the creek. This tract was known as "Quincy". Ely's four sons inherited the land.

In the beginning of the 1800s, a number of mills were built on tributaries of the creek. A number of other industries were established in the watershed in the early 1800s, including a sawmill, a woolen mill, an iron furnace, and a tannery. In the second half of the 1800s, railroads began to be built in the watershed. Heavy industries and fisheries also began to appear in the area around this time.

By 1911, two dams had been constructed on Glen Brook (a subtributary of Briar Creek) in Briar Creek Township two miles north of Berwick. In 1911, the first dam, known as Number One, had a capacity of 15 million gallons. The second dam, known as Number Two, had a capacity of 7.5 million gallons. In 1911, a third dam was under construction several hundred feet downstream of the two aforementioned dams. It was intended to have a capacity of 23.8 million gallons.

The Briar Creek Watershed Association is a watershed association for Briar Creek. It was formed in 2006.

== Biology ==
Pennsylvania State Game Lands#55 are in the Briar Creek watershed. The Pennsylvania Department of Conservation and Natural Resources has designated the Briar Creek watershed as "place of ecological importance".

More than 90 species of birds breed within the Briar Creek watershed. These include several species of ducks, flycatchers, herons, plovers, rails, and swallows, as well as one species of kingfisher and one species of crane. Bald eagles, sandhill cranes, and several species of waterfowl have been observed on Briar Creek Reservoir. Mammals living in the watershed include minks, muskrats, and short-tailed shrews, and the endangered Indiana bat. Fish, damselflies, mayflies, and other macroinvertebrates also inhabit the watershed. A total of 28 species of fish were observed by the Pennsylvania Fish and Boat Commission in the watershed in 2006. Earlier, 34 species were observed.

In April 2010, the Pennsylvania Fish and Boat Commission performed a survey of the fish species residing in Briar Creek Reservoir. The most common fish observed were yellow perch (645 specimens), brown bullhead (322 specimens), golden shiner (319 specimens), white crappie (216 specimens), hatchery trout (153 specimens), and bluegill (121 specimens). The largest fish observed were common carp, of which two specimens between 23 and 25 inches (58 and 64 cm) were observed. The smallest fish were pumpkinseed, of which 12 specimens between two and four inches (five and ten centimeters) were observed. Minnows also live in West Branch Briar Creek.

== Recreation ==
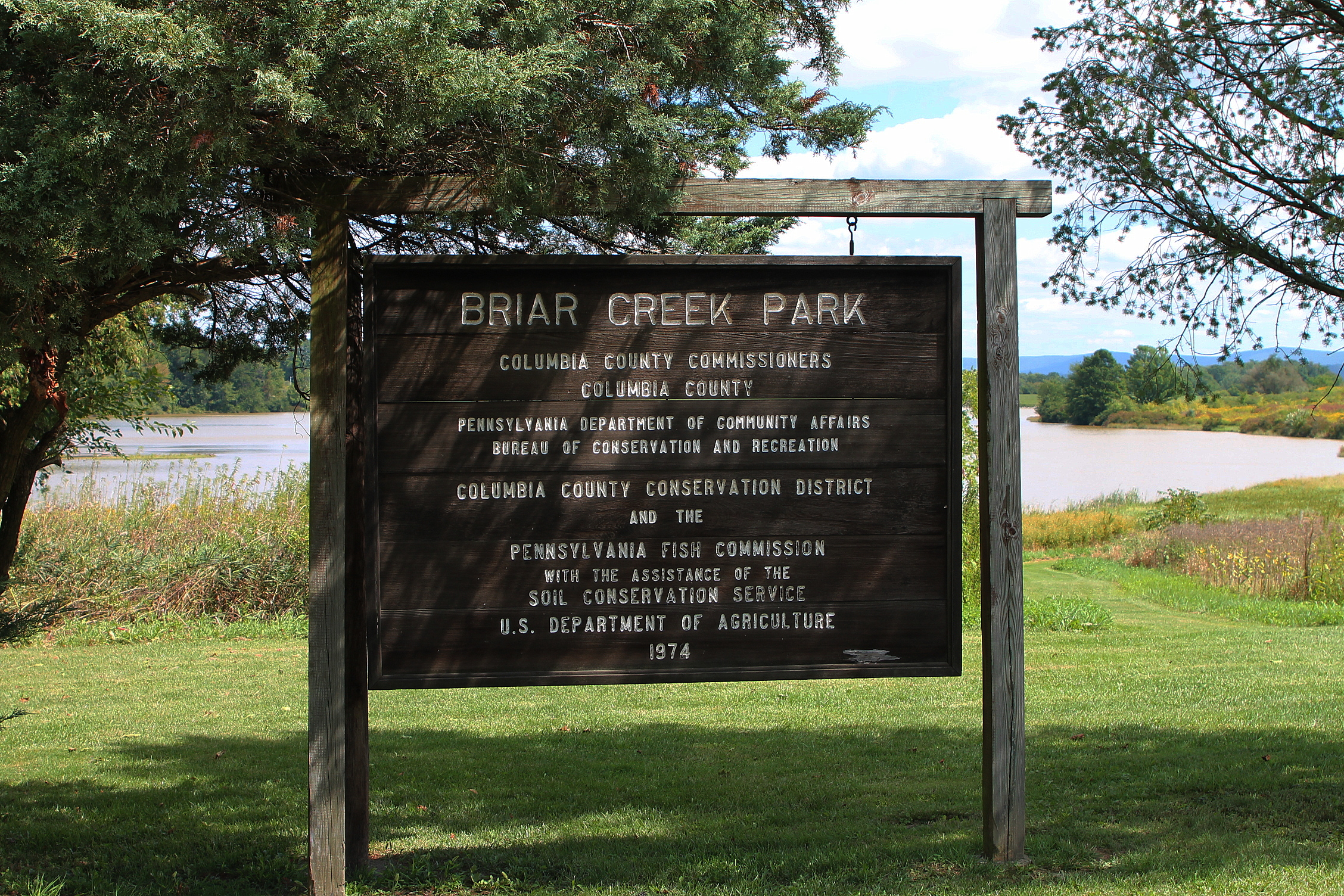
Sign for the Briar Creek Lake Park

Briar Creek Reservoir is located in the Briar Creek watershed, on East Branch Briar Creek. It is owned by the Pennsylvania Fish and Boat Commission and Columbia County. It was originally constructed to control floods, but most recreational activities in the watershed take place at this lake. These include fishing, picnicking, and weddings. There are also Pennsylvania State Game Lands in the watershed. The waters of Briar Creek are approved trout waters and the stream is stocked with trout.

== See also ==
- Tenmile Run, next tributary of the Susquehanna going downstream
- Nescopeck Creek, next tributary of the Susquehanna going upstream
- List of rivers of Pennsylvania
