= Brier Creek (Susquehanna River tributary) =

River in Otsego County, New York

- Location of the mouth of Brier Creek

Location
- Country: United States
- State: (New York (state)) New York
- County: Otsego

Physical characteristics
- Source
  - coordinates: 42°27′45″N 75°15′02″W
- Mouth: Susquehanna River
  - coordinates: 42°22′08″N 75°12′52″W
  - elevation: 1,017 ft (310 m)

Basin features
- Tributaries
  - left: Wheaton Creek

Brier Creek is a river in Otsego County, New York. It converges with the Susquehanna River west-southwest of Otego.
