= Run for the Diamonds =

Annual foot race in Pennsylvania, US

Coordinates: 41.06103°N 76.23893°W

Berwick Run for The Diamonds is a nine-mile foot race starting and ending on Market Street in downtown Berwick, Pennsylvania. It has been held every year on Thanksgiving Day since 1908.

The first race had only 13 participants. The course has remained essentially unchanged since 1908, running up a very challenging hill and through the countryside of Summerhill. No women competed officially until 1972 when two women ran. The one hundredth running of the annual event was held in 2009. It was canceled twice due to World War I in 1918 and 1919, but despite World War II & the COVID-19 pandemic, the race went on.

The race was called the "Berwick Marathon" until the 1970s and 1980s. But since the race is too short to qualify as a marathon, and winners receive diamonds as part of their prize, the name was changed to "Run for the Diamonds".

The number of participants has grown dramatically, from about 100 runners in 1973 to 1,985 runners in 2009. The course record of 43:21 was set in 1980 by Pete Pfitzinger.

== Course ==
The race starts on Market Street in Berwick and goes north along that street for about a mile before turning onto Summerhill Road, which becomes Foundryville Road as it goes through the municipality of Foundryville. After passing through Foundryville around mile 2, it goes up a very long and steep hill known as "The Hill". After cresting the hill around mile 3.5, it heads mostly downhill to the halfway point where it turns onto Kachinka Hollow Road and continues descending to Martzville Road at mile 7. The course follows Martzville Road back to Market Street, and then after a mile on Market Street. However, from 1946 to 1954, the race finished at Crispin Field in Berwick.
