= Briar Creek, Pennsylvania =

Borough in Pennsylvania, US

- Borough
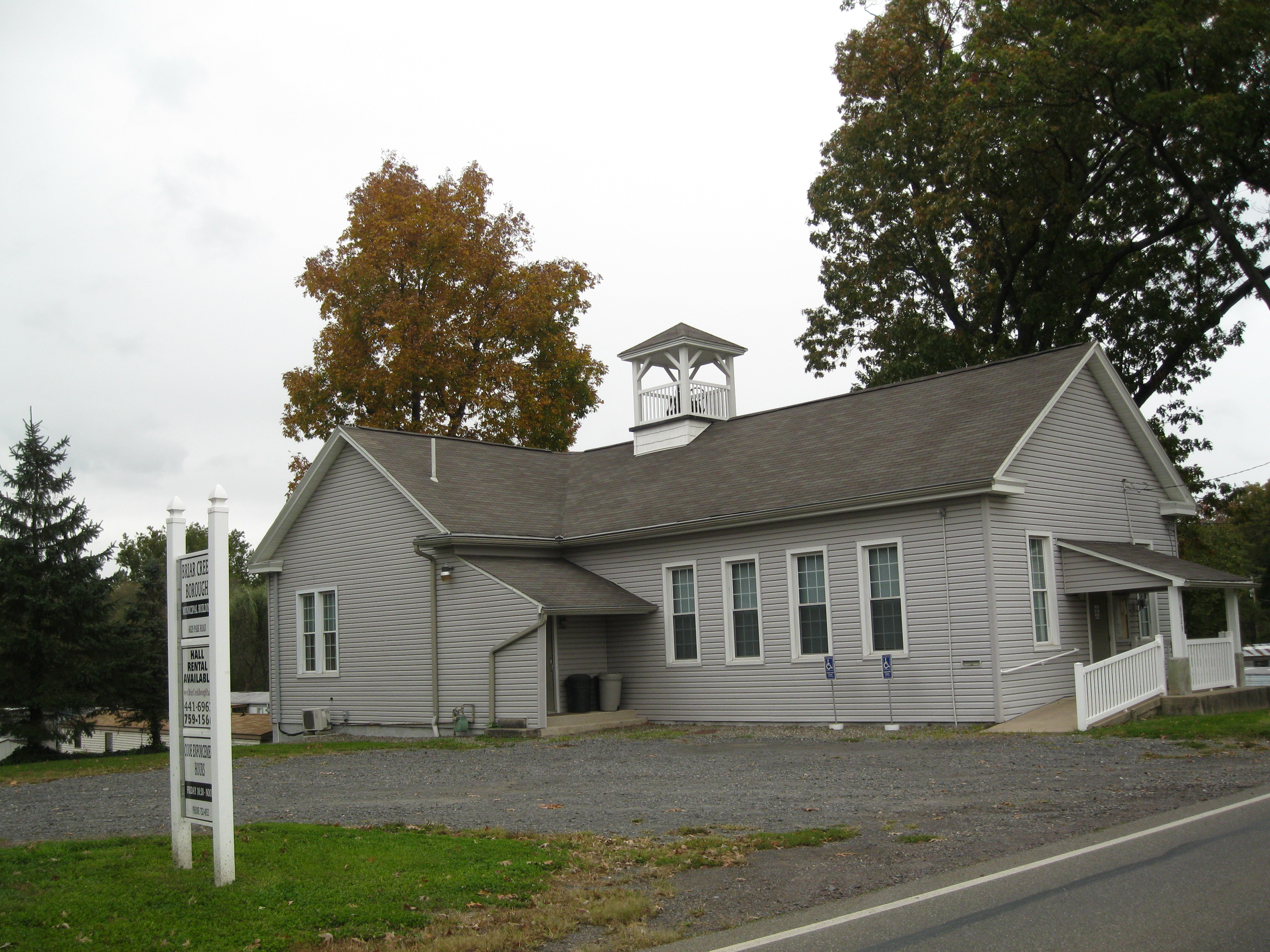
- The borough hall in October 2012

- Location of Briar Creek in Columbia County, Pennsylvania.

- Location of Columbia County in Pennsylvania

- Location in Pennsylvania Briar Creek (the United States)
- Coordinates: 41°03′10″N 76°16′42″W
- Country: United States
- State: Pennsylvania
- County: Columbia
- Incorporated: 1917

Government
  - Type: Borough Council

Area
  - Total: 1.84 sq mi (4.77 km^{2})
  - Land: 1.65 sq mi (4.28 km^{2})
  - Water: 0.19 sq mi (0.49 km^{2})
- Elevation: 495 ft (151 m)

Population (2020)
  - Total: 597
  - Density: 361.6/sq mi (139.61/km^{2})
- Time zone: UTC-5 (Eastern (EST))
  - Summer (DST): UTC-4 (EDT)
- Area code: 570
- FIPS code: 42-08472
- Website: http://briarcreekboro.org/

Briar Creek is a borough in Columbia County, Pennsylvania, United States. It is part of Northeastern Pennsylvania. The population was 597 at the 2020 census. It is part of the Bloomsburg-Berwick micropolitan area.

== Geography ==
Briar Creek is located in eastern Columbia County at 41°3′10″N 76°16′42″W (41.052639, -76.278369), on the north side of the Susquehanna River. It is bordered to the east by Berwick, to the north by Briar Creek Township, to the west by South Centre Township, and to the south, across the Susquehanna, by Mifflin Township. Mifflinville is across the river southwest of Briar Creek, accessible by Market Street Bridge west of the borough limits.

According to the U.S. Census Bureau, the borough of Briar Creek has a total area of 1.9 square miles (4.8 km^{2}), of which 1.7 square miles (4.3 km^{2}) is land and 0.2 square miles (0.5 km^{2}), or 10.38%, is water. Briar Creek is served by U.S. Route 11, which follows the Susquehanna River, leading east into Berwick and southwest 10 miles (16 km) to Bloomsburg, the county seat. Although Briar Creek is one of the smaller boroughs in Pennsylvania, it is home to many acres of farmland, a golf course, and a lake. A creek with the same name as the borough flows through Briar Creek.

== Demographics ==
Historical population
Census	Pop.	Note	%±
1920	295		—
1930	249		−15.6%
1940	316		26.9%
1950	348		10.1%
1960	399		14.7%
1970	456		14.3%
1980	637		39.7%
1990	616		−3.3%
2000	651		5.7%
2010	660		1.4%
2020	597		−9.5%
2021 (est.)	597	Steady	0.0%

=== 2020 census ===
Briar Creek racial composition
Race	Num.	Perc.
White	554	92.8%
Black or African American	6	1.0%
Native American	0	0.0%
Asian	6	1.0%
Pacific Islander	0	0.0%
Other/Mixed	31	5.2%
Hispanic or Latino	21	3.5%

As of the 2020 United States census, there were 597 people residing in the borough. The population density was 361.8 inhabitants per square mile (139.7/km^{2}), with 331 housing units at an average density of 200.6 per square mile (77.5/km^{2}).

=== 2010 census ===
As of the 2010 United States census, there were 660 people, 276 households, and 142 families residing in the borough. The population density was 400 inhabitants per square mile (150/km^{2}), with 314 housing units at an average density of 190.4 per square mile (73.5/km^{2}). The racial makeup of the borough was 643 (97.4%) white, 2 (0.3%) African American, 1 (0.2%) Native American, 3 (0.5%) Asian, 0 (0.0%) Pacific Islander, and 11 (1.6%) of two or more races. 4 people (0.6%) of any race were Hispanic or Latino.

There were 276 households, out of which 63 (22.8%) had children under the age of 18 living with them, 97 (35.1%) were married couples living together, 33 (12.0%) had a female householder with no husband present, and 12 (4.3%) had a male householder with no wife present. There were 23 (8.3%) unmarried opposite-sex partnerships and 1 (7.6%) unmarried same-sex partnership. 134 (48.6%) households were non-families. 117 (42.4%) of all households were made up of individuals, and 85 (30.8%) had someone living alone who was 65 years of age or older. The average household size was 2.14, and the average family size was 2.94. 12 people (4.3%) lived in non-institutionalized group quarters, and 58 (21.0%) were institutionalized.

The population was spread out, with 116 people (17.6%) under the age of 18, 47 (7.1%) aged 18 to 24, 131 (19.8%) aged 25 to 44, 153 (23.2%) aged 45 to 64, and 213 (32.3%) who were 65 years of age or older. The median age was 43.9 years. For every 100 females, there were 78.4 males.

=== 2000 census ===
As of the census of 2000, there were 651 people, 250 households, and 162 families residing in the borough. The population density was 408.2 inhabitants per square mile (157.6/km^{2}). There were 280 housing units at an average density of 175.6 per square mile (67.8/km^{2}). The racial makeup of the borough was 98.00% White, 0.15% African American, 0.61% Asian, 0.31% from other races, and 0.92% from two or more races. Hispanic or Latino of any race were 0.46% of the population.

There were 250 households, out of which 25.2% had children under the age of 18 living with them, 46.8% were married couples living together, 12.0% had a female householder with no husband present, and 35.2% were non-families. 30.0% of all households were made up of individuals, and 11.2% had someone living alone who was 65 years of age or older. The average household size was 2.38 and the average family size was 2.91.

In the borough the population was spread out, with 20.7% under the age of 18, 8.1% from 18 to 24, 26.3% from 25 to 44, 21.0% from 45 to 64, and 23.8% who were 65 years of age or older. The median age was 41 years. For every 100 females, there were 86.0 males. For every 100 females age 18 and over, there were 81.7 males.

The median income for a household in the borough was $23,594, and the median income for a family was $27,833. Males had a median income of $22,150 versus $19,583 for females. The per capita income for the borough was $13,009. About 11.6% of families and 17.6% of the population were below the poverty line, including 31.3% of those under age 18 and 15.3% of those age 65 or over.

== Education ==
It is in the Berwick Area School District.
