= Salem Township, Luzerne County, Pennsylvania =

Township in Pennsylvania, US

Coordinates: 41°08′00″N 76°09′59″W

- Township
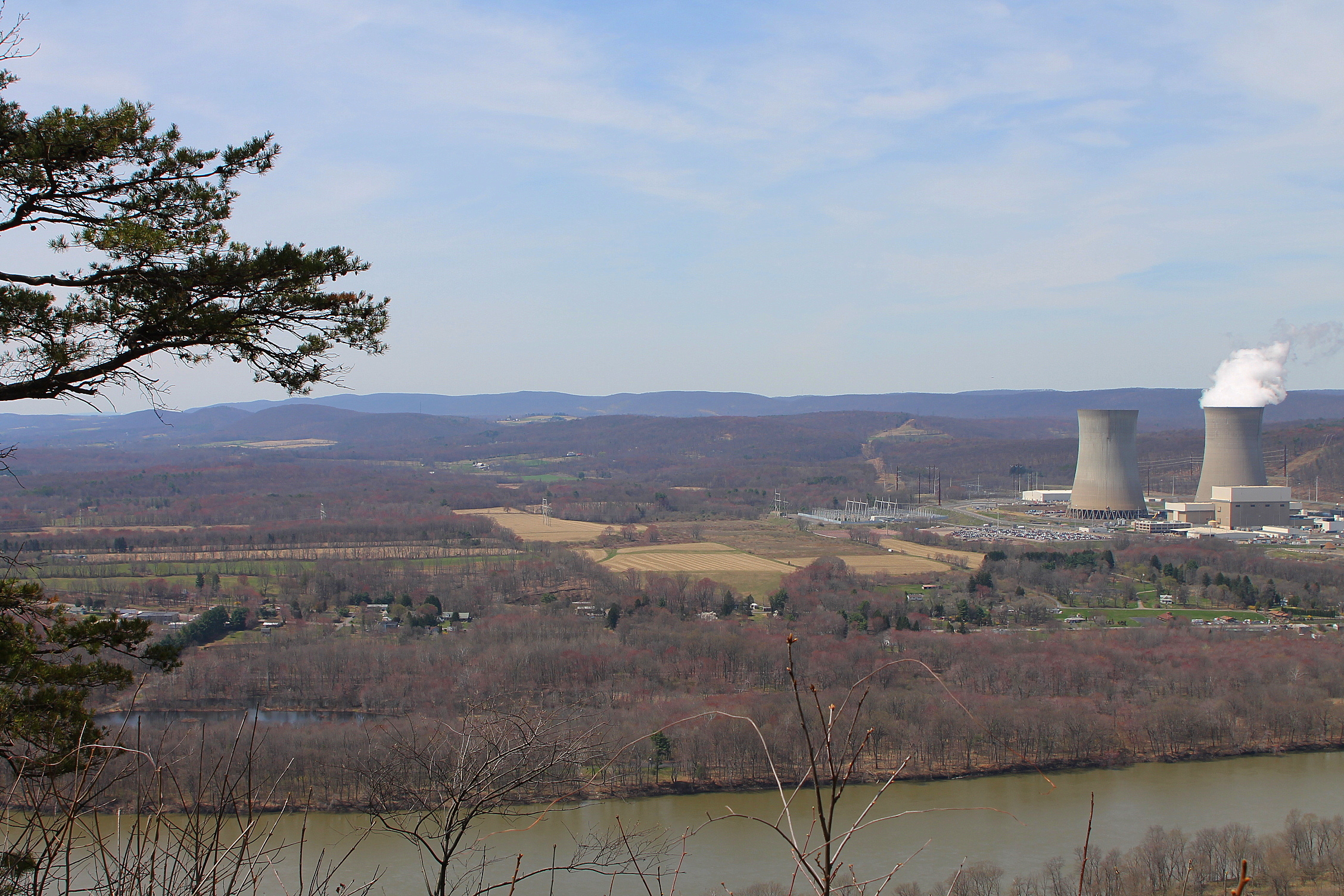
- Salem Township as seen from Council Cup

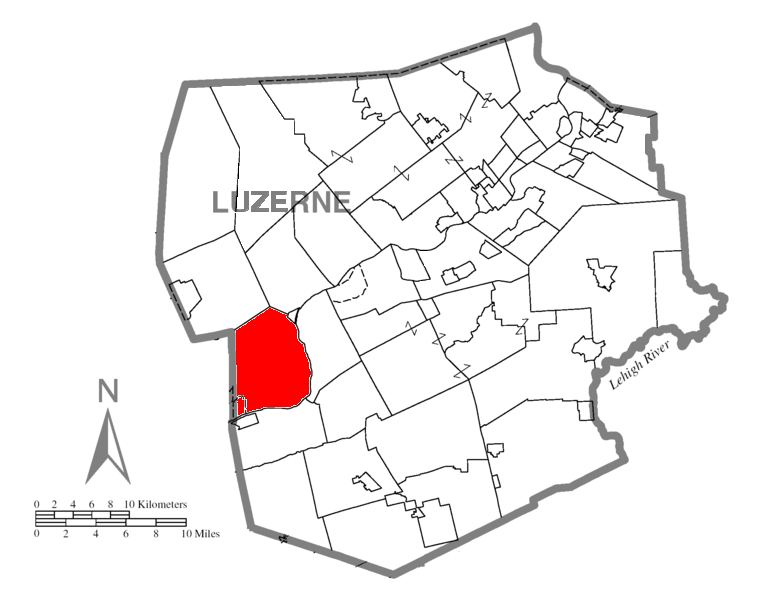
- Map of Luzerne County highlighting Salem Township

- Map of Pennsylvania highlighting Luzerne County
- Country: United States
- State: Pennsylvania
- County: Luzerne

Area
  - Total: 29.99 sq mi (77.68 km^{2})
  - Land: 28.99 sq mi (75.08 km^{2})
  - Water: 1.00 sq mi (2.60 km^{2})

Population (2020)
  - Total: 4,019 ▼
  - Estimate (2021): 4,023
  - Density: 144.5/sq mi (55.79/km^{2})
- Time zone: UTC-5 (Eastern (EST))
  - Summer (DST): UTC-4 (EDT)
- FIPS code: 42-079-67456
- Website: https://www.salemtwp.org/about-us

Salem Township is a township in Luzerne County, Pennsylvania, United States. The population was 4,019 at the 2020 census. The Susquehanna Steam Electric Station, a nuclear power plant, is located in Salem.

== History ==
The first white colonists in modern-day Salem Township were from Connecticut. Nathan Beach and his son, Josiah, were some of the many settlers who arrived in Salem. The village of Beach Haven is named in their honor. Salem Township is one of the eleven original townships of Luzerne County; it was formed in 1786. The municipality is named after Salem, Connecticut. Mills and farms were constructed throughout the township during its early years. Native American raids were also very common in and around Salem during the 18th century.

== Geography ==
According to the United States Census Bureau, the township has a total area of 30.0 square miles (77.7 km^{2}), of which 29.0 square miles (75.1 km^{2}) is land and 1.0 square mile (2.6 km^{2}), or 3.34%, is water. The Susquehanna River defines the eastern and southern borders of the township. U.S. 11 runs along the bank of the river. The physical Wyoming Valley, which consists of thick forests and very little farmland, makes up the northern part of Salem Township. The central and southern portions of the township are mostly made up of farming communities. East Berwick and Beach Haven are a couple of the farming communities located in southern Salem Township (along the Susquehanna River). The Susquehanna Steam Electric Station is located in the southeastern portion of the municipality.

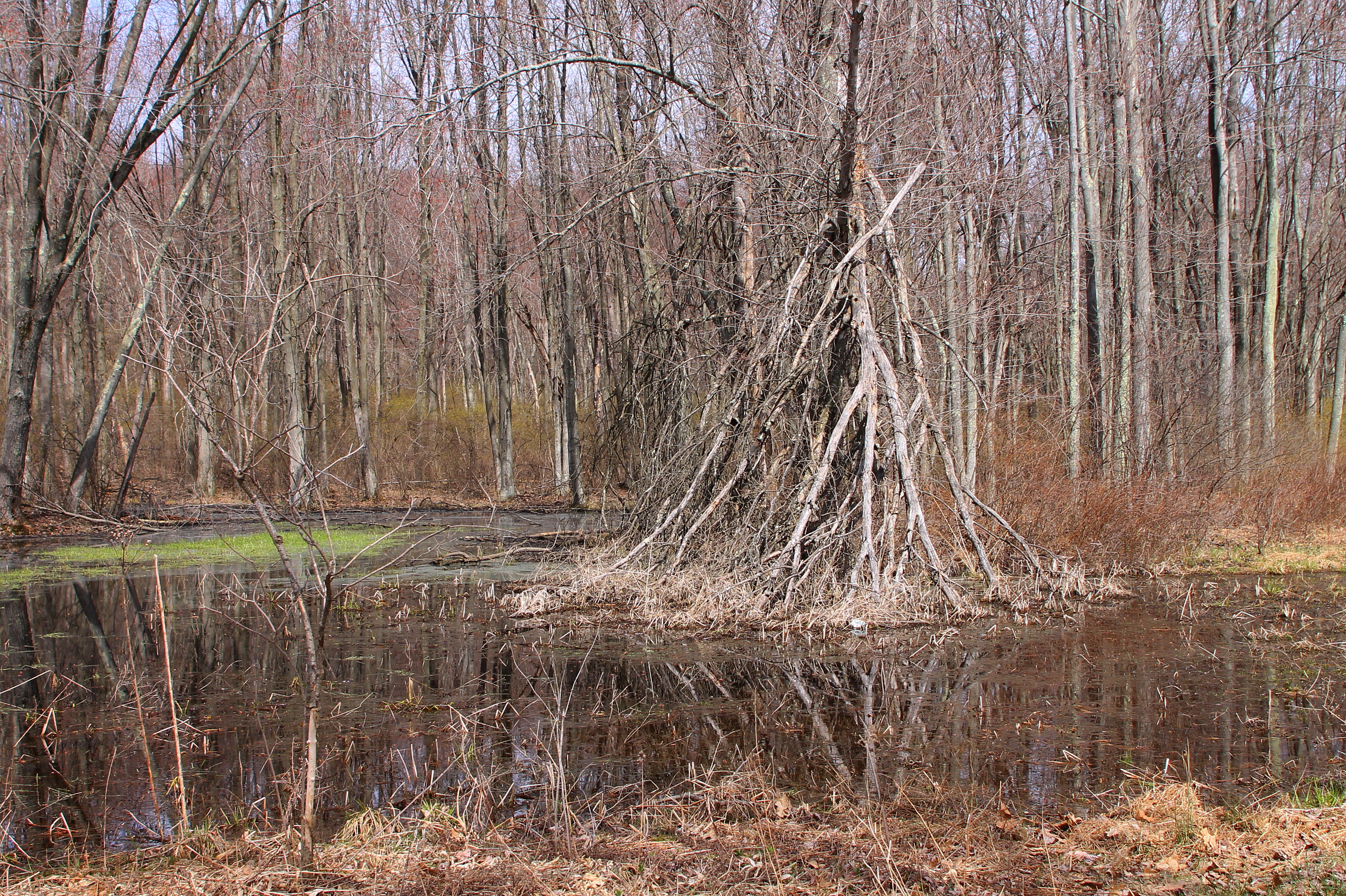
Wetland in Salem Township

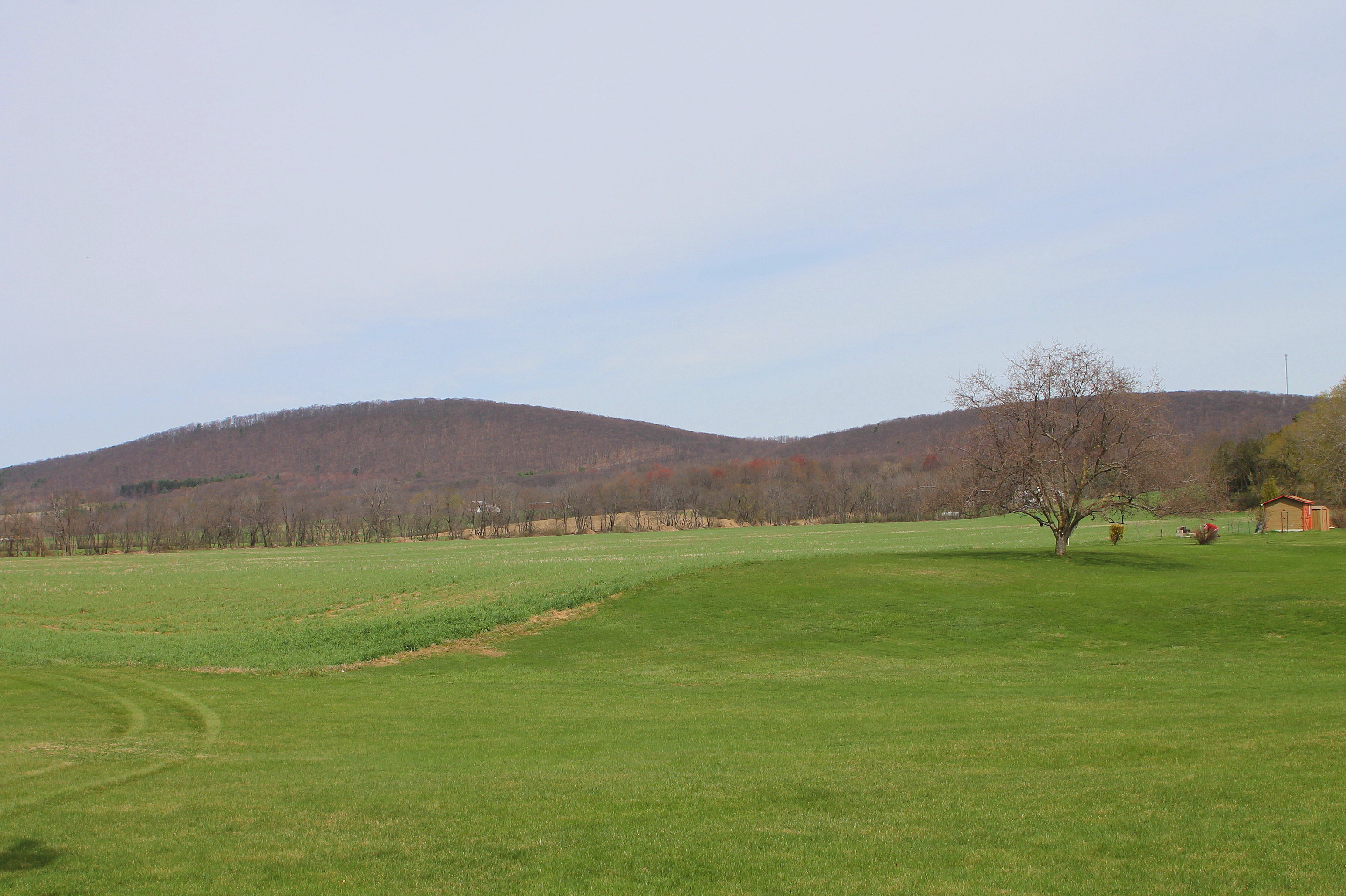
Salem Township from Stone Church Road

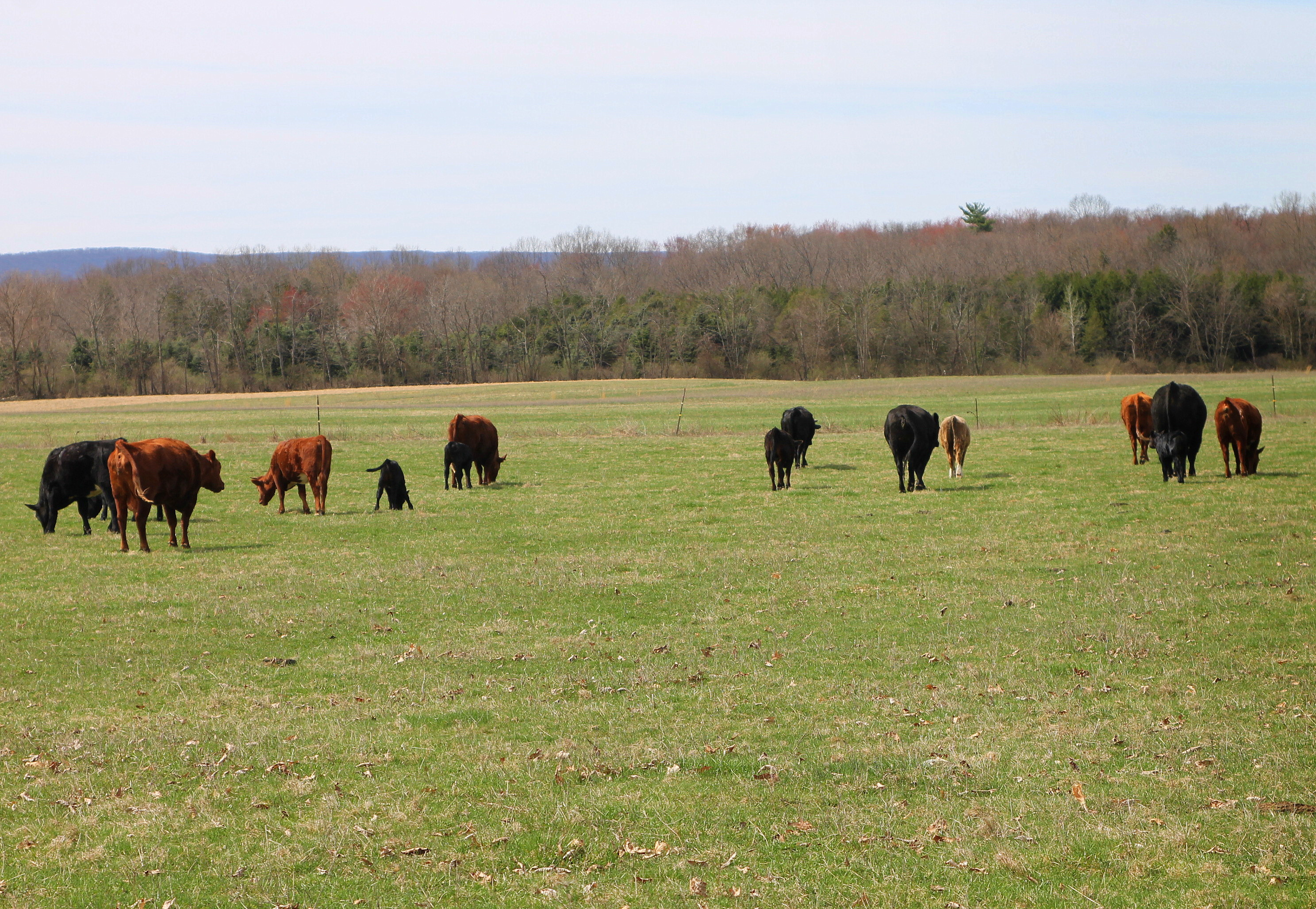
Cattle in Salem Township

== Demographics ==
Historical population
Census	Pop.	Note	%±
2000	4,269		—
2010	4,254		−0.4%
2020	4,019		−5.5%
2021 (est.)	4,023		0.1%
U.S. Decennial Census

As of the census of 2000, there were 4,269 people, 1,743 households, and 1,263 families living in the township. The population density was 147.2 inhabitants per square mile (56.8/km^{2}). There were 1,924 housing units at an average density of 66.3 per square mile (25.6/km^{2}). The racial makeup of the township was 98.62% White, 0.47% African American, 0.02% Native American, 0.30% Asian, 0.26% from other races, and 0.33% from two or more races. Hispanic or Latino of any race were 0.66% of the population.

There were 1,743 households, out of which 28.6% had children under the age of 18 living with them, 59.6% were married couples living together, 8.8% had a female householder with no husband present, and 27.5% were non-families. 23.9% of all households were made up of individuals, and 12.4% had someone living alone who was 65 years of age or older. The average household size was 2.45 and the average family size was 2.87.

In the township the population was spread out, with 22.1% under the age of 18, 6.5% from 18 to 24, 26.6% from 25 to 44, 25.2% from 45 to 64, and 19.6% who were 65 years of age or older. The median age was 42 years. For every 100 females, there were 97.5 males. For every 100 females age 18 and over, there were 95.3 males.

The median income for a household in the township was $38,429, and the median income for a family was $42,803. Males had a median income of $29,712 versus $25,450 for females. The per capita income for the township was $18,114. About 5.1% of families and 6.9% of the population were below the poverty line, including 11.9% of those under age 18 and 3.2% of those age 65 or over.
