= Briar Creek Township, Pennsylvania =

Township in Pennsylvania, US

Coordinates: 41°07′31″N 76°15′04″W

- Township
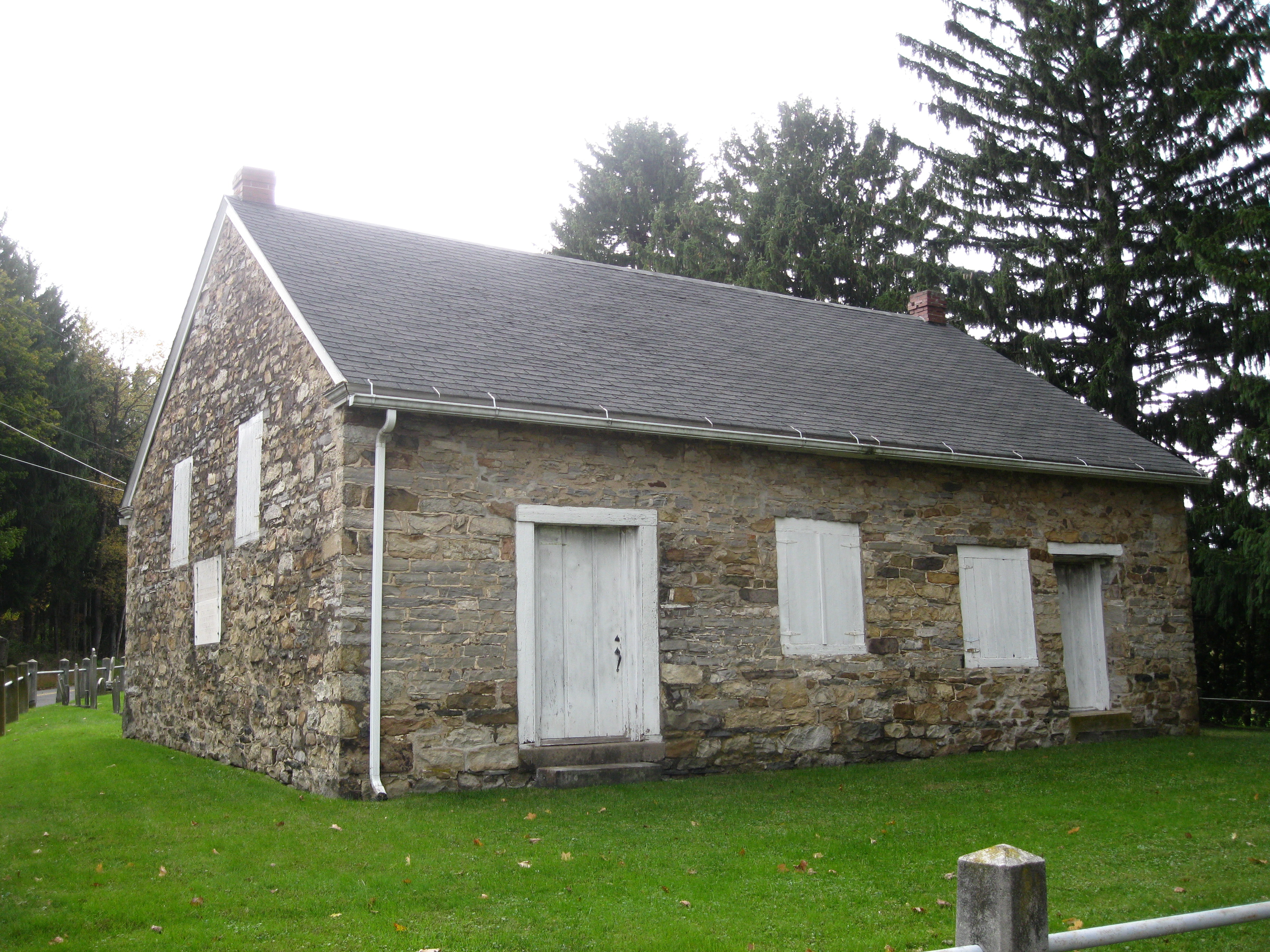
- The Old Stone Church in the township, built 1808

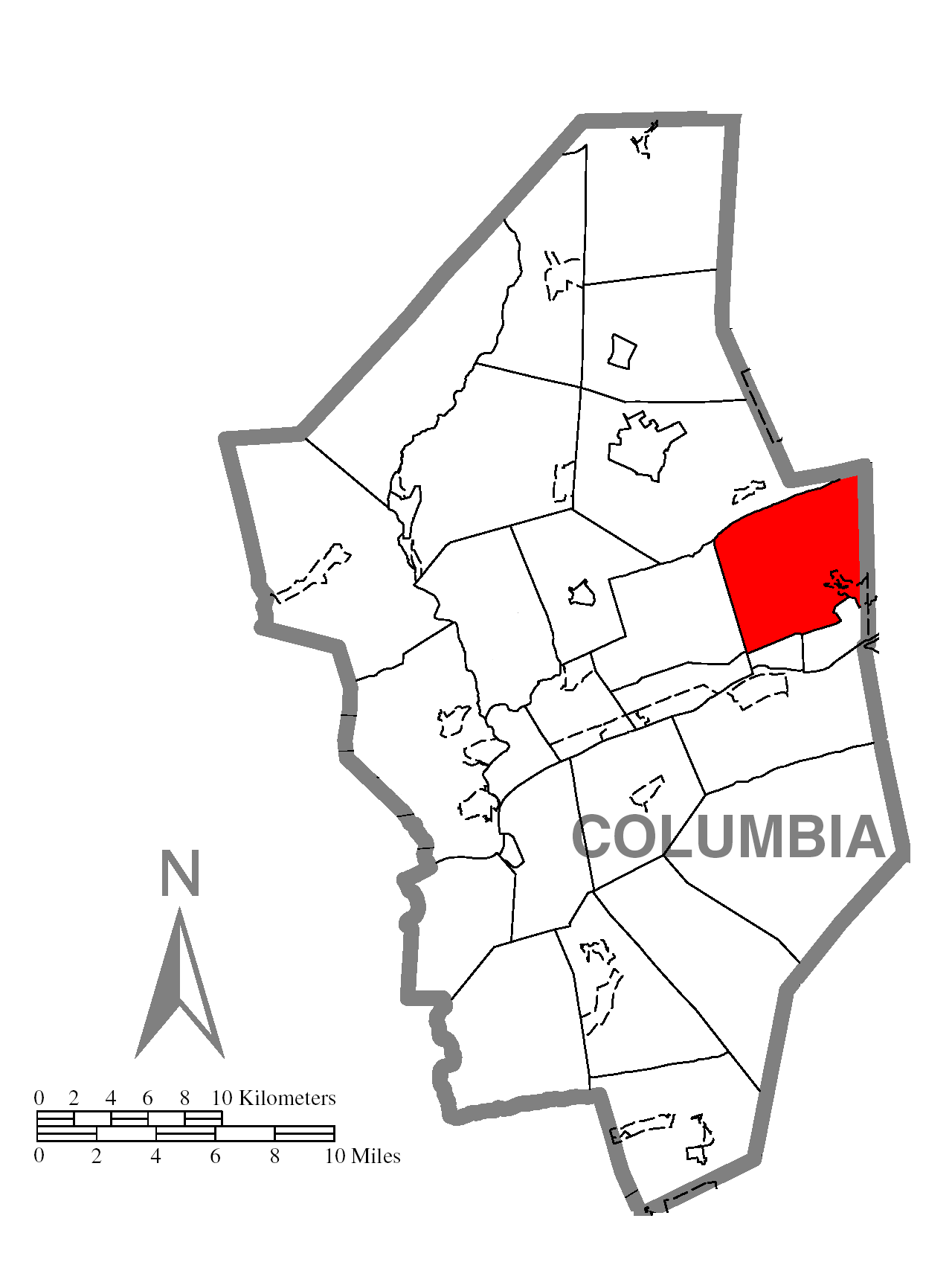
- Map of Columbia County, Pennsylvania highlighting Briar Creek Township

- Map of Columbia County, Pennsylvania
- Country: United States
- State: Pennsylvania
- County: Columbia
- Settled: 1793
- Incorporated: 1797

Area
  - Total: 21.18 sq mi (54.85 km^{2})
  - Land: 20.95 sq mi (54.27 km^{2})
  - Water: 0.22 sq mi (0.57 km^{2})

Population (2020)
  - Total: 2,992 ▼
  - Estimate (2021): 3,005
  - Density: 142.8/sq mi (55.15/km^{2})
- Time zone: UTC-5 (Eastern (EST))
  - Summer (DST): UTC-4 (EDT)
- Area code: 570
- FIPS code: 42-037-08480
- Website: www.briarcreektwp.org

Briar Creek Township is a township in Columbia County, Pennsylvania. It is part of Northeastern Pennsylvania. The population was 2,992 at the 2020 census.

== Geography ==
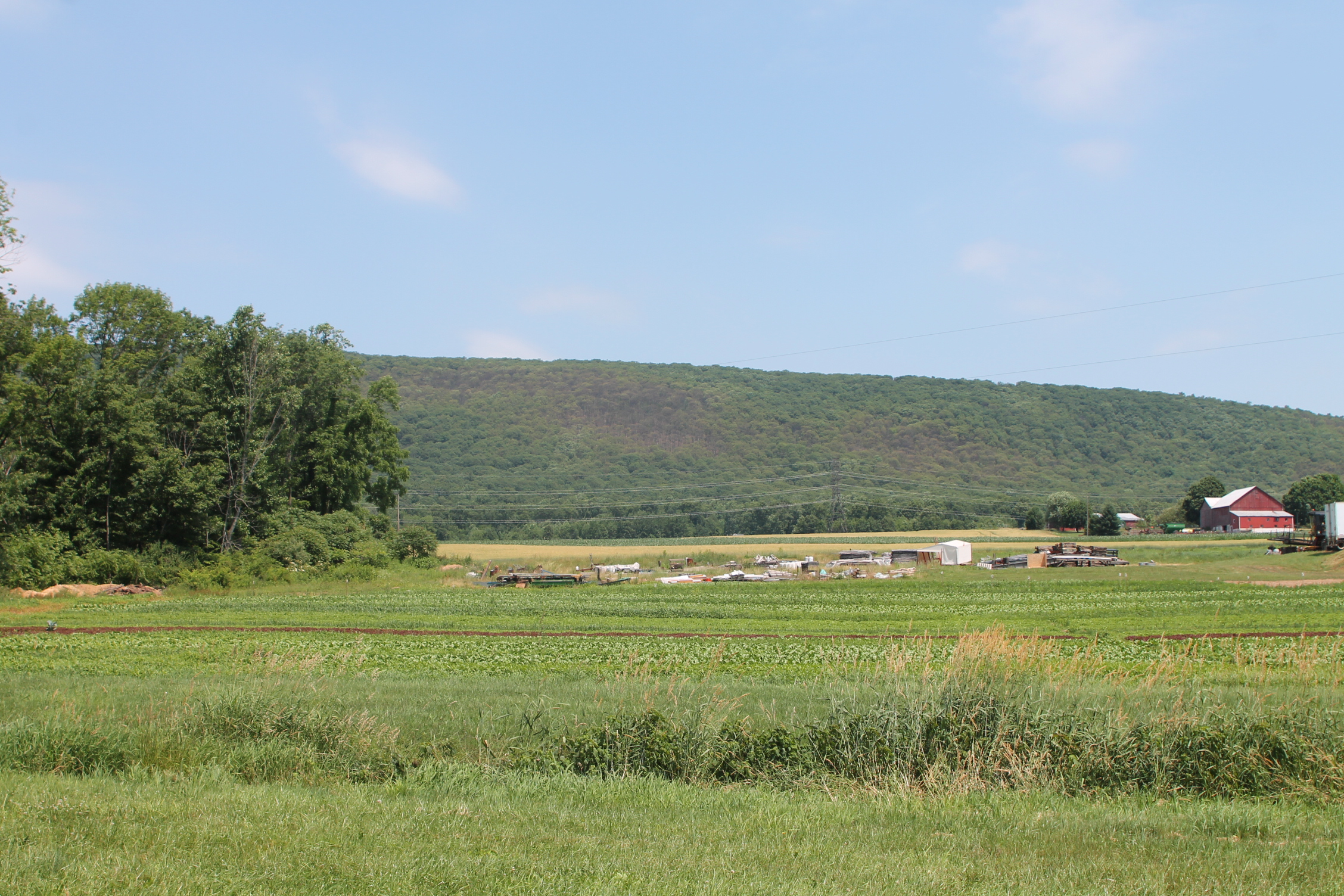
Knob Mountain rising above Briar Creek Township

Briar Creek Township is in eastern Columbia County, bordered to the east by Luzerne County, to the north by Fishing Creek Township, to the west by North Centre Township, and to the south by the boroughs of Briar Creek and Berwick. The unincorporated community of Foundryville is in the southeastern corner of the township, adjacent to Berwick.

The northern boundary of the township follows the ridgecrest of Huntington Mountain, while Lee Mountain is south of it, running nearly parallel to it. The two ridges converge to form Knob Mountain, which is primarily west of the township. According to the United States Census Bureau, the township has a total area of 21.2 square miles (54.8 km^{2}), of which 21.0 square miles (54.3 km^{2}) is land and 0.23 square miles (0.6 km^{2}), or 1.04%, is water.

== Demographics ==
Historical population
Census	Pop.	Note	%±
2010	3,016		—
2020	2,992		−0.8%
2021 (est.)	3,005		0.4%
U.S. Decennial Census

As of the census of 2000, there were 3,061 people, 1,225 households, and 911 families residing in the township. The population density was 145.2 inhabitants per square mile (56.1/km^{2}). There were 1,351 housing units at an average density of 64.1 per square mile (24.7/km^{2}). The racial makeup of the township was 99.18% White, 0.20% African American, 0.03% Native American, 0.10% Asian, 0.23% from other races, and 0.26% from two or more races. Hispanic or Latino of any race were 0.39% of the population.

There were 1,225 households, out of which 29.5% had children under the age of 18 living with them, 63.5% were married couples living together, 6.9% had a female householder with no husband present, and 25.6% were non-families. 22.0% of all households were made up of individuals, and 10.3% had someone living alone who was 65 years of age or older. The average household size was 2.50 and the average family size was 2.92.

In the township the population was spread out, with 22.4% under the age of 18, 6.4% from 18 to 24, 27.8% from 25 to 44, 28.5% from 45 to 64, and 14.9% who were 65 years of age or older. The median age was 41 years. For every 100 females, there were 95.5 males. For every 100 females age 18 and over, there were 94.4 males.

The median income for a household in the township was $37,743, and the median income for a family was $41,185. Males had a median income of $27,647 versus $19,032 for females. The per capita income for the township was $17,818. About 8.8% of families and 10.3% of the population were below the poverty line, including 17.5% of those under age 18 and 7.3% of those age 65 or over.
