= Reyburn Creek =

Physical characteristics
- Source
  - location: pond in Union Township, Luzerne County, Pennsylvania
  - elevation: between 1,080 and 1,100 feet (330 and 340 m)
- Mouth
  - location: Shickshinny Creek in Koonsville, in Union Township, Luzerne County, Pennsylvania
  - coordinates: 41°09′56″N 76°09′38″W
  - elevation: 620 ft (190 m)
- Length: 6.2 mi (10.0 km)
- Basin size: 9.52 sq mi (24.7 km^{2})
- Discharge
  - average: 1,410 cu ft/s (40 m^{3}/s) peak annual discharge at mouth (10% probability)

Basin features
- Progression: Shickshinny Creek → Susquehanna River → Chesapeake Bay
- Tributaries
  - left: one unnamed tributary

Reyburn Creek is a tributary of Shickshinny Creek in Luzerne County, Pennsylvania. It is approximately 6.2 miles (10.0 km) long and flows through Union Township. The watershed of the creek has an area of 9.52 square miles (24.7 km^{2}). It is designated as a Coldwater Fishery and a Migratory Fishery. Alluvium, Wisconsinan Outwash, Wisconsinan Till, Wisconsinan Ice-Contact Stratified Drift, Wisconsinan Bouldery Till, Wisconsinan Till Moraine, and bedrock consisting of shale and sandstone all occur near the creek.

== Course ==
Reyburn Creek begins in a pond in Union Township. It meanders south for nearly a mile before reaching the community of Muhlenburg. The creek then turns south-southeast for a few miles, flowing alongside Reyburn Road. Eventually, it turns south for more than a mile and receives an unnamed tributary from the left. The creek then turns southwest and flows alongside Shickshinny Mountain for more than a mile until it reaches its confluence with Shickshinny Creek in the village of Koonsville, in Union Township.

Reyburn Creek joins Shickshinny Creek 1.68 miles (2.70 km) upstream of its mouth.

== Hydrology ==
The peak annual discharge of Reyburn Creek at its mouth has a 10 percent chance of reaching 1410 cubic feet per second. It has a 2 percent chance of reaching 2465 cubic feet per second and a 1 percent chance of reaching 3035 cubic feet per second. It has a 0.2 percent chance of reaching 4580 cubic feet per second.

The peak annual discharge of Reyburn Creek upstream of a tributary 0.15 miles (0.24 km) north of Cragle Hill Road has a 10 percent chance of reaching 865 cubic feet per second. It has a 2 percent chance of reaching 1545 cubic feet per second and a 1 percent chance of reaching 1910 cubic feet per second. It has a 0.2 percent chance of reaching 2950 cubic feet per second.

The peak annual discharge of Reyburn Creek 0.25 miles (0.40 km) upstream of Road has a 10 percent chance of reaching 640 cubic feet per second. It has a 2 percent chance of reaching 1155 cubic feet per second and a 1 percent chance of reaching 1440 cubic feet per second. It has a 0.2 percent chance of reaching 2200 cubic feet per second.

== Geography ==
The elevation near the mouth of Reyburn Creek is 620 feet (190 m) above sea level. The elevation of the creek's source is between 1,080 and 1,100 feet (330 and 340 m) above sea level.

The 30-mile-long (48-kilometer-long) Stanton-Susquehanna #2 transmission power line crosses Reyburn Creek and at least 14 other bodies of water. Part of Shickshinny Mountain is in the lower reaches of the watershed of the creek.

The surficial geology along most of Reyburn Creek features alluvium. However, Wisconsinan Outwash occurs along the creek in its lower and middle reaches and a glacial or resedimented till known as Wisconsinan Till occurs near the creek in its middle and upper reaches. Wisconsinan Ice-Contact Stratified Drift, which contains stratified sand and gravel and some boulders, also occurs in the watershed. Wisconsinan Bouldery Till and Wisconsinan Till Moraine also occurs in the vicinity of the creek, especially near its headwaters. Additionally, bedrock consisting of sandstone and shale occurs in the surficial geology of large parts of the watershed.

== Watershed ==
The watershed of Reyburn Creek has an area of 9.52 square miles (24.7 km^{2}). The creek is entirely within the United States Geological Survey quadrangle of Shickshinny.

There are four features on Reyburn Creek that are identified as obstructions.

== History ==
Reyburn Creek was entered into the Geographic Names Information System on August 2, 1979. Its identifier in the Geographic Names Information System is 1184964.

Reyburn Creek, along with 99 other streams, was added to the Pennsylvania Fish and Boat Commission's list of wild trout streams in May 2011. The decision by the Pennsylvania Fish and Boat Commission to add the streams was unanimous. This action considered as early as March 2011.

== Biology ==
The entire drainage basin of Reyburn Creek is designated as a Coldwater Fishery and a Migratory Fishery. Wild trout naturally reproduce in the creek from its headwaters downstream to its mouth.

== See also ==
- Little Shickshinny Creek, next tributary of Shickshinny Creek going downstream
- Culver Creek, next tributary of Shickshinny Creek going upstream
- List of rivers of Pennsylvania
