= Culver Creek =

Culver Creek may refer to:

- Culver Creek (Ohio)
- Culver Creek (Pennsylvania), a tributary of Shickshinny Creek
