= Shickshinny, Pennsylvania =

Borough in Pennsylvania, US

- Borough
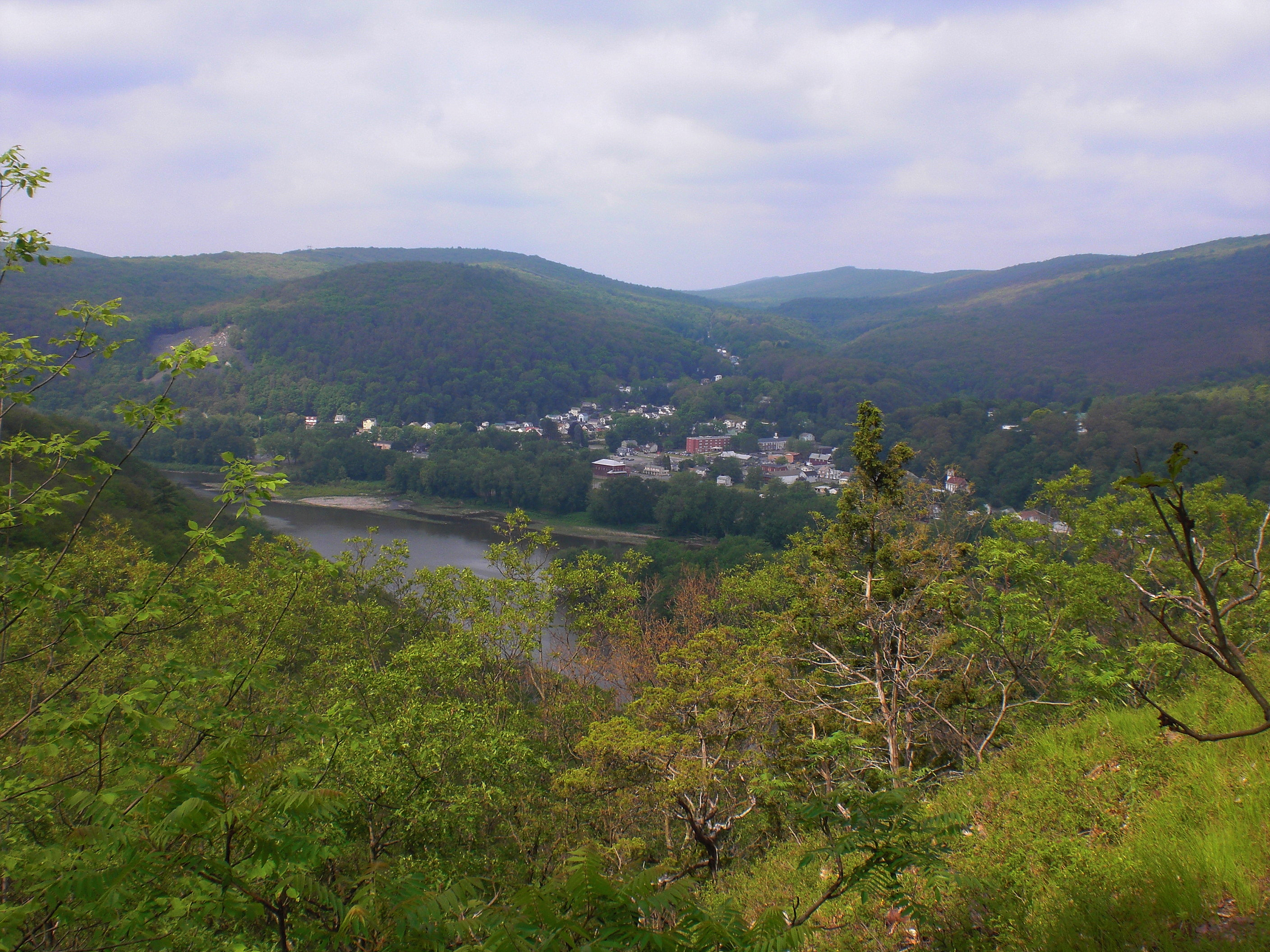
- View of Shickshinny from the Mocanaqua Loop Trail

- Location of Shickshinny in Luzerne County, Pennsylvania

- Location within Pennsylvania Location within the United States
- Coordinates: 41°09′15″N 76°09′04″W
- Country: United States
- State: Pennsylvania
- County: Luzerne
- Settled: 1782
- Incorporated: 1861

Government
  - Type: Borough Council
  - Mayor: Beverly Moore
  - President: Rosalie Whitebread

Area
  - Total: 0.49 sq mi (1.27 km^{2})
  - Land: 0.47 sq mi (1.23 km^{2})
  - Water: 0.012 sq mi (0.03 km^{2})
- Elevation: 512 ft (156 m)

Population (2020)
  - Total: 632
  - Density: 1,326.4/sq mi (512.14/km^{2})
- Time zone: UTC-5 (Eastern (EST))
  - Summer (DST): UTC-4 (EDT)
- ZIP Code: 18655
- Area code: 570
- FIPS code: 42-70224
- Website: www.shickshinny.org

Shickshinny is a borough in Luzerne County, Pennsylvania, United States. The population was 630 at the 2020 census.

The borough is named after Shickshinny Creek, which runs through the municipality and the surrounding area. According to the book Indian Villages and Place Names in Pennsylvania (by Dr. George P. Donehoo), the community's name likely means "Fine Stream" in a local Native American language. However, according to the Shickshinny Historical Society, the name Shickshinny means "Five Mountains" in a Native American language. Five mountains — Newport, Knob, Lee, River, and Rocky — encircle the creek and borough.

== History ==
=== Early history ===
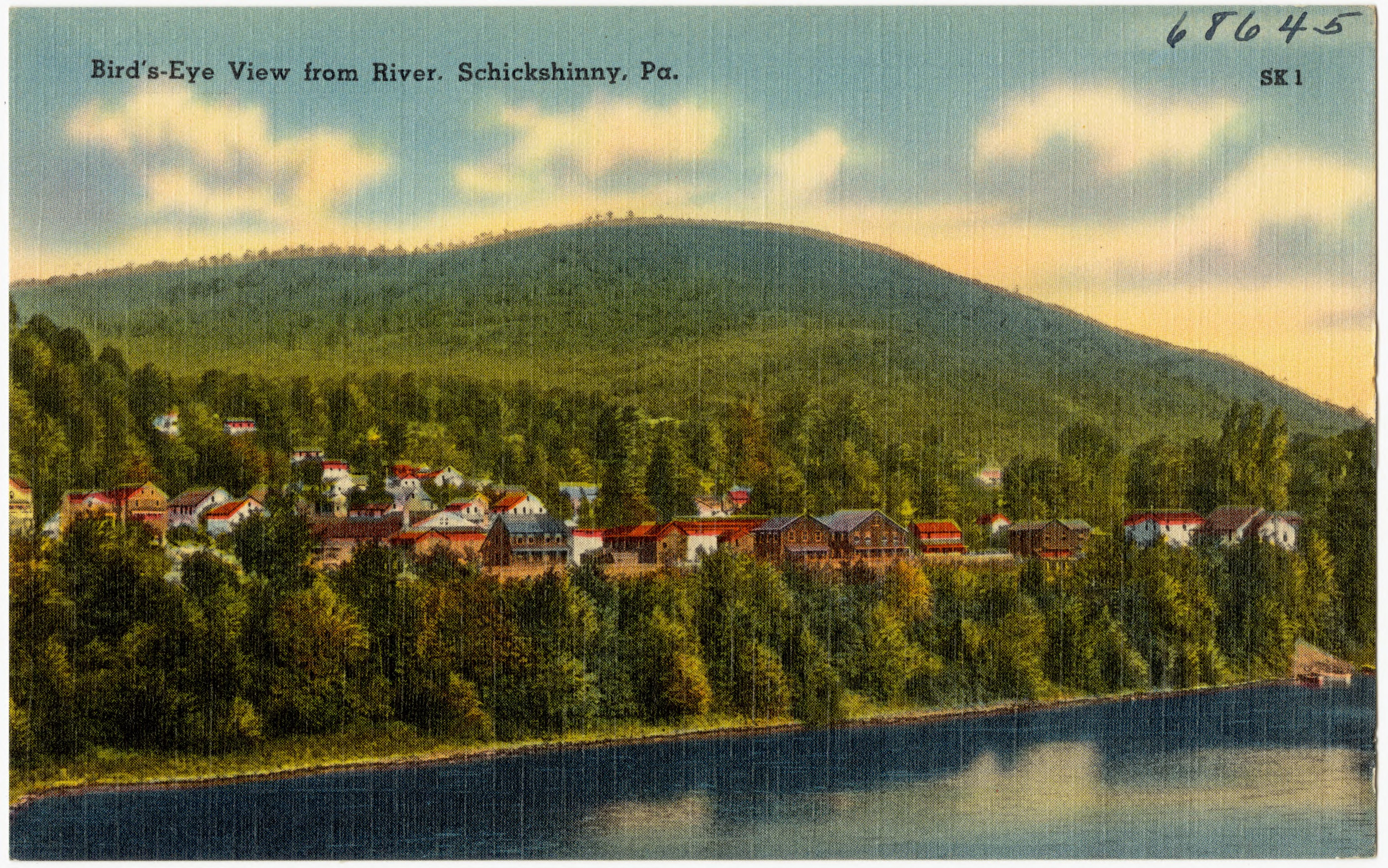
Shickshinny along the Susquehanna River

In 1782, the families of Austin and Crossley were the first white settlers in Shickshinny. The first permanent settler in the area was Lizzie James. At this time, Shickshinny was under the jurisdiction of Connecticut. In 1801, Shadrick Austin bought the 256 acres (104 ha) of land.

Another known settler in the area was William Koons (in the 1850s). Koons settled one mile outside of Shickshinny (where the Shickshinny Creek Bridge was later erected). The name of the area was changed to Koonsville (where the post office was later built). In 1773, Nathan Beach, also from Connecticut, settled outside of modern-day Shickshinny. The area was named Beach Haven after him.

A farm, which encompassed nearly the entire current-day borough, was established by Matthias Hollenback. By this time, it was under the Pennsylvania claim. The land was later inherited by his daughter, Cist Hollenback, who married Chester Butler. In 1857, upon C. Hollenbeck's death, the land was divided and sold to the proprietors of the Shickshinny Company: George W. Search, Lot Search, Nathan Beach Crary, and Nathan Garrison. Walter Garrison bought the corner where the modern-day bank is located. Lot Search held the position of Luzerne County treasurer in 1855 and maintained it for two years.

N. Garrison and Andrew J. Eldon built the first store, located outside the old storehouse, in June 1857. But a few months after the store opened, Eldon fled to China with $3,000 of Garrison's money. It was reported that Eldon was lost in a storm at sea and drowned from the weight of gold in his pockets. The business soon closed and was bought by Nathan B. Crary. A drug store opened at the same time. It was run and managed by Stephen Bond.

=== Borough ===
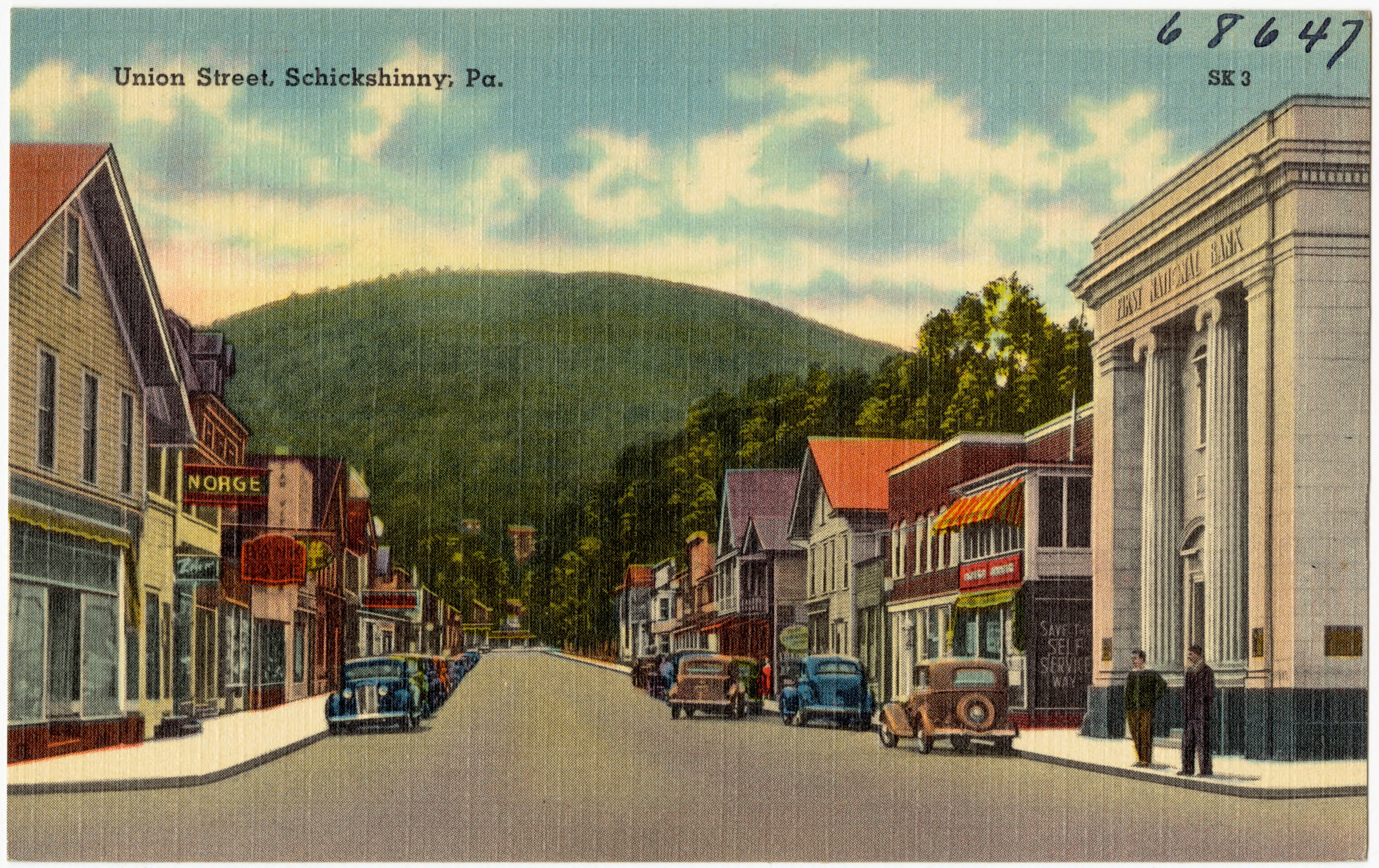
Union Street in Shickshinny

Shickshinny was incorporated as a borough on November 30, 1861. It gained its independence from Salem Township and Union Township, the majority (two-thirds) being from Union. The first officers were Burgess and Enke. The council was composed of Search, Koons, Crary, Nicely, and Davenport. G. W. Search became the secretary, while Slippy became supervisor. Second was Burgess, third Knor, fourth Youlls, fifth Bear, sixth Post, seventh Hughes, eighth Hartman, and ninth Bulkley.

Many businesses sprung up in the next decade, including a flour mill (set up by G. W. and Lot Search in 1865), a foundry (set up by Jesse Beadle, L. T. Hartman, and Frederick Beach in 1866), and a planing mill (set up by Amos Hess in 1874). Two blacksmith shops were also built and run by Miner Brown and Henry Wagner. The first newspaper in the area, The Mountain Echo, was first issued in 1873, established by C. A. Boone and M. E. Walker.

Shickshinny became a central hub for many farmers and businesses. A toll bridge was built in 1865 to Mocanaqua, the first of three up to 1920. An 1877 turnpike was built along the creek, heading towards Huntington Mills (modern-day Route 239).

=== Coal mining ===
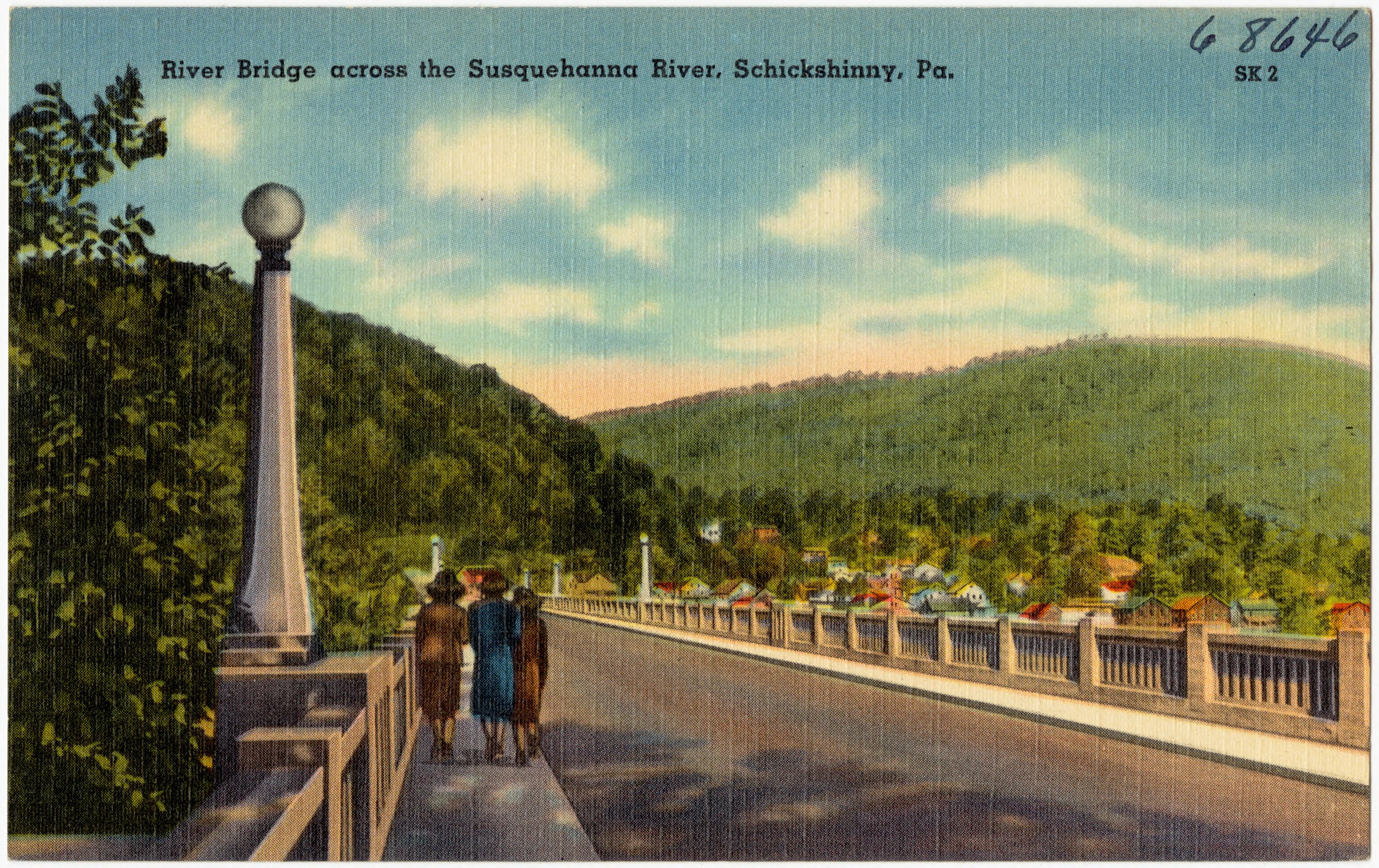
Bridge across the Susquehanna River (Shickshinny, Luzerne County)

Shickshinny is located at the lower end of the Wyoming Valley Coal Deposit, near a Red Ash vein that runs across the Susquehanna River.

Humphrey Davenport was employed in 1830 to prospect Nathan Beach's land. He soon discovered coal on Rocky Mountain. For the next decade, coal was extracted from the mountain by teams of men. Finally in 1840, Beach's grandson, Dr. Darwin Crary, invented the first inclined chute, which was used by the coal industry. It sent coal to the canal down the mountain. Two years later, in 1842, James A. Gordon built a plane for Beach and Crary. It ran for several successful years.

The mines were passed over to Truman H. Clark. In 1865, during the last year of the American Civil War, John M. Stackhouse and Matthew Wier purchased the mines. Cyrus Stackhouse bought out Wier's stock the following year. Again, in 1869, the mines exchanged hands and were bought by the Paxton Coal Company. The Salem Coal Company was formed four years later. Under their guidance, the mines produced 65,000 tons and employed just short of 200 men and boys.

A nearby mountain — Newport — provided coal as well. It sits on the opposite side of the Susquehanna River and was found to possess superior coal. In 1857, roads and bridges were built to connect the Lackawanna and Bloomsburg Railroad, which lay on opposite sides of the river, so as to be able to mine Newport Mountain. Neither the Shickshinny nor Mocanaqua mines are in service today.

== Demographics ==
Historical population
| Census | Pop. | Note | %± |
|---|---|---|---|
| 1870 | 1,045 | | — |
| 1880 | 1,058 | | 1.2% |
| 1890 | 1,448 | | 36.9% |
| 1900 | 1,456 | | 0.6% |
| 1910 | 1,917 | | 31.7% |
| 1920 | 2,289 | | 19.4% |
| 1930 | 2,451 | | 7.1% |
| 1940 | 2,354 | | −4.0% |
| 1950 | 2,156 | | −8.4% |
| 1960 | 1,843 | | −14.5% |
| 1970 | 1,685 | | −8.6% |
| 1980 | 1,192 | | −29.3% |
| 1990 | 1,108 | | −7.0% |
| 2000 | 959 | | −13.4% |
| 2010 | 838 | | −12.6% |
| 2020 | 632 | | −24.6% |
| 2021 (est.) | 629 | ▼ | −0.5% |
U.S. Decennial Census

=== 2000 U.S. Census ===
According to the 2000 United States census, Shickshinny had a population of 959 people, who made up 415 households and 241 families. The borough was 99% white, the remaining 1% were multiracial or unlisted. The population was approximately 47% male and 53% female, with 21% of the population below the age of 18, and 23% over the age of 65. The median age was 40.

The households occupied 415 of the 478 housing units in the borough, of these 60% were owned and 40% were rented. Out of the 415 households, 30% had children under the age of 18 living with them, 41% had elders over 65. About 41% of households were married, 10% had a female householder with no husband, and 42% were non-family households. 37% of householders lived alone, of which 24% were over the age of 65. The average household contained 2.3 people, while the average family contained 3 people.

A sampling of the population shows that the majority of enrolled students, 63%, were in elementary school (K-8), while 27% were in high school (9–12) and 4% in college or graduate school. The remaining were in preschool. 47% of the population, over 25 years of age, had a high school diploma while 32% did not. Out of the remaining population 21% had attended college while 9% had an associate degree or greater.

The median income for a household in the borough was $28,594, while the median family income was $36,333. The male median income was $27,273 compared to the female median income of $21,250.The per capita income for the borough was $14,880. About 9% of families and 10% of individuals incomes were below the poverty line.

== Education ==
Northwest Area School District serves Shickshinny, as well as the borough of New Columbus and the townships of Fairmont, Huntington, Hunlock, and Union. The student body is separated into primary, intermediate, and junior/senior high schools. Northwest Area School District formerly contained three elementary schools. These schools were: Huntington Mills Elementary School, Hunlock Creek Elementary School, and Garrison Elementary School. Garrison Elementary was located in downtown Shickshinny, next to Shickshinny Creek, while Hunlock Creek Elementary and Huntington Mills Elementary were located in their namesake communities. At the end of the 2009–2010 school year, Garrison Elementary was closed.

== Geography ==
Shickshinny is located at 41°9′15″N 76°9′4″W (41.154044, -76.151182) along U.S. Route 11, midway between Nanticoke and Berwick. It is situated along the western bank of the Susquehanna River at the mouth of Shickshinny Creek. Little Shickshinny Creek, a tributary of Shickshinny Creek, meets Shickshinny Creek in the borough.

According to the United States Census Bureau, the borough has a total area of 0.50 square miles (1.3 km^{2}), of which 0.46 square miles (1.2 km^{2}) is land and 0.04 square miles (0.1 km^{2}), or 9.34%, is water. Shickshinny's terrain is flat in the east; the elevation increases as you move westward. Shickshinny is made up of homes and businesses; the borough is surrounded by thick forests. The Susquehanna Warrior Trail passes through Shickshinny.

=== Major roads ===
US-11 runs through Shickshinny in a south–north direction. Pennsylvania Route 239 enters Shickshinny in the northwest. It exits the borough in the southeast and crosses over the Susquehanna River (in the direction of Mocanaqua).

=== Climate ===
The Köppen Climate Classification subtype for this climate is "Dfb" (Warm Summer Continental Climate).

=== Gallery ===
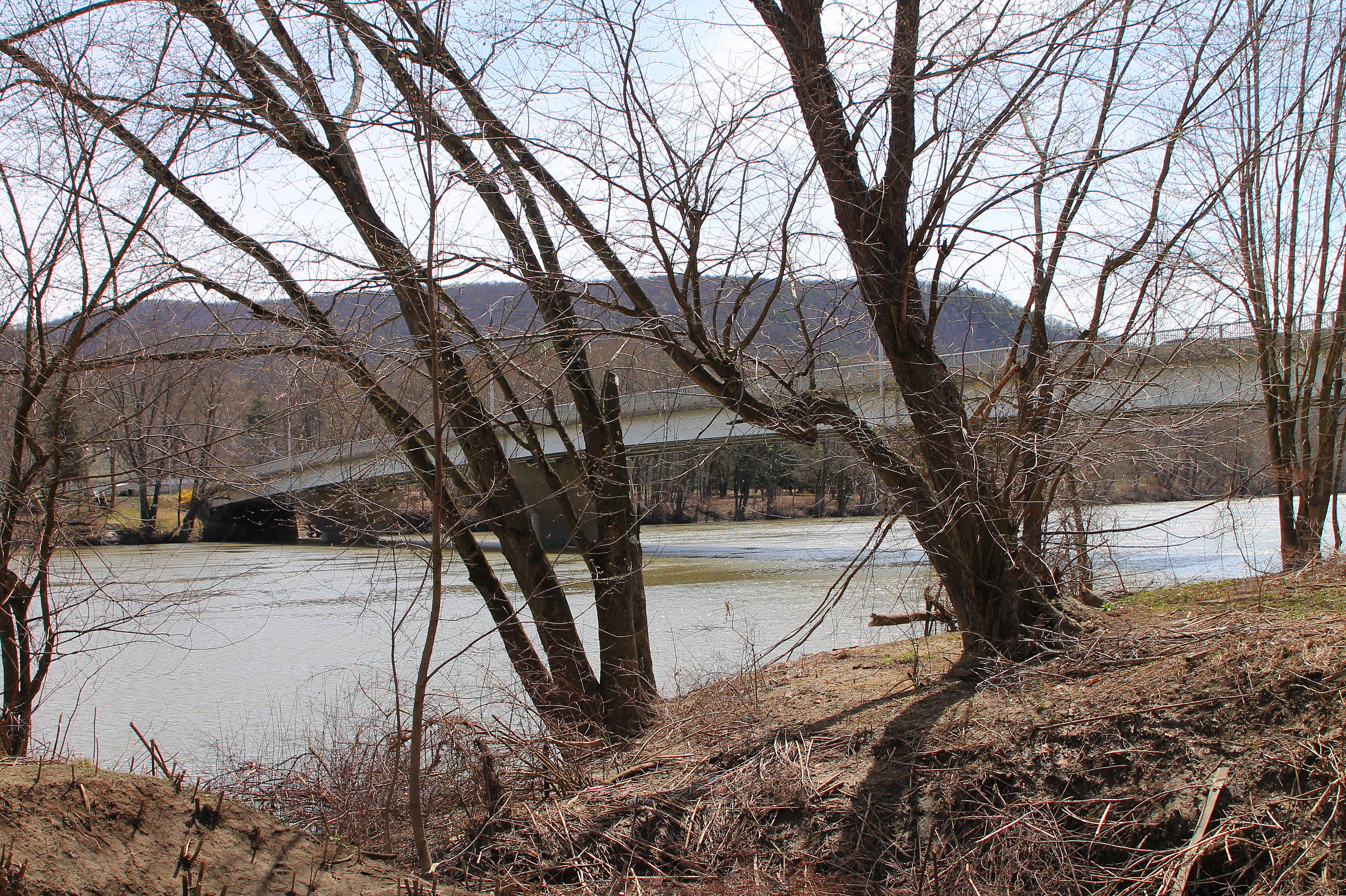
The PA 239 bridge linking Shickshinny to Mocanaqua

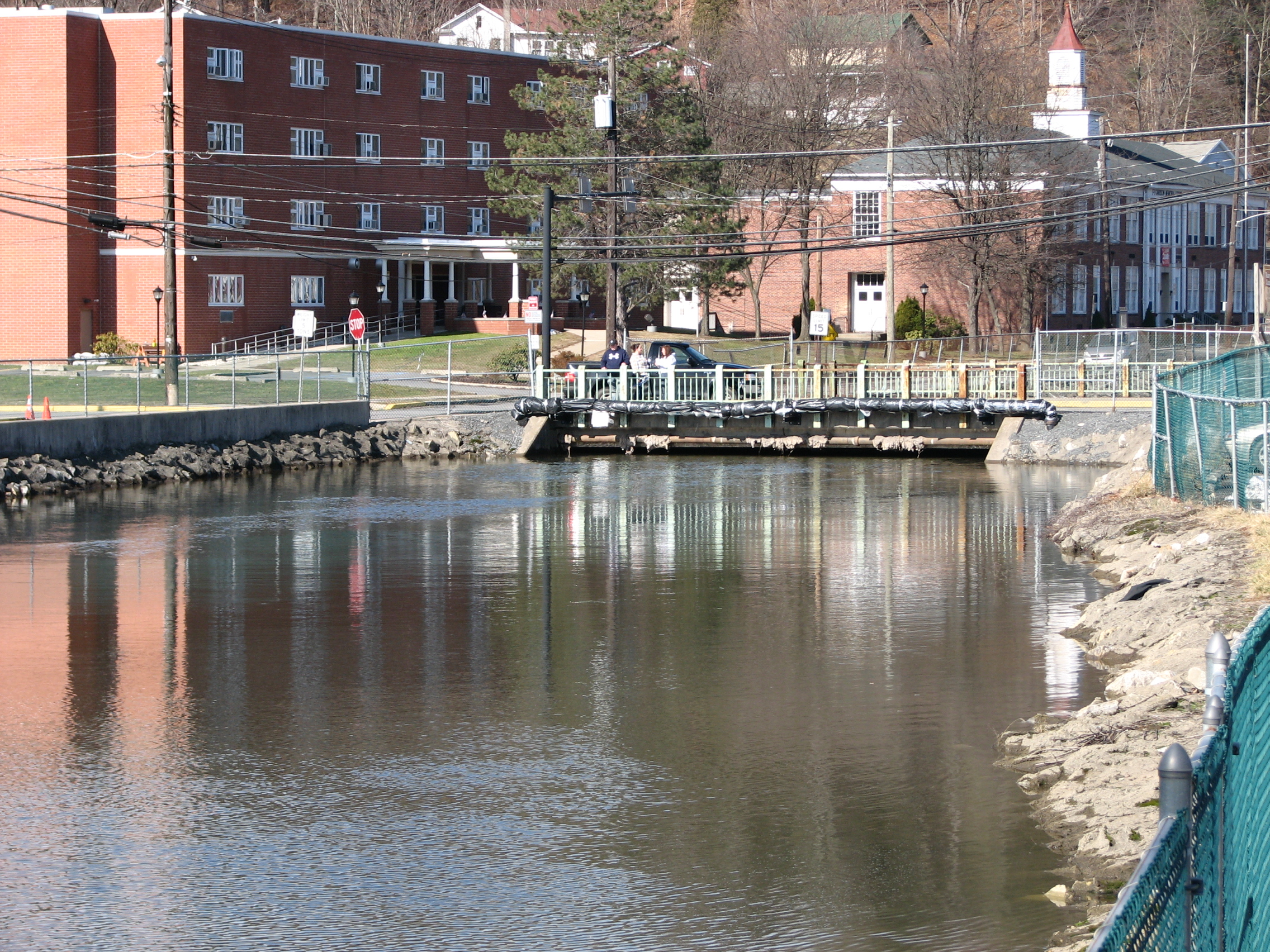
Shickshinny Creek

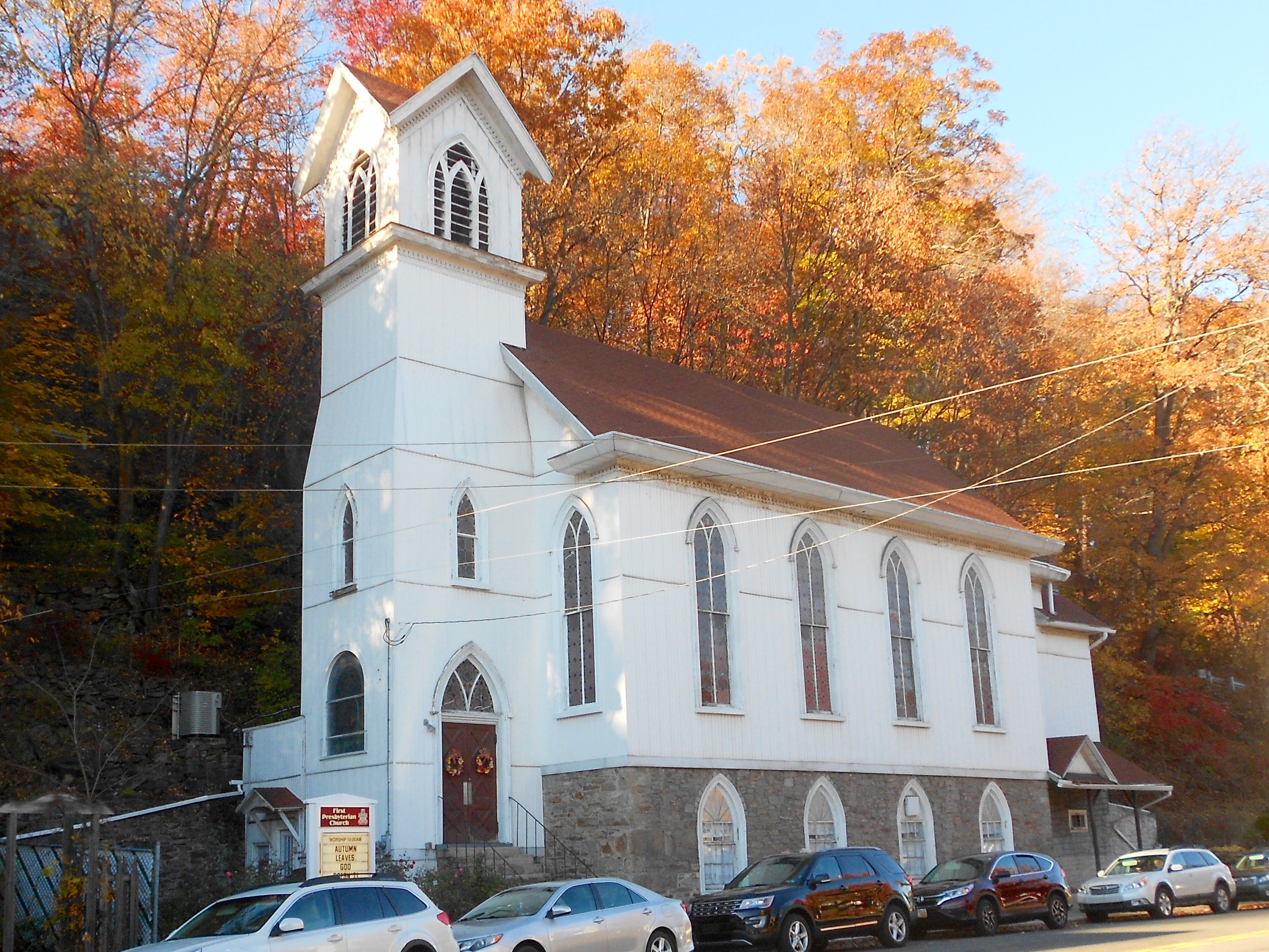
Presbyterian Church in Shickshinny

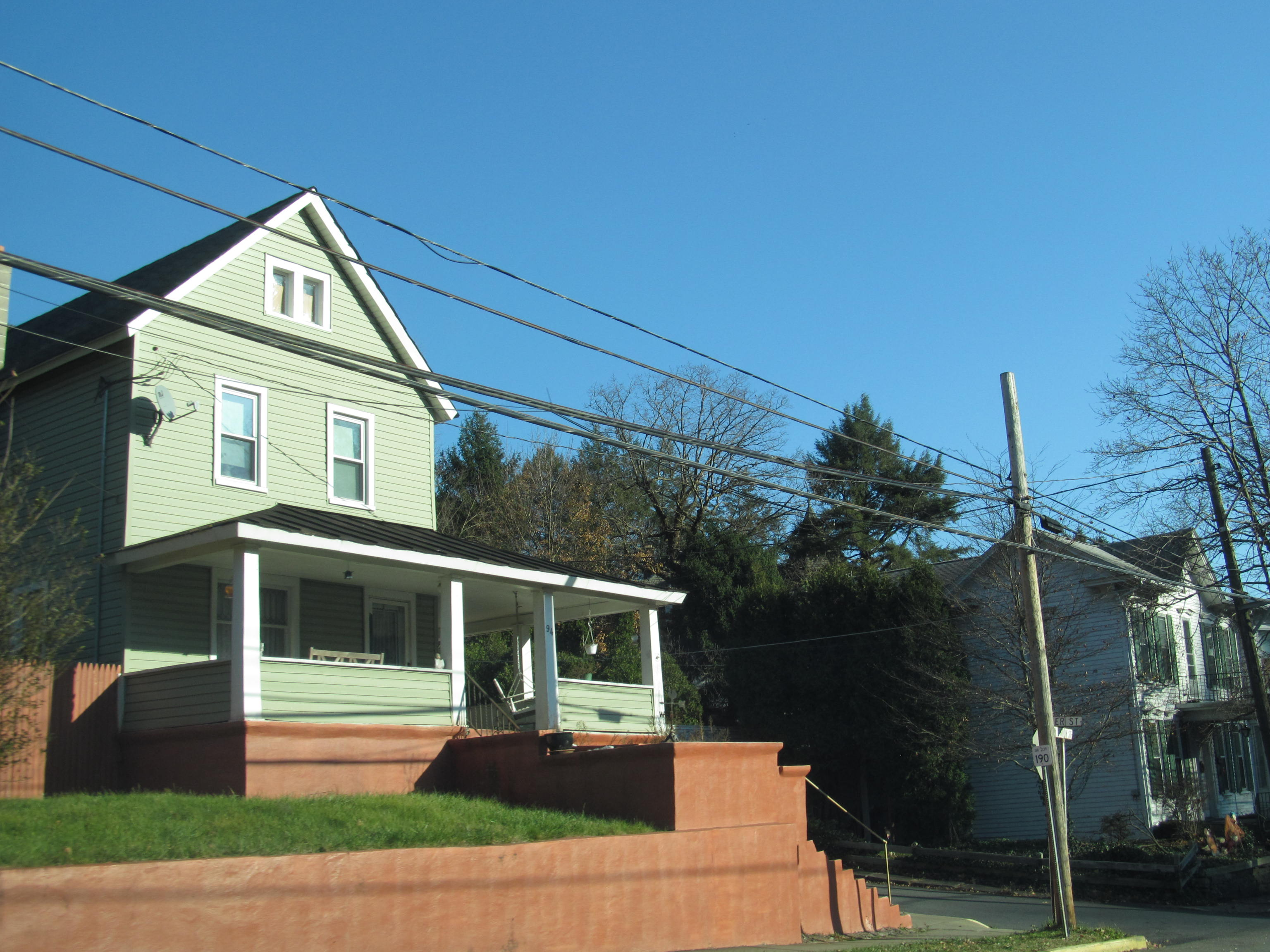
Houses in Shickshinny

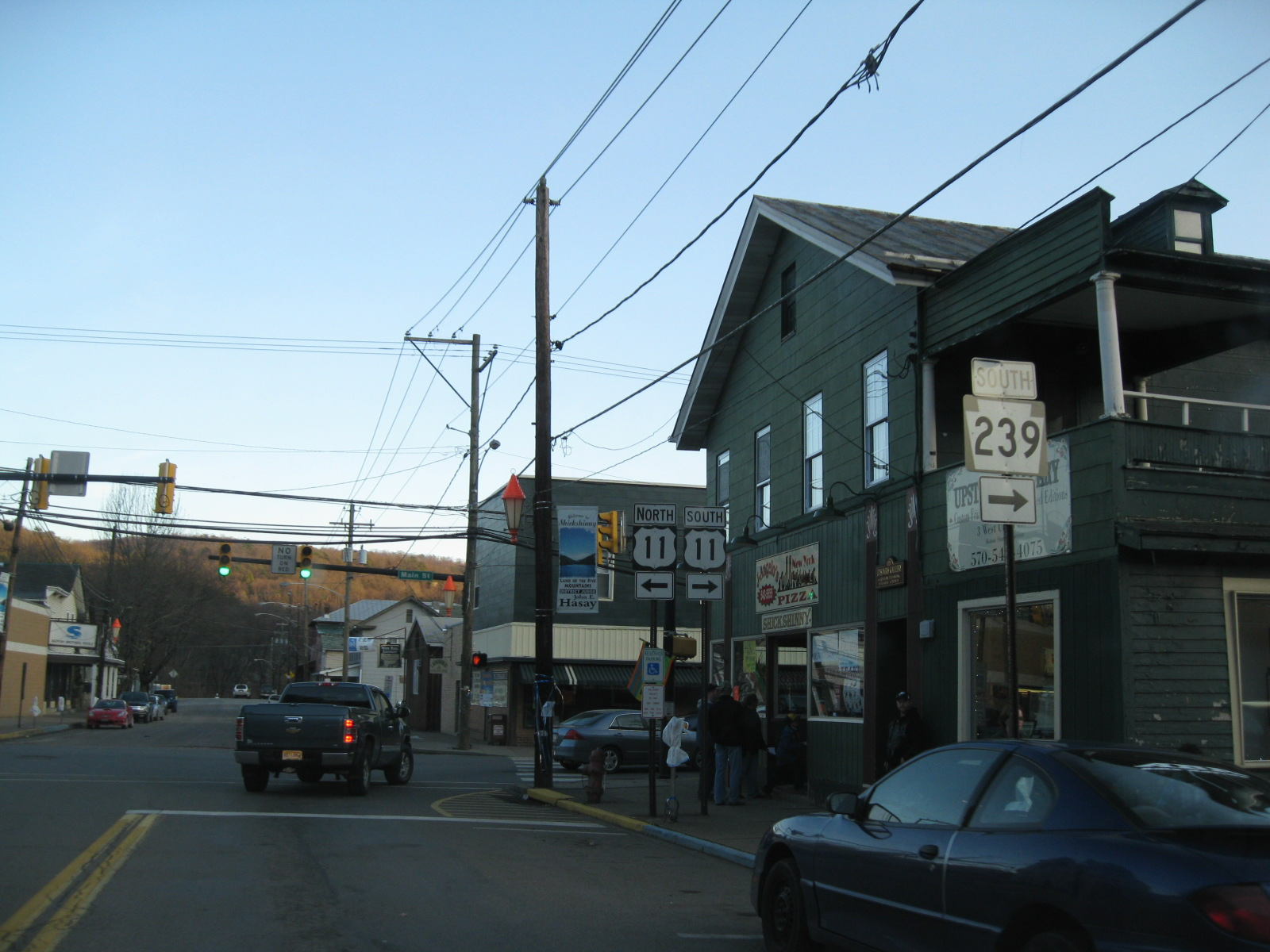
Road in Shickshinny

== Notable people ==
- Ryan McGlynn, racing driver
- Krysten Ritter, actress
- Carl Sawatski, Major League Baseball player and president of the Texas League (1976 to 1991)
