= Shickshinny Creek =

Tributary of the Susquehanna River

Shickshinny Creek Shickohinna
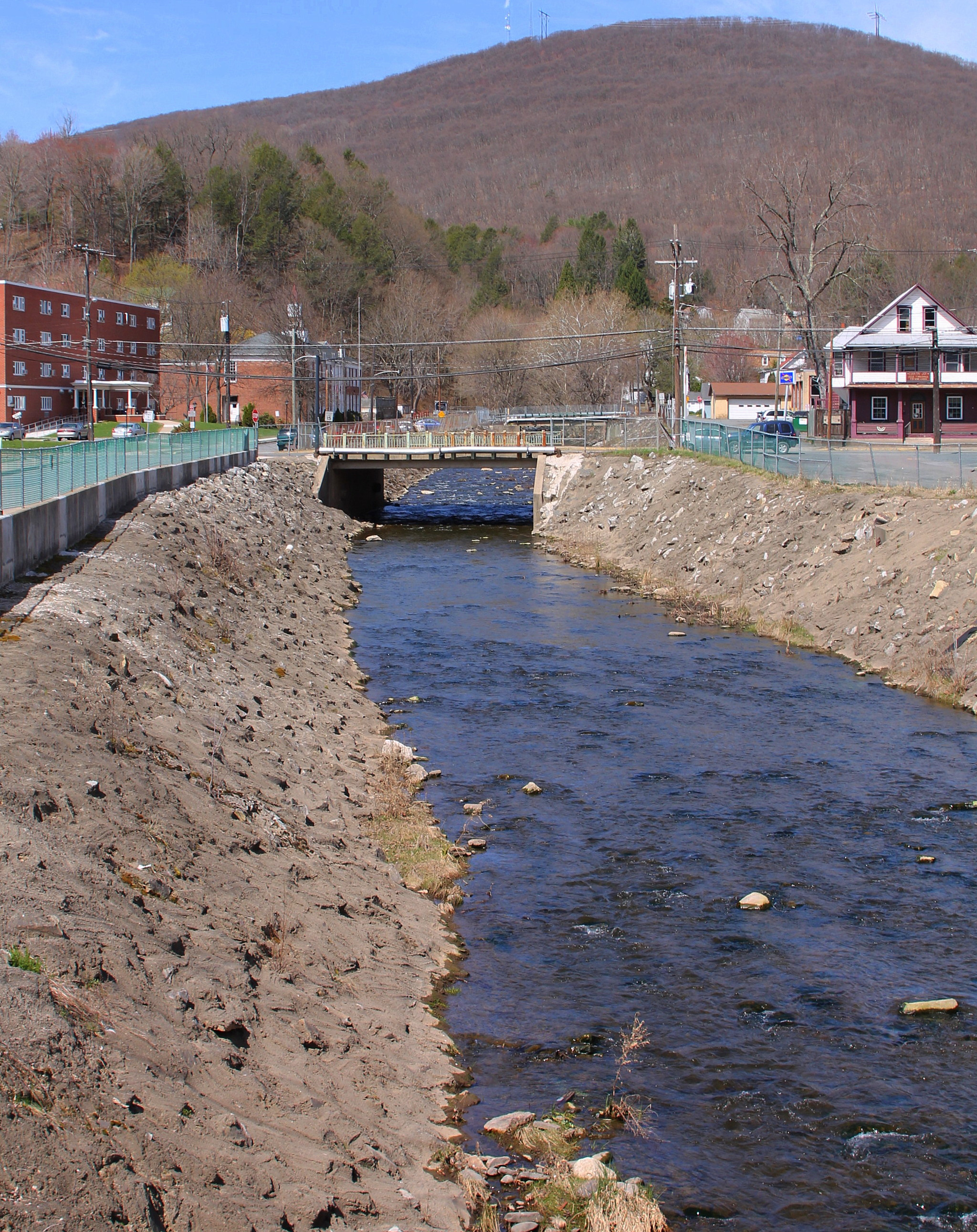
- Shickshinny Creek in Shickshinny
- Etymology: possibly a corruption of Schigi-hanna, which itself means "fine creek"

Physical characteristics
- Source
  - location: valley northwest of Sylvan Lake in Ross Township, Luzerne County, Pennsylvania
  - elevation: between 1,200 and 1,220 feet (370 and 370 m)
- Mouth
  - location: Susquehanna River in Shickshinny, Luzerne County, Pennsylvania
  - coordinates: 41°09′05″N 76°08′48″W
  - elevation: 499 ft (152 m)
- Length: 10.1 mi (16.3 km)
- Basin size: 35.0 mi^{2} (91 km^{2})

Basin features
- Progression: Susquehanna River → Chesapeake Bay
- Tributaries
  - left: Reyburn Creek
  - right: Culver Creek, Little Shickshinny Creek

Shickshinny Creek (historically known as Shickohinna) is a tributary of the Susquehanna River in the Wyoming Valley in Luzerne County, Pennsylvania, in the United States. It is approximately 10.1 miles (16.3 km) long and flows through Ross Township, Union Township, and Shickshinny. Its watershed has an area of 35.0 square miles (91 km^{2}) and its tributaries include Culver Creek, Reyburn Creek, and Little Shickshinny Creek. The creek is designated as a Coldwater Fishery and a Migratory Fishery. A sawmill and a gristmill were built on the creek in 1802 and 1804, respectively. Several bridges have also been constructed over it. The creek was historically polluted by culm near its mouth, but agriculture was the main industry in the watershed in the early 1900s. It was historically used as a water supply.

The surficial geology near Shickshinny Creek mainly consists of urban land, fill, alluvium, alluvial terrace, alluvial fan, Wisconsinan Ice-Contact Stratified Drift, Wisconsinan Ice-Contact Delta, Wisconsinan Bouldery Till, Wisconsinan Till, lakes, and wetlands. The lower reaches of the creek are in a water gap between Huntington Mountain and Shickshinny Mountain. A lake known as Shickshinny Lake is in the watershed and is dammed by the Shickshinny Lake Dam.

== Course ==
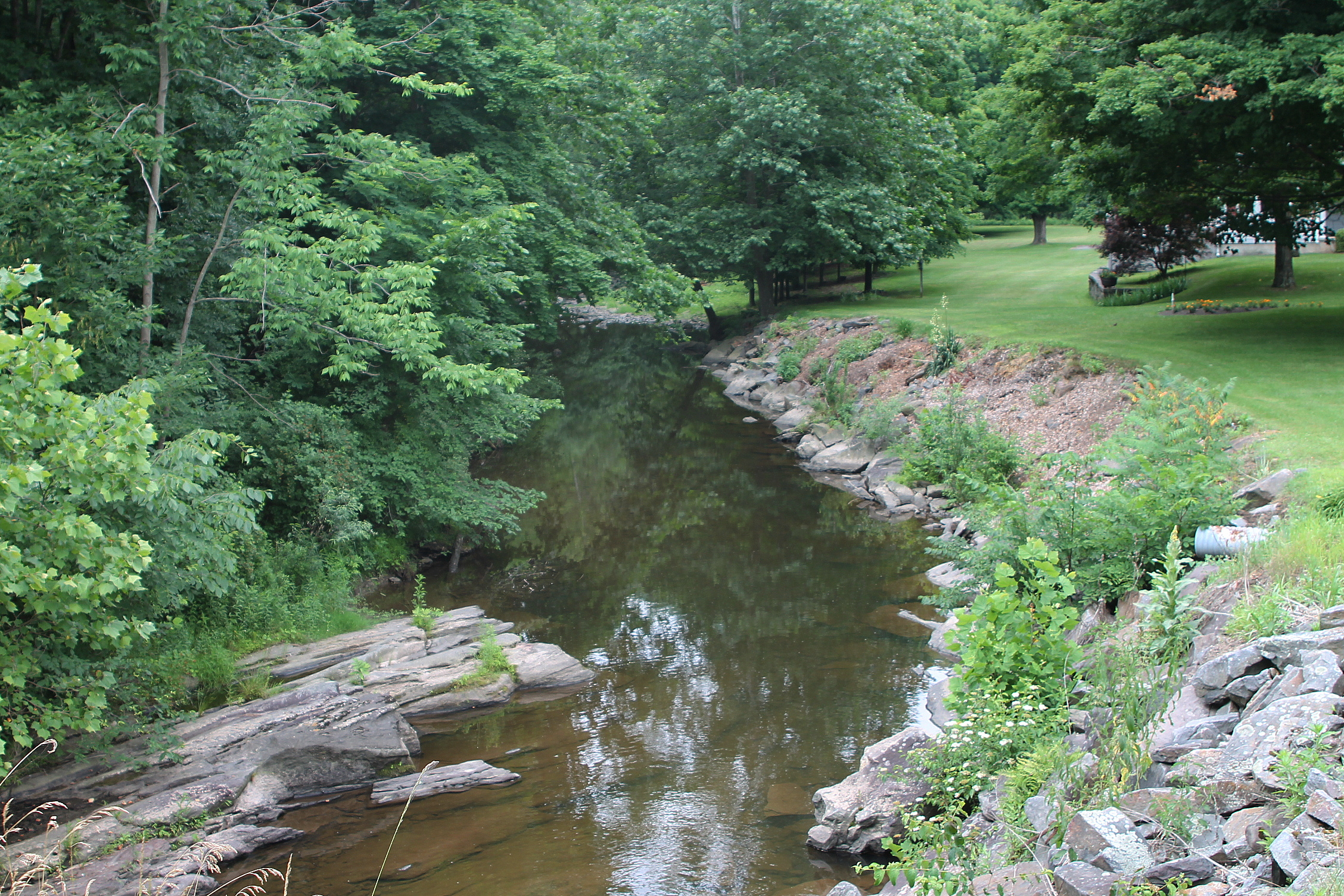
Shickshinny Creek near Koonsville

Shickshinny Creek begins in a valley in Ross Township, northwest of Sylvan Lake. It flows south for a few miles, crossing State Route 4024 and passing through two ponds. It then turns south-southwest for more than a mile, entering Union Township. At this point, the creek turns south for a short distance before turning south-southwest again and flowing through a valley known as Nevel Hollow, crossing State Route 4016 along the way. At the end of Nevel Hollow, the creek enters Shickshinny Lake, where it receives its first named tributary, Culver Creek, from the right. At the southeastern end of Shickshinny Lake, the creek flows southeast for a few miles in a valley, crossing State Route 4007. It eventually turns south for nearly a mile before turning east for a short distance. It then receives the tributary Reyburn Creek from the left and turns south, passing through the village of Koonsville and crossing Pennsylvania Route 239. The creek then turns south-southeast for approximately a mile, flowing alongside Pennsylvania Route 239 in a water gap between Huntington Mountain and Shickshinny Mountain. It enters Shickshinny and receives the tributary Little Shickshinny Creek from the right before turning east-southeast for several tenths of a mile. The creek flows through Shickshinny and crosses US Route 11 before reaching its confluence with the Susquehanna River.

Shickshinny Creek joins the Susquehanna River 172.34 miles (277.35 km) upriver of its mouth.

=== Tributaries ===
Shickshinny Creek has three named tributaries, which are known as Little Shickshinny Creek, Reyburn Creek, and Culver Creek. Little Shickshinny Creek joins Shickshinny Creek 0.46 miles (0.74 km) upstream of its mouth. Its watershed has an area of 9.80 square miles (25.4 km^{2}). Reyburn Creek joins Shickshinny Creek 1.68 miles (2.70 km) upstream of its mouth. Its watershed has an area of 9.52 square miles (24.7 km^{2}). Culver Creek joins Shickshinny Creek 6.72 miles (10.81 km) upstream of its mouth. Its watershed has an area of 1.10 square miles (2.8 km^{2}).

== Hydrology and climate ==
Shickshinny Creek has a low level of alkalinity. The discharge of the creek at Shickshinny was measured to be 65 cubic feet per second in April 1965. The specific conductance of the creek at that time was measured to be 60 micro-siemens per centimeter at 25 °C (77 °F). The pH was 6.2 and the concentration of water hardness was 23 milligrams per liter.

In the early 1900s, Shickshinny Creek was a clear stream until 200 feet (61 m) from its mouth. At this location, the Salem Breaker of the E.S. Stackhouse Coal Company drained into it via the abandoned Pennsylvania Canal. The creek contributed some culm to the Susquehanna River.

In April 1965, the concentration of carbon dioxide in the waters of Shickshinny Creek was once measured to be 7.2 milligrams per liter (0.0072 oz/cu ft) milligrams per liter. The concentration of bicarbonate was 7 milligrams per liter (0.0070 oz/cu ft) and the concentration of nitrogen in the form of nitrates was 0.158 milligrams per liter (0.000158 oz/cu ft). The nitrate concentration was 0.700 milligrams per liter (0.000699 oz/cu ft), the concentration of sulfate was 15.0 milligrams per liter (0.0150 oz/cu ft), and the chloride concentration was 3.5 milligrams per liter (0.0035 oz/cu ft). The concentration of sodium was measured to be 1.60 milligrams per liter (0.00160 oz/cu ft).

At the border between Union Township and Shickshinny, the peak annual discharge of Shickshinny Creek has a 10 percent chance of reaching 2,500 cubic feet per second (71 m^{3}/s). It has a 2 percent chance of reaching 4,800 cubic feet per second (140 m^{3}/s) and a 1 percent chance of reaching 6,200 cubic feet per second (180 m^{3}/s). The peak annual discharge has a 0.2 percent chance of reaching 10,800 cubic feet per second (310 m^{3}/s).

Upstream of Reyburn Creek, the peak annual discharge of Shickshinny Creek has a 10 percent chance of reaching 1,270 cubic feet per second (36 m^{3}/s). It has a 2 percent chance of reaching 2,030 cubic feet per second (57 m^{3}/s) and a 1 percent chance of reaching 2,440 cubic feet per second (69 m^{3}/s). The peak annual discharge has a 0.2 percent chance of reaching 4,160 cubic feet per second (118 m^{3}/s).

Upstream of one of its unnamed tributaries, the peak annual discharge of Shickshinny Creek has a 10 percent chance of reaching 650 cubic feet per second (18 m^{3}/s). It has a 2 percent chance of reaching 950 cubic feet per second (27 m^{3}/s) and a 1 percent chance of reaching 1,120 cubic feet per second (32 m^{3}/s). The peak annual discharge has a 0.2 percent chance of reaching 2,390 cubic feet per second (68 m^{3}/s).

The average annual rainfall is between 35 and 45 inches (89 and 114 cm). In late April 1965, the water temperature of the creek was measured to be 11.0 °C (51.8 °F).

== Geology and geography ==
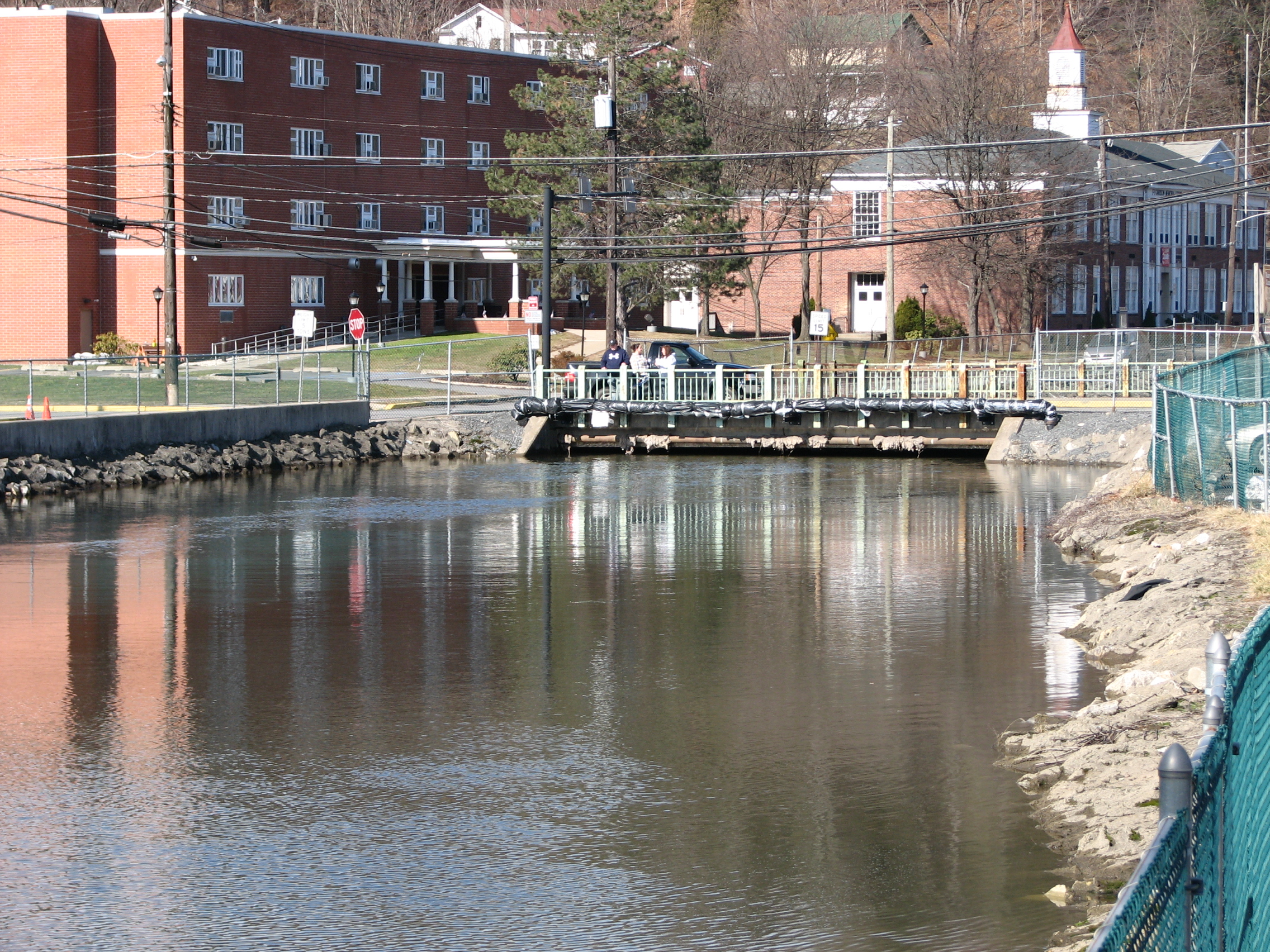
Shickshinny Creek in its lower reaches

The elevation near the mouth of Shickshinny Creek is 499 feet (152 m) above sea level. The elevation of the creek's source is between 1,200 and 1,220 feet (370 and 370 m) above sea level. In its first mile, the elevation of the creek decreases by 160 feet (49 m). From this point to its mouth, its elevation decreases at a rate of 67.1 feet per mile (12.71 m/km).

The course of Shickshinny Creek has been described as "sinuous". The creek flows through rock formations consisting of sandstone and shale. It is situated in a gorge for a mile in its lower reaches.

The Pocono Beds are found near Shickshinny Creek, on Shickshinny Mountain. The Pocono Beds are found at the same level as the creek slightly north of Shickshinny. This rock formation consists of 200 feet (61 m) of gray sandstone and brownish sandy shales. Approximately 400 feet (120 m) below the Pocono Beds is a layer of rock approximately 50 feet (15 m) thick and composed of pebbly sandstone. This may be the Mount Pleasant Formation. The Mauch Chunk Formation is also found in the watershed. Additionally, the Chemung Beds are found on parts of the creek.

In its lower reaches, the surficial geology in the vicinity of Shickshinny Creek consists of urban land highly disrupted by cut and fill, alluvium, alluvial terrace, fill, Wisconsinan Ice-Contact Stratified Drift containing stratified sand and gravel, Wisconsinan Ice-Contact Delta containing sand and gravel, Wisconsinan Bouldery Till (a glacial or resedimented till containing boulders, and bedrock consisting of sandstone and shale. The bedrock mainly occurs on the mountains in this part of the watershed. In the middle reaches of the creek, the surficial geology mainly features bedrock consisting of sandstone and shale, alluvium, and a glacial or resedimented till known as Wisconsinan Till. Some Wisconsinan Outwash and alluvial terrace is also present near Koonsville. Some patches of Wisconsinan Bouldery Till and wetlands are also present. In its upper reaches, the creek is almost entirely dominated by Wisconsinan Till, bedrock, and some lakes. However, there is a patch of alluvial fan immediately north of Shickshinny Lake and some Wisconsinan Bouldery Till and Wisconsinan Outwash not far from the creek's source.

The watershed of the tributary Little Shickshinny Creek is located in the Wyoming Coal Basin. Little Shickshinny Creek flows between Huntington Mountain and Lee Mountain. The Watsontown Axis crosses Shickshinny Creek.

The Shickshinny Creek watershed is in the Wyoming Valley. The creek is in the vicinity of Shickshinny Mountain. Glacial deposits along the lower reaches of the creek can be up to 30 feet (9.1 m) deep.

A 62-foot-deep well in the Shickshinny Creek water gap was once noted by Newport to produce 40 US gallons (150 L) of water per minute.

== Watershed ==
The watershed of Shickshinny Creek has an area of 35.0 square miles (91 km^{2}). It is located in the northwestern part of Luzerne County and the northeastern part of Columbia County. The area of the portion of the watershed that is upstream of Reyburn Creek has an area of 11.97 square miles (31.0 km^{2}). The mouth of the creek is in the United States Geological Survey quadrangle of Shickshinny. However, its source is in the quadrangle of Sweet Valley.

The lower reaches of the watershed of Shickshinny Creek mostly consist of mountains. The upper reaches of the watershed consist of hills, swamps, and lakes. The communities of Muhlenburg and Shickshinny are in the creek's watershed.

A lake known as Shickshinny Lake is in the watershed of Shickshinny Creek. It has an area of approximately 129 acres (52 ha). The lake is dammed by the Shickshinny Lake Dam. The dam is 365 feet (111 m) long and 33 feet (10 m) high, with a width of 17 feet (5.2 m) at its crest. It is covered in grass on both sides, with some riprap also occurring on its north side. A 1980 inspection found its spillway to be "inadequate", but lacking "major deficiencies". However, there was some seepage and erosion.

Shickshinny Creek is the main source of flooding in Union Township and one of the main sources of flooding in Shickshinny. During the largest flood in Union Township, which occurred in June 1972, the creek's floodwaters reached a depth of 2 feet (0.61 m) above McKendree Road in Koonsville. The creek's discharge in southern Union Township approached 8,300 cubic feet per second (240 m^{3}/s).

== History and etymology ==
Shickshinny Creek was entered into the Geographic Names Information System on August 2, 1979. Its identifier in the Geographic Names Information System is 1187507. The origin of the creek's name is unknown, but it may be an Anglicized corruption of the word Schigi-hanna, which is itself a rough translation of "fine creek".

The first sawmill in Union Township, Luzerne County was built by Isaac Benscotter in 1802. The first gristmill in the township was built on the creek by George Gregory in 1804. The Search brothers built a number of mills on Shickshinny Creek in 1858. They included a sawmill, a flour mill, a plaster mill, and a brickyard and were collectively known as the Shickshinny Mills or Search's Mills.

A turnpike was built through the Shickshinny Creek gap in 1877. A number of bridges have been constructed over the creek. A masonry arch bridge carrying Glen Ave over the creek is 32.2 feet (9.8 m) long. A concrete tee beam bridge carrying Pennsylvania Route 239 over the creek was constructed in 1925. It is 33.1 feet (10.1 m) long and is situated in Union Township. A steel stringer/multi-beam or girder bridge was built over the creek in 1930 and renovated in the 2010s. It is 46.9 feet (14.3 m) long and carries Bartoli Lane. A bridge of the same type, but carrying State Route 4007, was built in Union Township in 1940. This bridge is 51.8 feet (15.8 m) long. A concrete tee beam bridge carrying that road over the creek was built in 1965. It is 35.1 feet (10.7 m) long and is also situated in Union Township.

The Shickshinny Water Company used a stream in the Shickshinny Creek watershed as a water supply in the early 1900s. Little Shickshinny Creek has been used as a water supply for Shickshinny, as well as Mocanaqua. Agriculture has been a significant industry in the watershed in the past. The streams of the watershed also power small mills.

In 1996, 3,000 US gallons (11,000 L) of oil leaked from a pipe into Shickshinny Creek, but there was no major environmental damage.

== Biology ==
The main stem of Shickshinny Creek is designated as a Coldwater Fishery and a Migratory Fishery. (Note: See § 93.3 of Chapter 25 of the Pennsylvania Code for definitions.) The tributaries Reyburn Creek and Culver Creek, as well as several unnamed streams in the watershed, also hold these designations. However, the tributary Little Shickshinny Creek is designated as a High-Quality Coldwater Fishery and a Migratory Fishery. Wild trout naturally reproduce in Shickshinny Creek from its headwaters downstream to its mouth.

The tributary Little Shickshinny Creek is listed on the Columbia County Natural Areas Inventory. The area in its vicinity contains habitats such as a Hemlock Palustrine Forest Natural Community, a red maple swamp, a dry oak-heath forest, a highbush blueberry shrub swamp, and a reservoir.

== See also ==
- Paddy Run, next tributary of the Susquehanna River going downriver
- Hunlock Creek, next tributary of the Susquehanna River going upriver
- List of rivers of Pennsylvania
