= Northwest Area School District =

School district in Pennsylvania

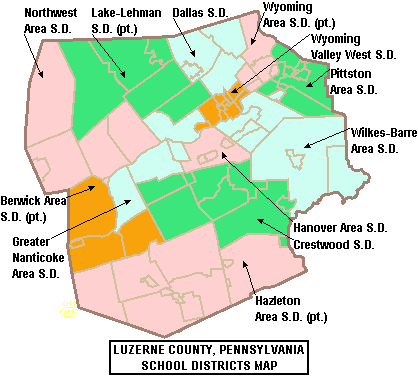
- Location of Northwest Area School District in Luzerne County, Pennsylvania

Students and staff
- District mascot: Ranger

Other information
- Website: www.nasdedu.com

The Northwest Area School District (NASD) is a small, rural public school district in Luzerne County, Pennsylvania, USA. The district comprises the boroughs of New Columbus and Shickshinny and the townships of Hunlock, Union, Huntington, and Fairmount, serving a resident population of 9,172. The district mascot is Ranger. The student body is known as the Northwest Rangers and separated into a primary school, and a middle/high school. According to 2000 federal census data, it serves a resident population of 9,172. In 2009, the residents' per capita income was $16,665 while the median family income was $42,524.

== History ==
The Northwest Area School District formerly contained three elementary schools that contributed to the student body of the Northwest Area High School. These schools were Huntington Mills Elementary School, Hunlock Township Elementary School and F.L. Garrison Memorial Elementary School. At the end of the 2009–2010 school year, the Garrison Elementary School was closed and the remaining two elementary schools were renamed and the students re-distributed between them. The new school names are the Northwest Area Primary School and Northwest Area Intermediate School. The high school retained its former name, Northwest Area Middle/High School. Later on, the school had some financial problems and then condensed schools to the Primary School, and the Middle/High School.

== Schools ==
- Northwest Area Primary School (grades K–4) in Huntington Mills, formerly Huntington Mills School
- Northwest Area Middle/High School (grades 5–12) in Shickshinny

== Extracurricular activities ==
The district's students have access to a variety of clubs, activities and sports.

=== Journalism & Media Club ===
Starting the 2026-2027 school year, the Northwest Area Journalism & Media Club or The Northwest Insider plan to release newspapers for the school and the community. Submissions are taken by the community for every issue as well. Check out The Northwest Insider

=== Sports ===
Edward "Ed" Gayeski was a long-time coach of the Northwest Rangers basketball team. In his career, he had the most wins among all coaches in Pennsylvania, totaling 744 wins and 195 losses (.792 PCT). Gayeski led the team to become two-time back-to-back PIAA State Class A basketball champions in 1982–83 and 1983–84, going 65–1 in the two years. He also brought the team to 20 wins in 24 of 34 seasons, 13 league titles and 14 District Championships. Gayeski died in summer 1985. The Northwest Area Football Team This Year Has A Score Of 4 Game Won - 5 Games Lost

== Former school buildings ==
=== Garrison Memorial School ===
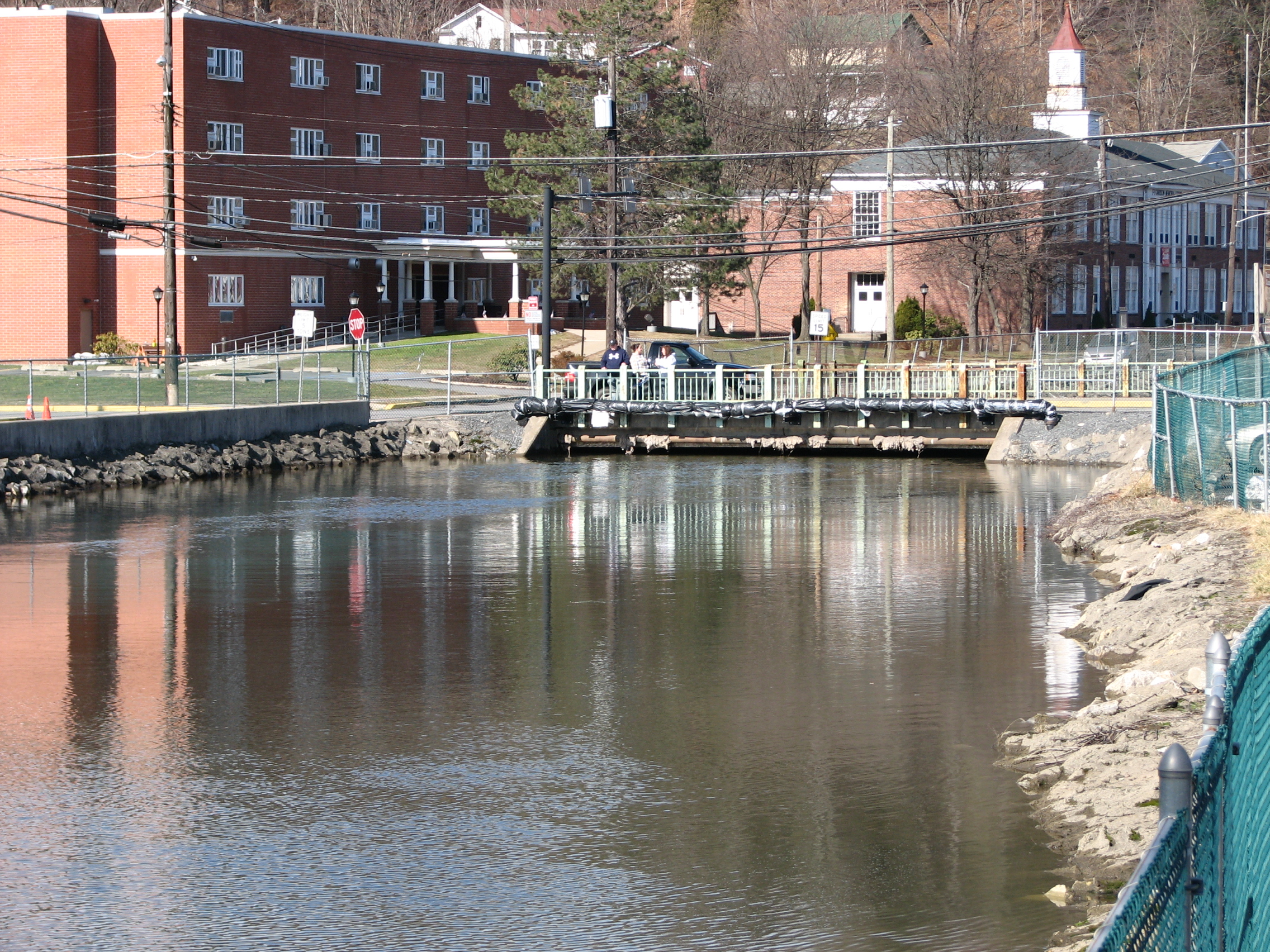
Garrison Elementary School, pictured in the background

The school is located in Shickshinny on West Vine Street.

On May 11, 2010, in a 6–2 vote, the Northwest Area School Board voted to close the Garrison School. Students attending this school were reassigned to the Huntington Mills and Hunlock Creek elementary schools. According to a Times Leader article, the "Garrison was one of the first schools in the district and a high school at one time. Closure of the school will also mean eliminating the Head Start program, which operates from that building."

=== Northwest Area Intermediate School ===
On June 30, 2026, in a unanimous vote, the Northwest Area School Board voted to close the Northwest Area Intermediate School. Students attending this school were reassigned to the Primary School for grades 3-4 and the Middle/High School for grades 5-6. According to a Times article, Superintendent Jason Rushmer said "the sale will immediately bolster the fund balance and potentially increase tax revenue in the long term."
