= Little Shickshinny Creek =

Tributary in Pennsylvania, United States

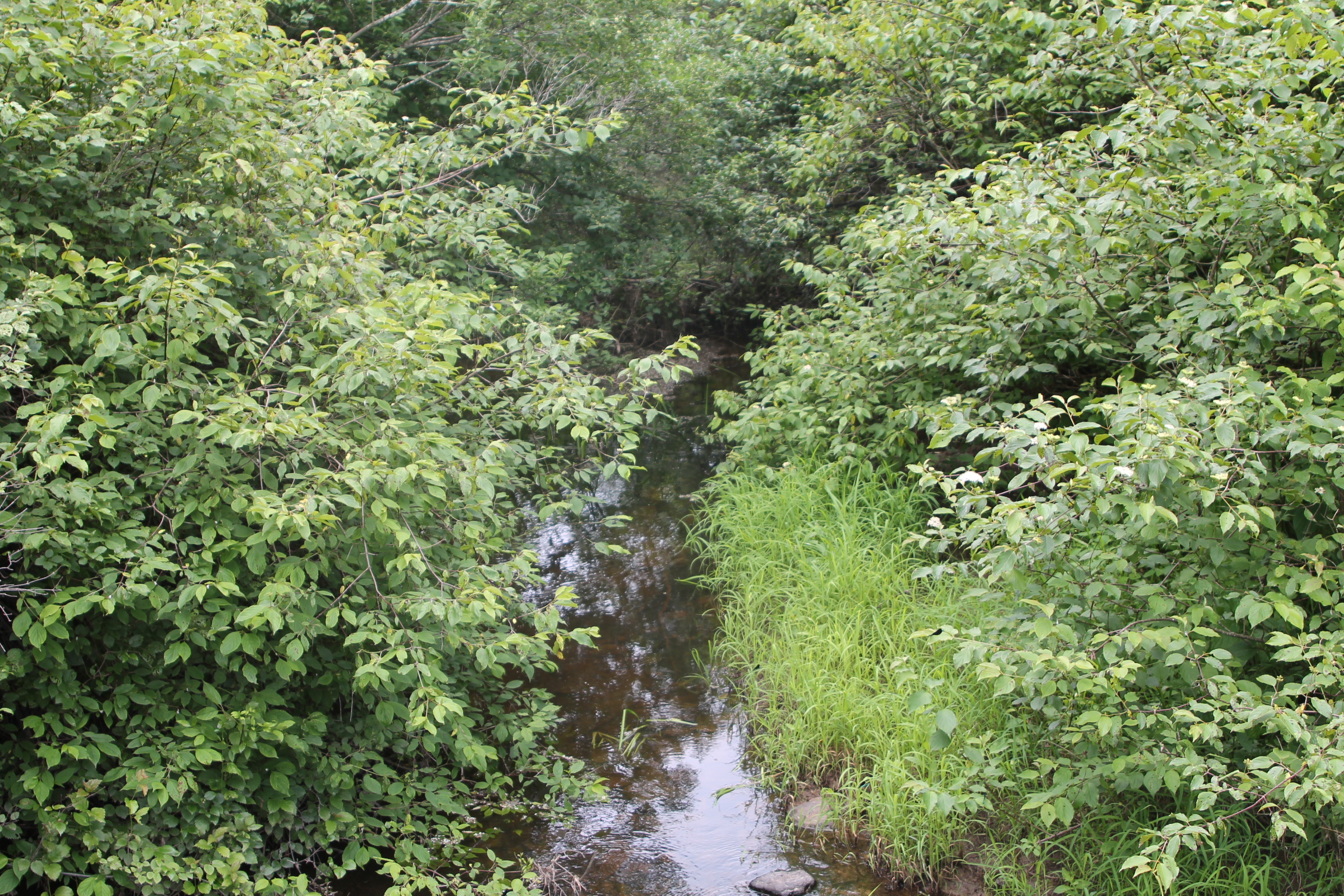
- Little Shickshinny Creek in its middle reaches
- Etymology: Native American word for "quick dashing water"

Physical characteristics
- Source
  - location: Briar Creek Township, Pennsylvania
- Mouth
  - location: Shickshinny Creek in Shickshinny, Pennsylvania
  - coordinates: 41°09′15″N 76°09′17″W
  - elevation: 531 ft (162 m)
- Length: 9.5 mi (15.3 km)
- Basin size: 9.8 mi^{2} (25 km^{2})

Little Shickshinny Creek is a tributary of Shickshinny Creek in Columbia County and Luzerne County, in Pennsylvania, United States. It is 9.5 miles (15.3 km), nearly as long as Shickshinny Creek itself. The creek flows through Briar Creek Township, Columbia County; Salem Township, Luzerne County; and the borough of Shickshinny, in Luzerne County. It is designated as a high-quality coldwater fishery. Pennsylvania State Game Lands #55 and #260 are in the creek's watershed. The watershed has an area of 9.8 square miles, which includes swamps and forests. Waterfalls known as the Little Shickshinny Creek Falls are located on the creek.

== Course ==
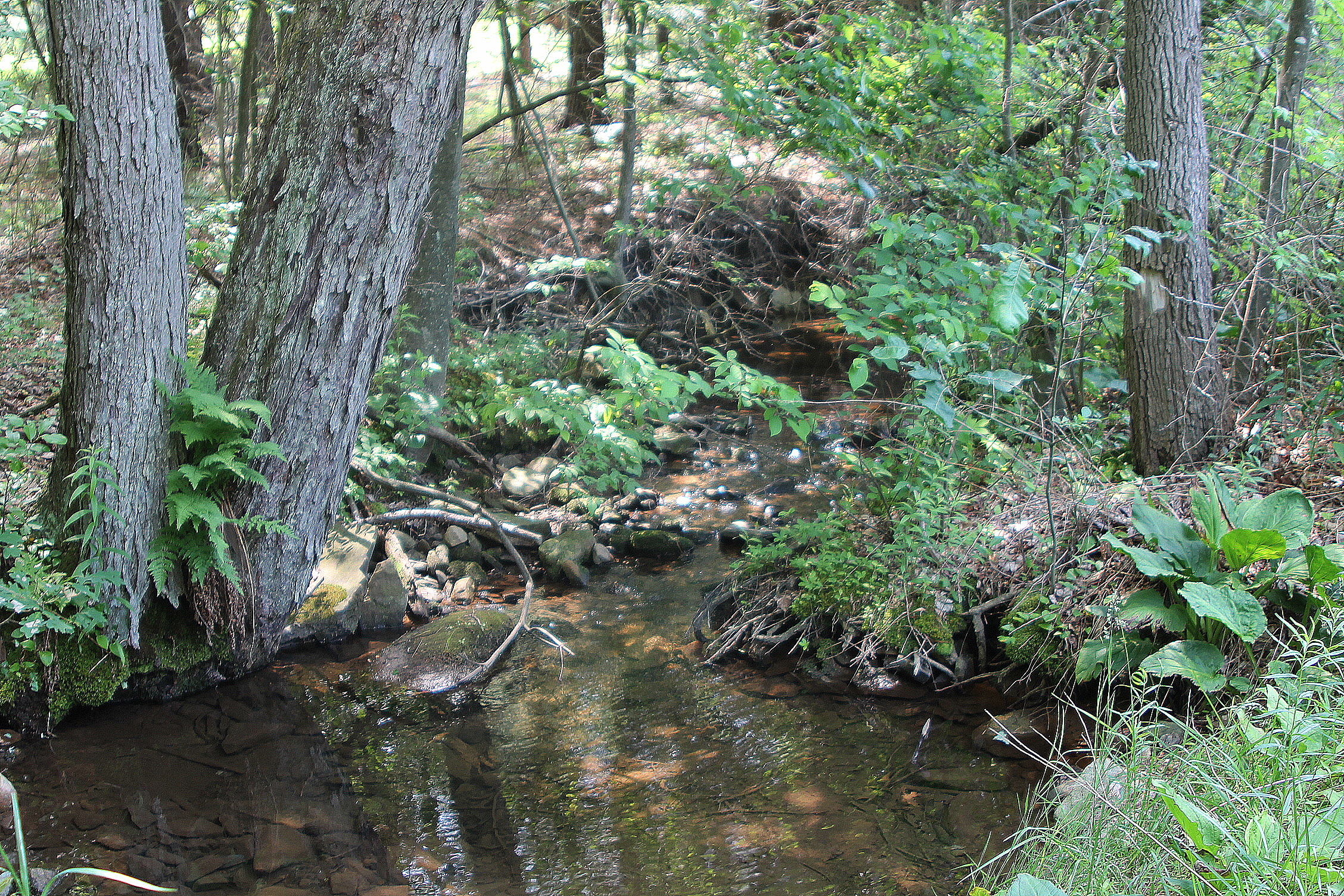
Little Shickshinny Creek near its headwaters

Little Shickshinny Creek begins near the northwestern edge of Briar Creek Township, Columbia County, between Knob Mountain and Huntington Mountain. The creek flows east for a few miles, heading down into a valley between the two aforementioned mountains. The valley broadens gradually and the creek eventually exits Briar Creek Township.

Upon exiting Briar Creek Township, Little Shickshinny Creek enters Salem Township, Luzerne County. Here, it turns northeast and its valley narrows slightly. After a few more miles, the creek reaches the borough of Shickshinny, where it reaches its confluence with Shickshinny Creek.

Little Shickshinny Creek's mouth is 0.46 miles (0.74 km) upstream of the mouth of Shickshinny Creek.

== Watershed and geography ==
The watershed of Little Shickshinny Creek has an area of 9.8 square miles.

There is a reservoir on Little Shickshinny Creek. There is also a swamp and some minor development.

A ridge is located in the vicinity of Little Shickshinny Creek in Columbia County. It is in the State Game Lands #55. Plants inhabiting this area include oaks, birches, laurel, and other species. The land on the northern side of the creek is level and not well-drained.

Little Shickshinny Creek flows through a gorge in Pennsylvania State Game Lands #260. There are also waterfalls on the creek here, which are termed the "Little Shickshinny Creek Falls" by Jeff Mitchell in his book Hiking the Endless Mountains. The waterfalls are 30 to 40 feet (9.1 to 12.2 m) high. Sandstone outcroppings appear near the falls. Varved laclustrine sediments may appear on the northern side of the creek. Its valley has experienced glaciation in the past.

The mouth of Little Shickshinny Creek has an elevation of 531 feet (162 m) above sea level.

== History and etymology ==
An intake dam was built on Little Shickshinny Creek by the Pennsylvania Game Commission. It was 8 feet (2.4 m) tall, 40 feet (12 m), and was used to supply water. The dam was removed in 2009, resulting in increased water quality.

The word shickshinny in Little Shickshinny Creek's name means "quick dashing water".

=== Recreation ===
Recreation in the watershed of Little Shickshinny Creek includes the Pennsylvania State Game Lands #55 and the Camp Louise Girl Scout Camp. The creek also passes through Pennsylvania State Game Lands #260, which has a trail leading to it.

A swimming hole is located on Little Shickshinny Creek.

== Biology ==
Little Shickshinny Creek is designated as a high-quality coldwater fishery. It is home to wild trout and is not stocked. The creek's upper reaches are in the Pennsylvania State Game Lands Number 55.

Habitats along Little Shickshinny Creek include mainly a Hemlock Palustrine Forest Natural Community, but also a red maple swamp, a highbush blueberry shrub swamp, and a dry oak-heath forest. Tree species in the creek's Hemlock Palustrine Forest Natural Community include mainly eastern hemlock, but also black gum, white pine, and beech. Other plants found here include Jack-in-the-pulpit, rhododendron, sensitive fern, skunk cabbage, hay-scented fern, and mountain laurel. The creek's shrub swamps and red maple swamps are home to gray birch, sedge, royal fern, silky dogwood, and numerous others.

Trees found directly on Little Shickshinny Creek and its tributaries include hemlock, black gum, and yellow birch. Other plants found on the banks of the creek include Canada mayflower, rhododendron, cinnamon fern, royal fern, starflower, dwarf ginseng, skunk cabbage, pink lady’s-slipper, and partridge berry.

Little Shickshinny Creek and the surrounding area has a high level of bird biodiversity, which has been described as "exceptional for the area". There are 33 bird species near the creek, including owls, thrushes, flycatchers, and ten warbler species. The creek's headwaters have a high level of plant biodiversity.

The hemlock wooly adelgid inhabits the vicinity of Little Shickshinny Creek.

== See also ==
- Reyburn Creek, next tributary of Shickshinny Creek going upstream
- List of rivers of Pennsylvania
