= George W. Search House =

Historic house in Pennsylvania, United States

- U.S. National Register of Historic Places
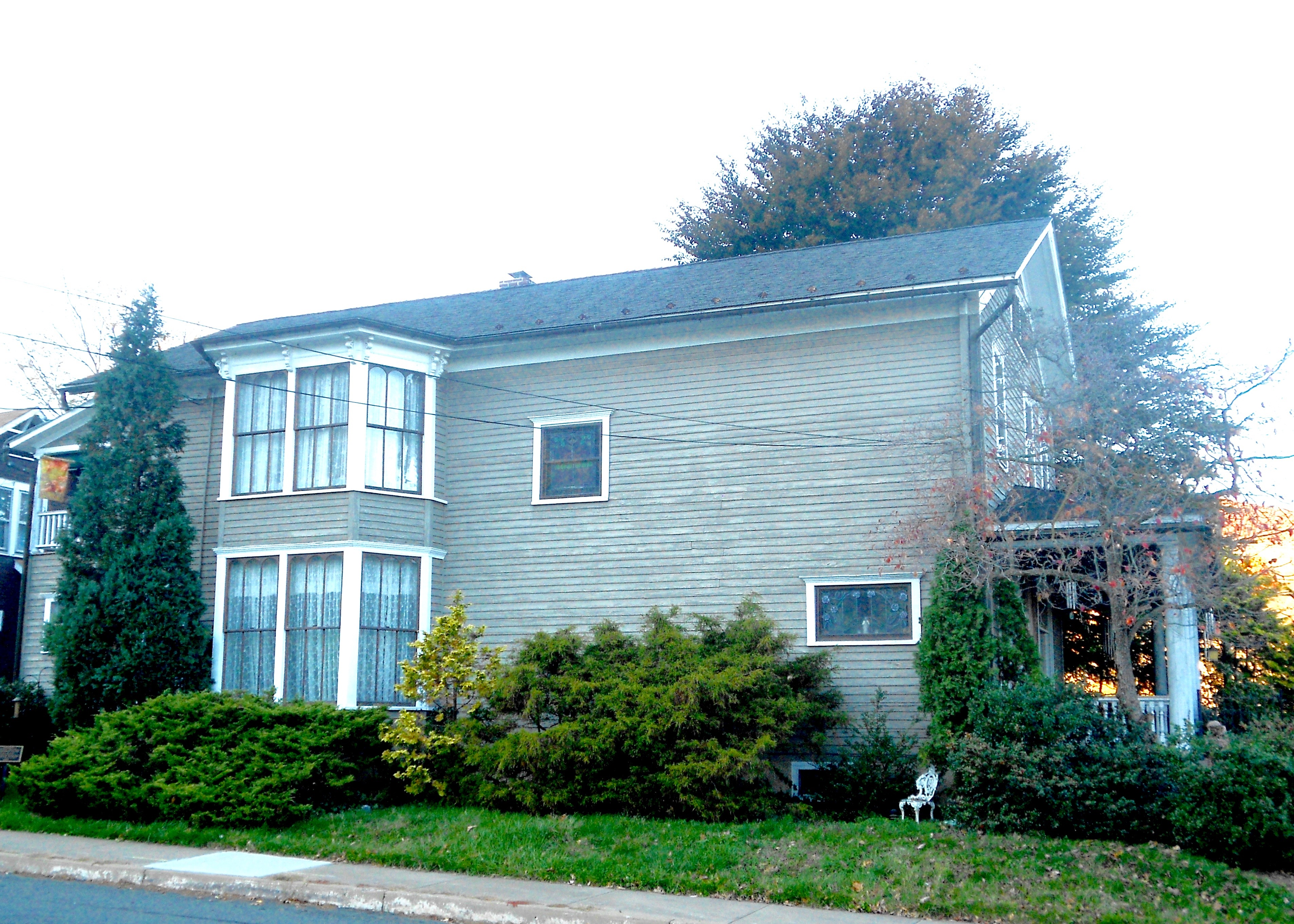

- Location within Pennsylvania Location within the United States
- Location: 56 S. Main St., Shickshinny, Pennsylvania
- Coordinates: 41°9′3″N 76°9′4″W
- Area: less than one acre
- Built: c. 1860, 1916-1928
- Architectural style: Late 19th And 20th Century Revivals
- NRHP reference No.: 09000387
- Added to NRHP: July 10, 2009

The George W. Search House is an historic home that is located in Shickshinny, Luzerne County, Pennsylvania, United States.

It was added to the National Register of Historic Places in 1983.

== History and architectural features ==
Built circa 1860 and altered between 1916 and 1928, this historic structure is a two-story, two-bay-wide, rectangular, gable-front building. It measures twenty-six feet wide by fifty-three feet deep, and is clad in clapboard. It features stained glass windows and a wraparound porch.

== Gallery ==
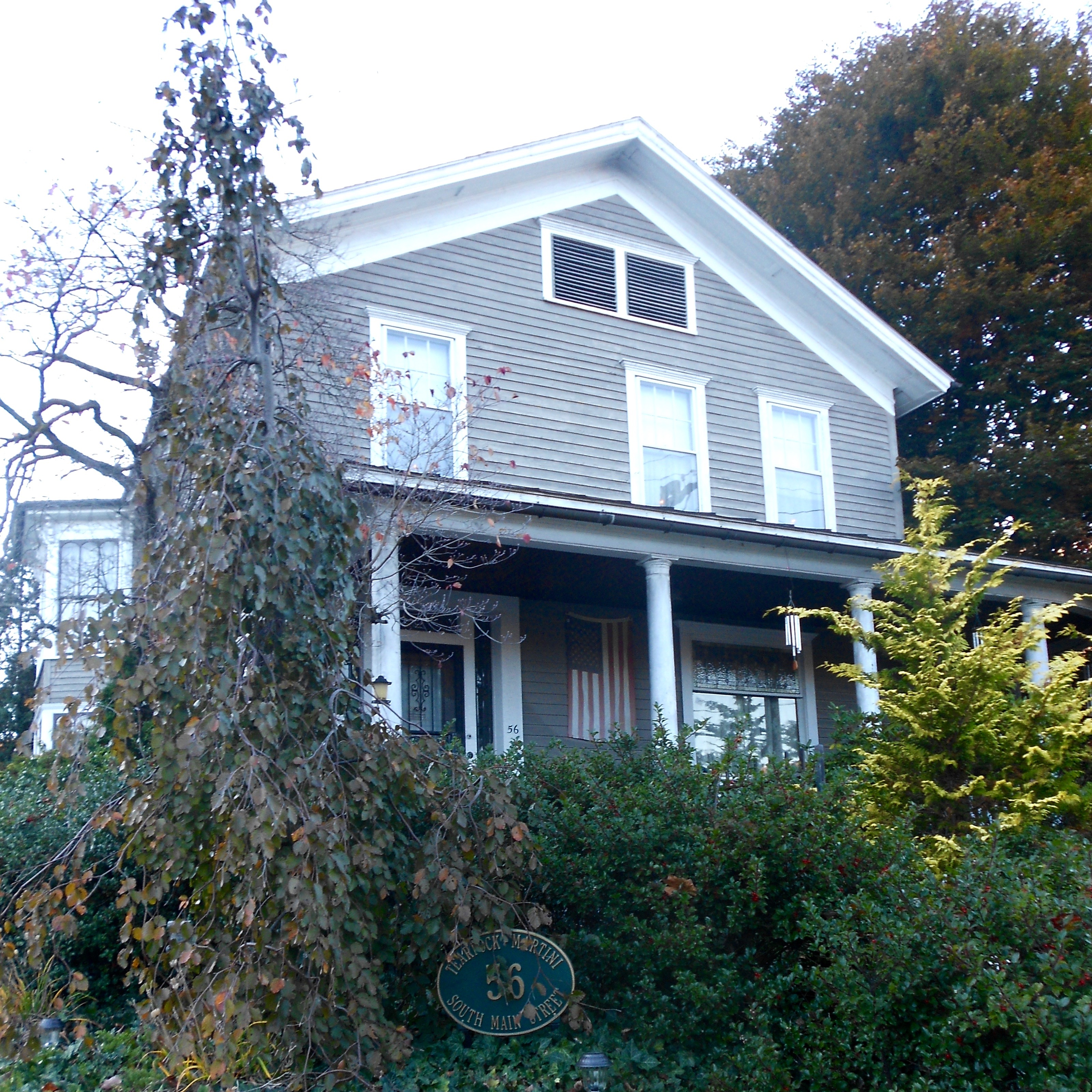
The wraparound porch on the right side was removed
