= Culver Creek (Pennsylvania) =

River in Pennsylvania, United States

Culver Creek Culver's Creek

Physical characteristics
- Source
  - location: Osborn Culver Pond in Ross Township, Luzerne County, Pennsylvania
  - elevation: between 1,120 and 1,140 feet (340 and 350 m)
- Mouth
  - location: Shickshinny Lake on Shickshinny Creek in Union Township, Luzerne County, Pennsylvania
  - coordinates: 41°13′31″N 76°10′59″W
  - elevation: 935 ft (285 m)
- Length: 1.1 mi (1.8 km)
- Basin size: 1.10 mi^{2} (2.8 km^{2})

Basin features
- Progression: Shickshinny Creek → Susquehanna River → Chesapeake Bay

Culver Creek (also known as Culver's Creek) is a tributary of Shickshinny Creek in Luzerne County, Pennsylvania, in the United States. It is approximately 1.1 miles (1.8 km) long and flows through Ross Township and Union Township. The watershed of the creek has an area of 1.10 square miles (2.8 km^{2}). It is designated as a Coldwater Fishery and a Migratory Fishery. The surficial geology along the creek and in its vicinity consists of Wisconsinan Till, Wisconsinan Bouldery Till, alluvial fan, and bedrock consisting of sandstone and shale.

== Course ==
Culver Creek begins in Osborn Culver Pond in Ross Township. It flows south-east for several hundred feet, before turning south-south for several tenths of a mile and entering Union Township. After several tenths of a mile, the creek turns south and then southeast and reaches its confluence with Shickshinny Creek in Shickshinny Lake.

Culver Creek joins Shickshinny Creek 6.72 miles (10.81 km) upstream of its mouth.

== Geography and geology ==
The elevation near the mouth of Culver Creek is 935 feet (285 m) above sea level. The elevation near the creek's source is between 1,120 and 1,140 feet (340 and 350 m) above sea level.

The surficial geology along most of Culver Creek features a glacial or resedimented till known as Wisconsinan Till. There is also a patch of Wisconsinan Bouldery Till near the creek's headwaters and a patch of alluvial fan at its mouth. The surficial geology in the vicinity of the creek also features bedrock consisting of sandstone and shale in a number of places.

== Watershed ==
The watershed of Culver Creek has an area of 1.10 square miles (2.8 km^{2}). The creek is entirely within the United States Geological Survey quadrangle of Shickshinny. It is near the village of Muhlenburg. The creek's headwaters are in a pond, which is known as Osborn Culver Pond and its mouth is in a lake, which is known as Shickshinny Lake.

== History ==
Culver Creek was entered into the Geographic Names Information System on August 2, 1979. Its identifier in the Geographic Names Information System is 1172822.

In 1892, plans were made to construct a stone arch bridge across Culver Creek in Ross Township. This bridge was to cost $250.

== Biology ==
The entire drainage basin of Culver Creek is designated as a Coldwater Fishery and a Migratory Fishery.

== See also ==
- Reyburn Creek, next tributary of Shickshinny Creek going downstream
- List of rivers of Pennsylvania
