= Culver Creek (Ohio) =

Stream in Ohio, U.S.

Coordinates: 40°16′03″N 82°50′18″W

Culver Creek is a stream in the U.S. state of Ohio.

Culver Creek was named for John Culver, a pioneer who settled near it in 1809.

== See also ==
- List of rivers of Ohio
