= Koonsville, Pennsylvania =

Former town in Pennsylvania, U.S.

Coordinates: 41°10′09″N 76°09′39″W

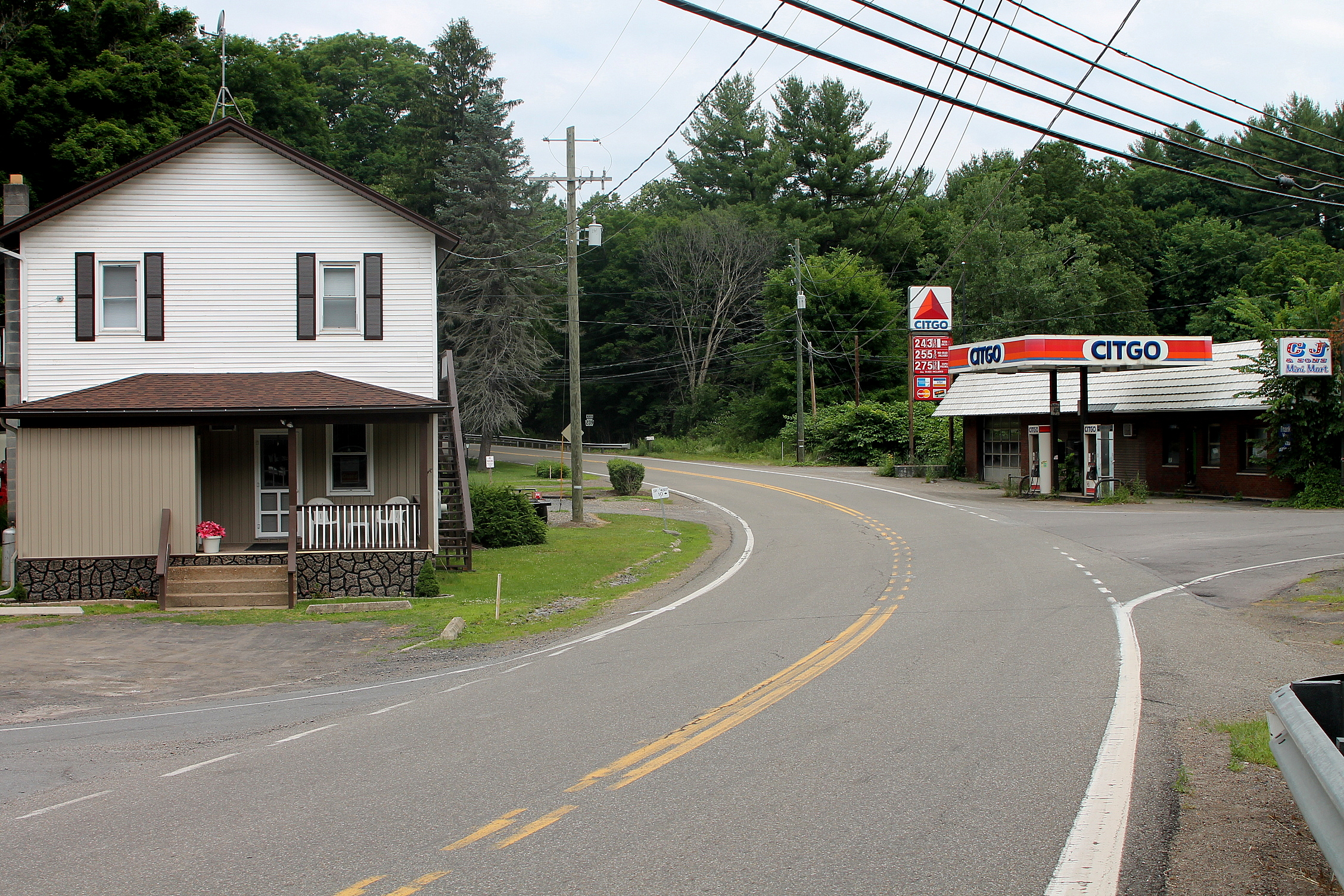
Pennsylvania Route 239 in Koonsville

Koonsville is a former American town that is now a section of Union Township, Luzerne County, Pennsylvania. It is located approximately one mile outside Shickshinny, along Route 239 and McKendree Road. Its elevation is approximately 616 feet (188 m).

== History ==
Formerly known as Arch Bridge, this town was named for the stone bridge that crosses Shickshinny Creek. It served as a logging community until the Battle of Wyoming in 1778, when most of the white settlers fled their homes, fearing Iroquois raids. Several farmers and loggers returned a few years later to rebuild, including Shadrick Austin, who bought 256 acres (1.04 km^{2}) of land and, in 1801, established the Austin Family Inn.

Upon the establishment of the post office in 1850, the area was incorporated and renamed as Koonsville to honor William Koons, the town's first postmaster, who had moved to the area and occupied the Austin family inn that year.

That post office was decommissioned at the beginning of World War II; Koonsville is now serviced by the Shickshinny post office.
