= Huntington Mills, Pennsylvania =

Village in Pennsylvania, US

Coordinates: 41°11′26″N 76°14′01″W

Huntington Mills is a village in Huntington Township, Luzerne County, Pennsylvania, United States. Its ZIP Code is 18622.

== History ==
Huntington Mills is named after Samuel Huntington, a signer of the Declaration of Independence.

== Geography ==
Huntington Mills is located in the center of Huntington Township. The village is very small. The "center" of town is marked by a local mom-and-pop general store, the post office (built on the foundations of one of the old mills), an elementary school, doctor's office, Christmas tree farm, and the volunteer fire company. The town is bisected by one major road, PA 239, and two creeks (Kitchen Creek and Huntington Creek).

== Economy ==
Farming is a major way of life in and around Huntington Mills. The milk farms, which proliferated only twenty years ago, are in considerable decline. Farmers have begun to prefer growing hay, tomatoes, and feed-corn. There are half a dozen Christmas tree farms within the township.
