= Union Township, Luzerne County, Pennsylvania =

Township in Pennsylvania, US

Coordinates: 41°12′00″N 76°09′59″W

- Township
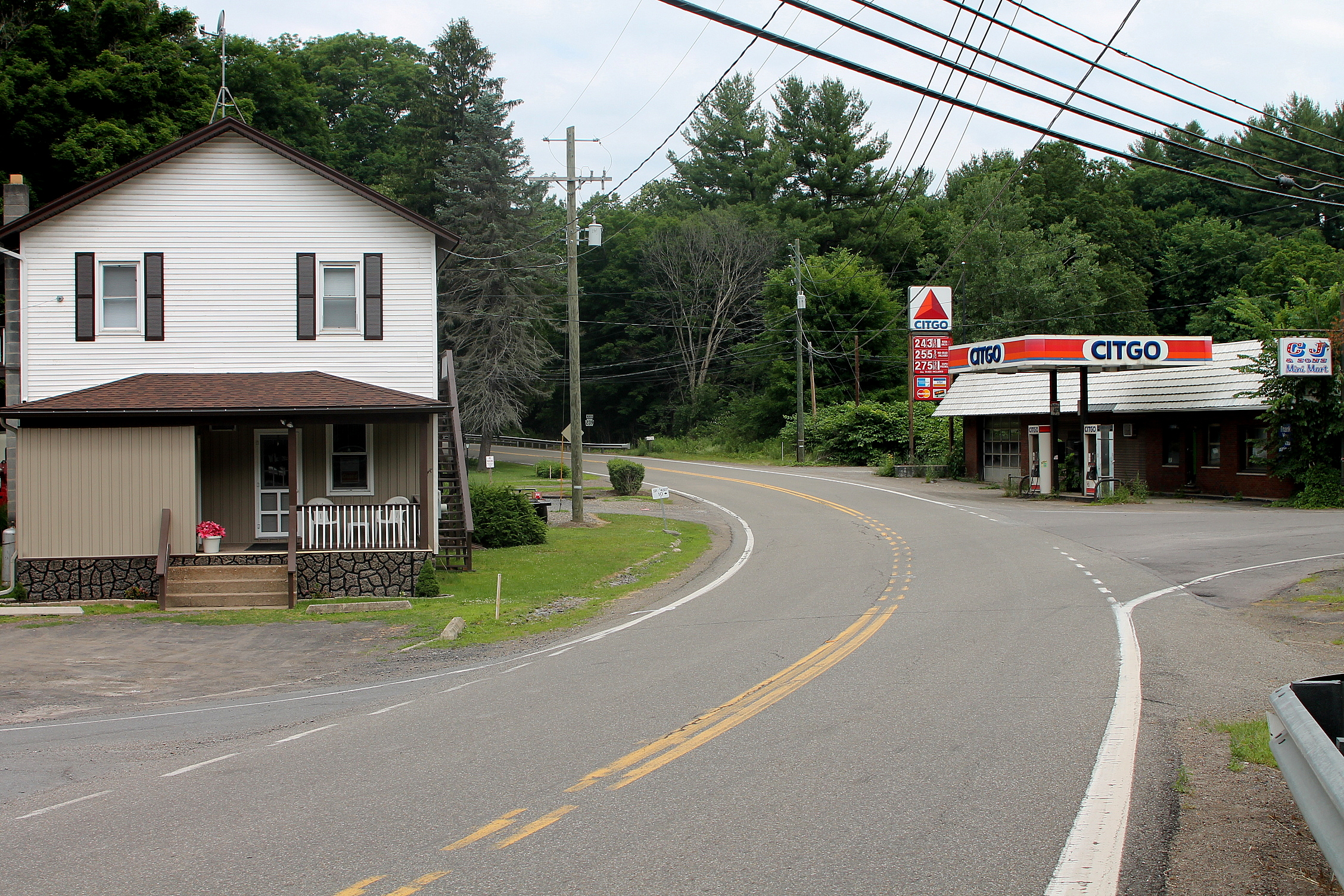
- PA 239 in Koonsville

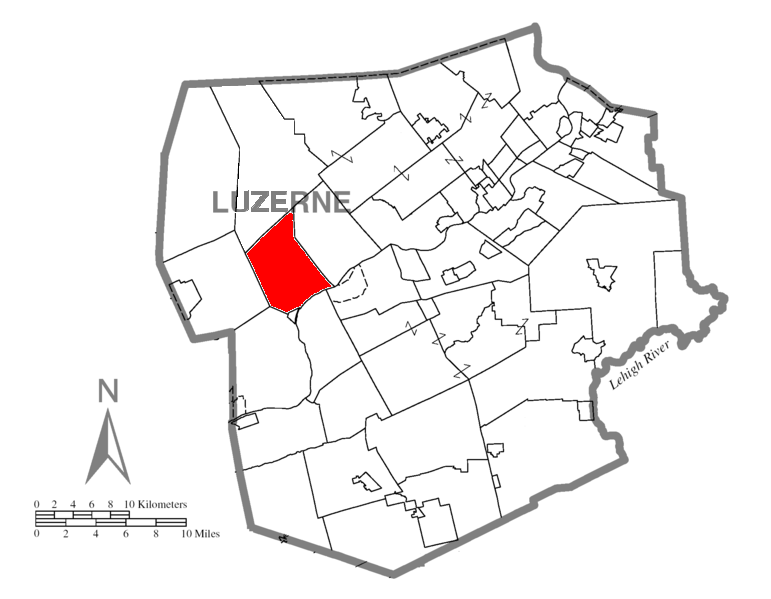
- Map of Luzerne County highlighting Union Township

- Map of Pennsylvania highlighting Luzerne County
- Country: United States
- State: Pennsylvania
- County: Luzerne

Area
  - Total: 20.05 sq mi (51.94 km^{2})
  - Land: 19.68 sq mi (50.97 km^{2})
  - Water: 0.38 sq mi (0.98 km^{2})

Population (2020)
  - Total: 2,033 ▼
  - Estimate (2021): 2,038
  - Density: 102.4/sq mi (39.54/km^{2})
- Time zone: UTC-5 (Eastern (EST))
  - Summer (DST): UTC-4 (EDT)
- FIPS code: 42-079-78384
- Website: https://uniontwpluzernecopa.gov/

Union Township is a township in Luzerne County, Pennsylvania, United States. The population was 2,033 at the 2020 census.

== History ==
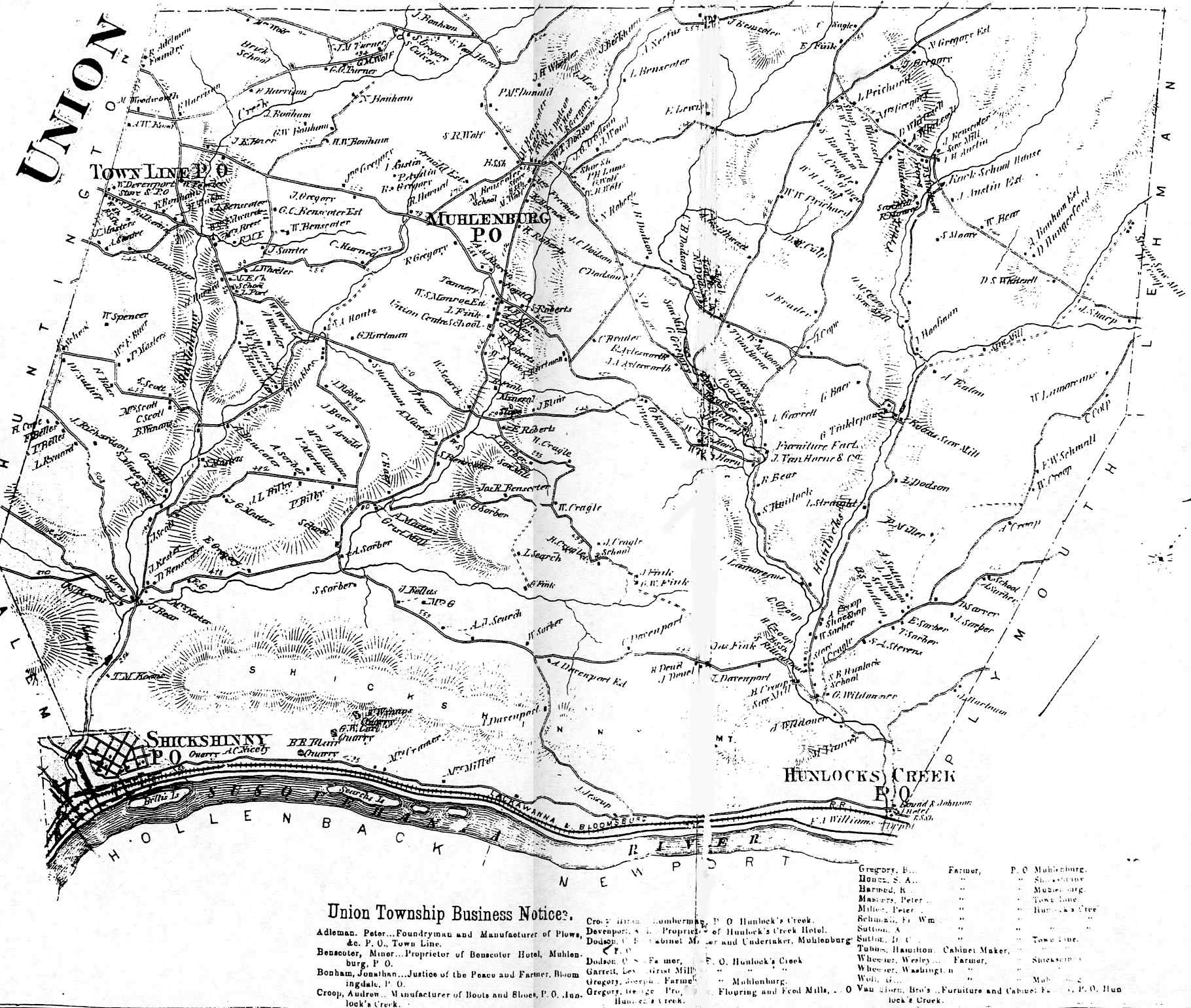
An old map of Union Township

Union Township was formed from a piece of Huntington Township in July 1813. The first settlements, outside of what is now Shickshinny, were erected by George Fink and Peter Gregory in 1790. Other settlers, most of whom were from Connecticut, followed in their footsteps. The first sawmills in the territory were later constructed along Shickshinny Creek.

=== Koonsville ===
Koonsville is a former logging town in Union Township. Most of the white settlers, fearing Iroquois raids, fled their homes after the Battle of Wyoming in 1778. Several white farmers and loggers returned a few years later to rebuild; this included Shadrick Austin, who bought 256 acres (1.04 km2) of land. In 1801, he established the Austin Family Inn. In 1850, William Koons moved into the area and occupied the Austin family Inn. A post office was built the same year. William Koons served as its first postmaster. The community was later given the name Koonsville (in honor of William Koons).

== Geography ==
According to the United States Census Bureau, the township has a total area of 20.0 square miles (51.9 km^{2}), of which 19.7 square miles (51.0 km^{2}) is land and 0.39 square miles (1.0 km^{2}), or 1.88%, is water. The southeastern border is defined by the Susquehanna River. Shickshinny Mountain, a forested ridge, runs along the riverbank. Huntington Mountain defines the southernmost boundary of the township. Shickshinny Creek forms a gorge as it flows between the two ridges. Koonsville is located along the creek (in the southern half of the township). U.S. 11 and PA 239 travel through the southern portion of Union. The northern half of the municipality is made up of hills and small farming communities (e.g., Muhlenburg and Town Line).

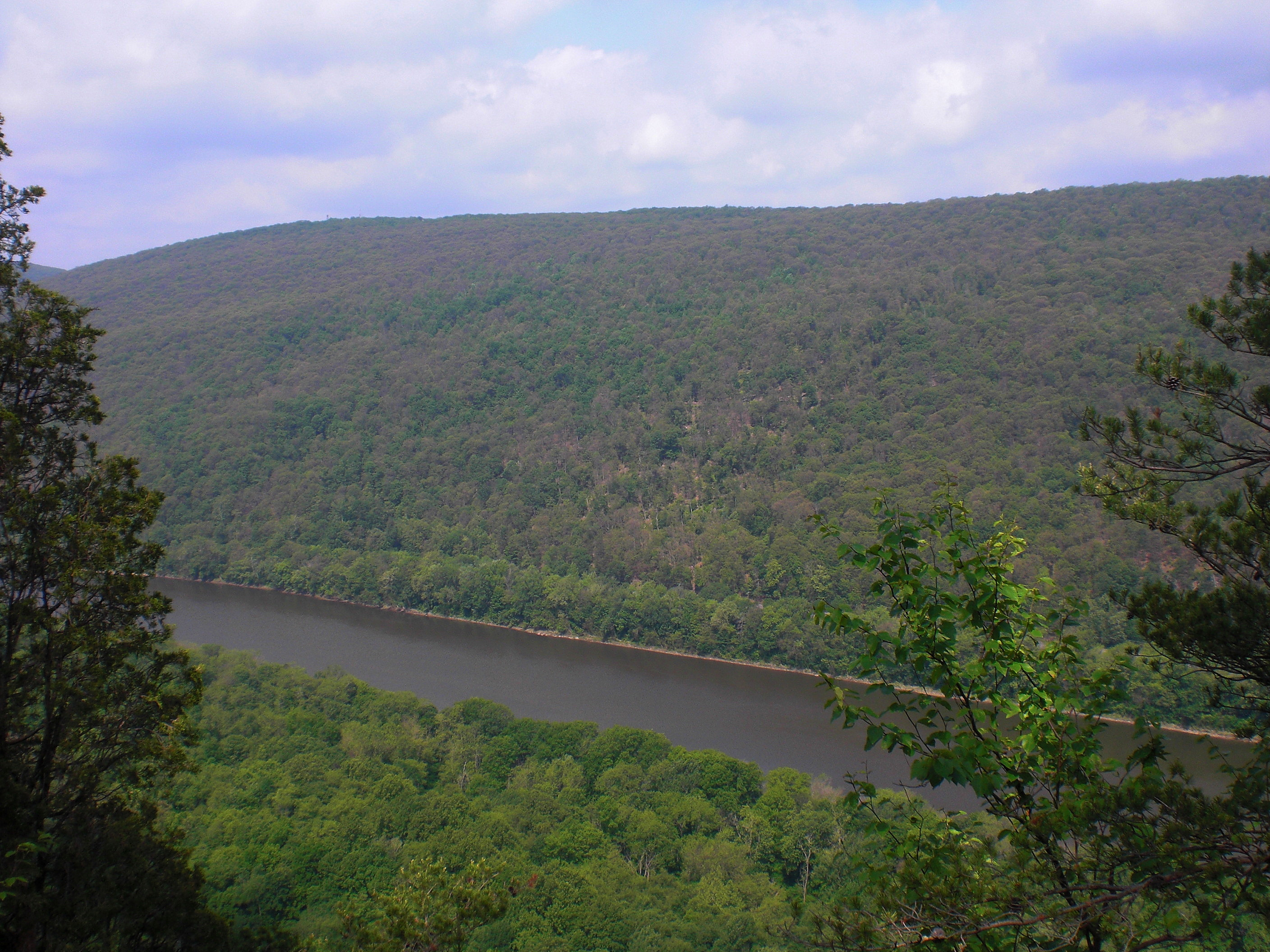
The Susquehanna River and Shickshinny Mountain

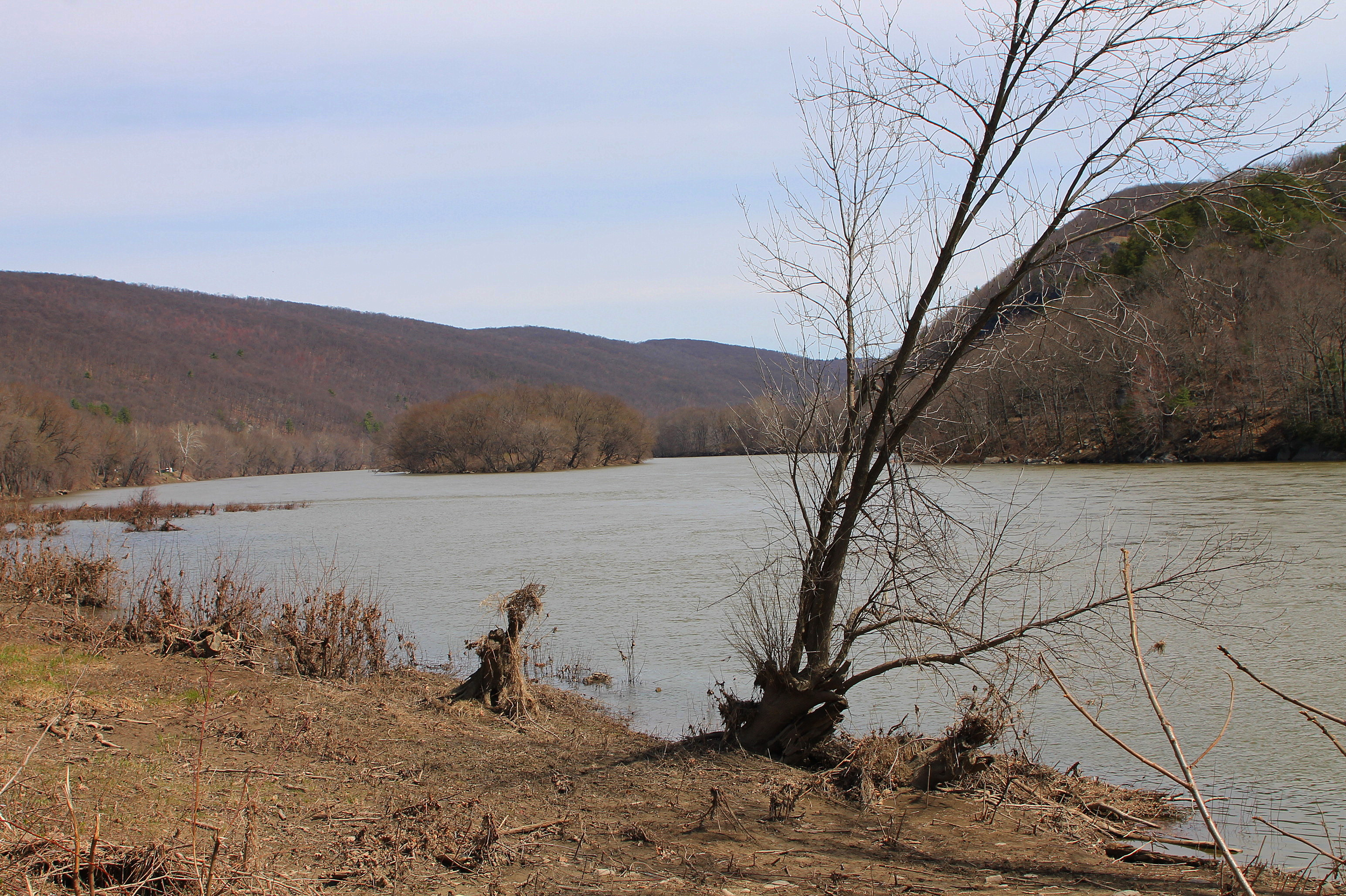
The Susquehanna River (Shickshinny Mountain is on the left)

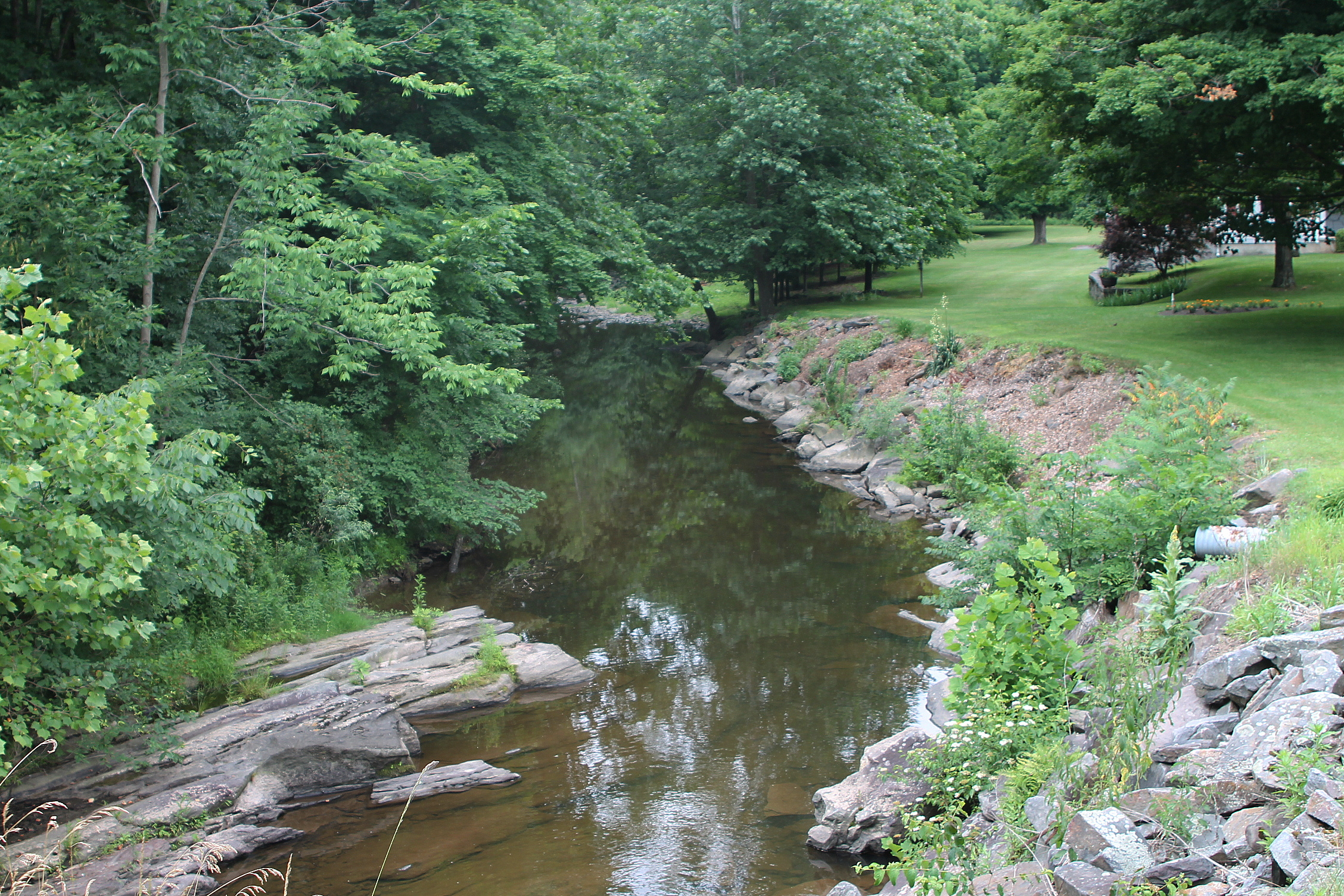
Shickshinny Creek near Koonsville

== Demographics ==
Historical population
Census	Pop.	Note	%±
2000	2,100		—
2010	2,042		−2.8%
2020	2,033		−0.4%
2021 (est.)	2,038		0.2%
U.S. Decennial Census

As of the census of 2000, there were 2,100 people, 769 households, and 602 families residing in the township. The population density was 105.5 inhabitants per square mile (40.7/km^{2}). There were 857 housing units at an average density of 43.1 per square mile (16.6/km^{2}). The racial makeup of the township was 99.29% White, 0.14% African American, 0.10% Native American, 0.24% Asian, and 0.24% from two or more races. Hispanic or Latino of any race were 0.52% of the population.

There were 769 households, out of which 30.4% had children under the age of 18 living with them, 66.8% were married couples living together, 6.6% had a female householder with no husband present, and 21.7% were non-families. 17.7% of all households were made up of individuals, and 7.5% had someone living alone who was 65 years of age or older. The average household size was 2.63 and the average family size was 2.97.

In the township the population was spread out, with 24.3% under the age of 18, 5.5% from 18 to 24, 28.1% from 25 to 44, 26.6% from 45 to 64, and 15.5% who were 65 years of age or older. The median age was 40 years. For every 100 females there were 103.1 males. For every 100 females age 18 and over, there were 96.5 males.

The median income for a household in the township was $45,136, and the median income for a family was $47,321. Males had a median income of $36,486 versus $21,806 for females. The per capita income for the township was $18,323. About 4.4% of families and 7.8% of the population were below the poverty line, including 5.7% of those under age 18 and 2.5% of those age 65 or over.

== Education ==
Union Township is part of the Northwest Area School District.
