= List of Army Black Knights men's basketball seasons =

The Army Black Knights men's basketball team competes in Division I of the National Collegiate Athletic Association (NCAA), representing United States Military Academy in the Patriot League. Army has played its home games at Christl Arena in West Point, New York since 1985.

== Seasons ==
Statistics overview
| Season | Coach | Overall | Conference | Standing | Postseason |
|---|---|---|---|---|---|
Army (Division I) (Independent) (1902–1979)
| 1902–03 | Joseph Stilwell | 1–0 | | | |
| 1903–04 | Joseph Stilwell | 2–1 | | | |
| 1904–05 | | 3–4 | | | |
| 1905–06 | | 7–4 | | | |
| 1906–07 | Harry Fisher | 9–5 | | | |
| 1907–08 | B.H. Koehler | 9–3 | | | |
| 1908–09 | Joseph Stilwell | 9–2 | | | |
| 1909–10 | Joseph Stilwell | 14–1 | | | |
| 1910–11 | Joseph Stilwell | 9–3 | | | |
| 1911–12 | Harvey Higley | 8–4 | | | |
| 1912–13 | Harvey Higley | 11–2 | | | |
| 1913–14 | Joseph Stilwell | 5–7 | | | |
| 1914–15 | Jacob Devers | 11–2 | | | |
| 1915–16 | Jacob Devers | 5–7 | | | |
| 1916–17 | Arthur Conrad | 3–8 | | | |
| 1917–18 | Ivens Jones | 8–4 | | | |
| 1918–19 | Ivens Jones | 3–5 | | | |
| 1919–20 | Joseph O'Shea | 12–2 | | | |
| 1920–21 | Joseph O'Shea | 18–5 | | | |
| 1921–22 | Harry Fisher | 17–2 | | | |
| 1922–23 | Harry Fisher | 17–0 | | | |
| 1923–24 | Van Vleit | 16–2 | | | |
| 1924–25 | Harry Fisher | 12–3 | | | |
| 1925–26 | Ernest Blood | 11–6 | | | |
| 1926–27 | Leo Novak | 11–3 | | | |
| 1927–28 | Leo Novak | 10–5 | | | |
| 1928–29 | Leo Novak | 12–5 | | | |
| 1929–30 | Leo Novak | 9–6 | | | |
| 1930–31 | Leo Novak | 12–3 | | | |
| 1931–32 | Leo Novak | 10–5 | | | |
| 1932–33 | Leo Novak | 5–5 | | | |
| 1933–34 | Leo Novak | 8–7 | | | |
| 1934–35 | Leo Novak | 10–5 | | | |
| 1935–36 | Leo Novak | 7–7 | | | |
| 1936–37 | Leo Novak | 7–6 | | | |
| 1937–38 | Leo Novak | 12–2 | | | |
| 1938–39 | Leo Novak | 13–2 | | | |
| 1939–40 | Valentine Lentz | 11–4 | | | |
| 1940–41 | Valentine Lentz | 5–11 | | | |
| 1941–42 | Valentine Lentz | 10–6 | | | |
| 1942–43 | Valentine Lentz | 5–10 | | | |
| 1943–44 | Edward Kelleher | 15–0 | | | |
| 1944–45 | Edward Kelleher | 14–1 | | | |
| 1945–46 | Stewart Holcomb | 9–6 | | | |
| 1946–47 | Stewart Holcomb | 9–7 | | | |
| 1947–48 | John Mauer | 8–9 | | | |
| 1948–49 | John Mauer | 7–10 | | | |
| 1949–50 | John Mauer | 9–8 | | | |
| 1950–51 | John Mauer | 9–8 | | | |
| 1951–52 | Elmer Ripley | 8–9 | | | |
| 1952–53 | Elmer Ripley | 11–8 | | | |
| 1953–54 | Bob Vanatta | 15–7 | | | |
| 1954–55 | Orvis Sigler | 9–9 | | | |
| 1955–56 | Orvis Sigler | 10–13 | | | |
| 1956–57 | Orvis Sigler | 7–13 | | | |
| 1957–58 | Orvis Sigler | 13–12 | | | |
| 1958–59 | George Hunter | 14–10 | | | |
| 1959–60 | George Hunter | 14–9 | | | |
| 1960–61 | George Hunter | 17–7 | | | NIT 1st Round |
| 1961–62 | George Hunter | 10–11 | | | |
| 1962–63 | George Hunter | 8–11 | | | |
| 1963–64 | Tates Locke | 19–7 | | | NIT Semifinals |
| 1964–65 | Tates Locke | 21–8 | | | NIT Semifinals |
| 1965–66 | Bob Knight | 18–8 | | | NIT Semifinals |
| 1966–67 | Bob Knight | 13–8 | | | |
| 1967–68 | Bob Knight | 20–5 | | | NIT 1st Round |
| 1968–69 | Bob Knight | 18–10 | | | NIT Semifinals |
| 1969–70 | Bob Knight | 22–6 | | | NIT Semifinals |
| 1970–71 | Bob Knight | 11–13 | | | |
| 1971–72 | Dan Dougherty | 11–13 | | | |
| 1972–73 | Dan Dougherty | 11–13 | | | |
| 1973–74 | Dan Dougherty | 6–18 | | | |
| 1974–75 | Dan Dougherty | 3–22 | | | |
| 1975–76 | Mike Krzyzewski | 11–14 | | | |
| 1976–77 | Mike Krzyzewski | 20–8 | | | |
| 1977–78 | Mike Krzyzewski | 19–9 | | | NIT 1st Round |
| 1978–79 | Mike Krzyzewski | 14–11 | | | |
Army (Division I) (ECACM) (1979–1981)
| 1979–80 | Mike Krzyzewski | 9–17 | | | |
| 1980–81 | Pete Gaudet | 7–19 | | | |
Army (Division I) (MAAC) (1981–1990)
| 1981–82 | Pete Gaudet | 5–22 | 0–10 | | |
| 1982–83 | Les Wothke | 11–18 | 2–8 | | |
| 1983–84 | Les Wothke | 11–17 | 4–10 | | |
| 1984–85 | Les Wothke | 16–13 | 7–7 | | |
| 1985–86 | Les Wothke | 9–18 | 5–9 | | |
| 1986–87 | Les Wothke | 14–15 | 8–6 | | |
| 1987–88 | Les Wothke | 9–19 | 4–10 | | |
| 1988–89 | Les Wothke | 12–16 | 6–8 | | |
| 1989–90 | Les Wothke | 10–19 | 5–11 | | |
Army (Division I) (Patriot) (1990–present)
| 1990–91 | Tom Miller | 6–22 | 3–9 | | |
| 1991–92 | Tom Miller | 4–24 | 2–12 | | |
| 1992–93 | Mike Conners | 4–22 | 2–12 | | |
| 1993–94 | Dino Gaudio | 7–20 | 4–10 | | |
| 1994–95 | Dino Gaudio | 12–16 | 4–10 | | |
| 1995–96 | Dino Gaudio | 7–20 | 2–10 | | |
| 1996–97 | Dino Gaudio | 10–16 | 4–8 | | |
| 1997–98 | Pat Harris | 8–19 | 2–10 | | |
| 1998–99 | Pat Harris | 8–19 | 4–8 | | |
| 1999–00 | Pat Harris | 5–23 | 2–10 | | |
| 2000–01 | Pat Harris | 9–19 | 3–9 | | |
| 2001–02 | Pat Harris | 12–16 | 6–8 | | |
| 2002–03 | Jim Crews | 5–22 | 0–14 | | |
| 2003–04 | Jim Crews | 6–21 | 3–11 | | |
| 2004–05 | Jim Crews | 3–24 | 1–13 | | |
| 2005–06 | Jim Crews | 5–22 | 1–13 | | |
| 2006–07 | Jim Crews | 15–16 | 4–10 | | |
| 2007–08 | Jim Crews | 14–16 | 6–8 | | |
| 2008–09 | Jim Crews | 11–19 | 6–8 | | |
| 2009–10 | Zach Spiker | 14–15 | 4–10 | | |
| 2010–11 | Zach Spiker | 11–19 | 3–11 | | |
| 2011–12 | Zach Spiker | 12–18 | 5–9 | | |
| 2012–13 | Zach Spiker | 16–15 | 8–6 | | |
| 2013–14 | Zach Spiker | 15–16 | 10–8 | | |
| 2014–15 | Zach Spiker | 15–15 | 6–12 | | |
| 2015–16 | Zach Spiker | 19–14 | 9–9 | | CIT 1st Round |
| 2016–17 | Jimmy Allen | 13–19 | 6–12 | | |
| 2017–18 | Jimmy Allen | 13–17 | 6–12 | | |
| 2018–19 | Jimmy Allen | 13–19 | 8–10 | | |
| 2019–20 | Jimmy Allen | 15–15 | 10–8 | | |
| 2020–21 | Jimmy Allen | 12–10 | 7–7 | | |
| 2021–22 | Jimmy Allen | 15–16 | 9–9 | | |
| 2022–23 | Jimmy Allen | 17–16 | 10–8 | | |
| 2023–24 | Kevin Kuwik | 10–22 | 6–12 | | |
| 2024–25 | Kevin Kuwik | 16–14 | 10–8 | | |
| 2025–26 | Kevin Kuwik | 11–21 | 5–13 | | |
| Total: | | 1330–1363 | 221–432 | | |
