= List of Army Black Knights men's basketball head coaches =

The following is a list of Army Black Knights men's basketball head coaches. The Black Knights have had 32 head coaches in their 121-season history.

Army's current head coach is Kevin Kuwik. He was hired in March 2023 to replace Jimmy Allen, who was fired at the end of the 2022–23 season.

No.	Tenure	Coach	Years	Record	Pct.
1	1902–1904; 1907–1911; 1913–1914	Joseph Stilwell	7	49–17	.742
–	1904–1906	No coach	2	10–8	.556
2	1906–1907; 1921–1923; 1924–1925	Harry A. Fisher	1	55–10	.846
3	1911–1913	Harvey Higley	2	19–6	.760
4	1914–1916	Jacob L. Devers	2	16–9	.640
5	1916–1917	Arthur Conard	1	3–8	.273
6	1917–1919	Ivens Jones	2	11–9	.550
7	1919–1921	Joseph O'Shea	2	30–7	.811
8	1923–1924	John Van Vliet	1	16–2	.889
9	1925–1926	Ernest Blood	1	11–6	.647
10	1926–1939	Leo Novak	13	126–61	.674
11	1939–1943	Valentine Lentz	4	31–31	.500
12	1943–1945	Ed Kelleher	2	29–1	.967
13	1945–1947	Stu Holcomb	2	18–13	.581
14	1947–1951	John Mauer	4	33–35	.485
15	1951–1953	Elmer Ripley	2	19–17	.528
16	1953–1954	Bob Vanatta	1	15–7	.682
17	1954–1958	Orvis Sigler	4	39–47	.453
18	1958–1963	George Hunter	5	63–48	.568
19	1963–1965	Tates Locke	2	40–15	.727
20	1965–1971	Bob Knight	6	102–50	.671
21	1971–1975	Dan Dougherty	4	31–66	.320
22	1975–1980	Mike Krzyzewski	5	73–59	.553
23	1980–1982	Pete Gaudet	2	12–41	.226
24	1982–1990	Les Wothke	8	92–135	.405
25	1990–1993 (Note: Army fired Tom Miller on February 4, 1993. Mike Connors served as interim coach for the remainder of the season.)	Tom Miller	3	13–61	.176
26	1993*	Mike Connors	1	1–7	.125
27	1993–1997	Dino Gaudio	4	36–72	.333
28	1997–2002	Pat Harris	5	42–96	.304
29	2002–2009	Jim Crews	7	59–140	.296
30	2009–2016	Zach Spiker	7	102–112	.477
31	2016–2023	Jimmy Allen	7	98–112	.467
32	2023–present	Kevin Kuwik	0	0–0	–
Totals		32 coaches	121 seasons	1,294–1,308	.497
Records updated through end of 2022–23 season * - Denotes interim head coach. Source
