= Bristol Virginia Public Schools =

School district in Virginia, United States

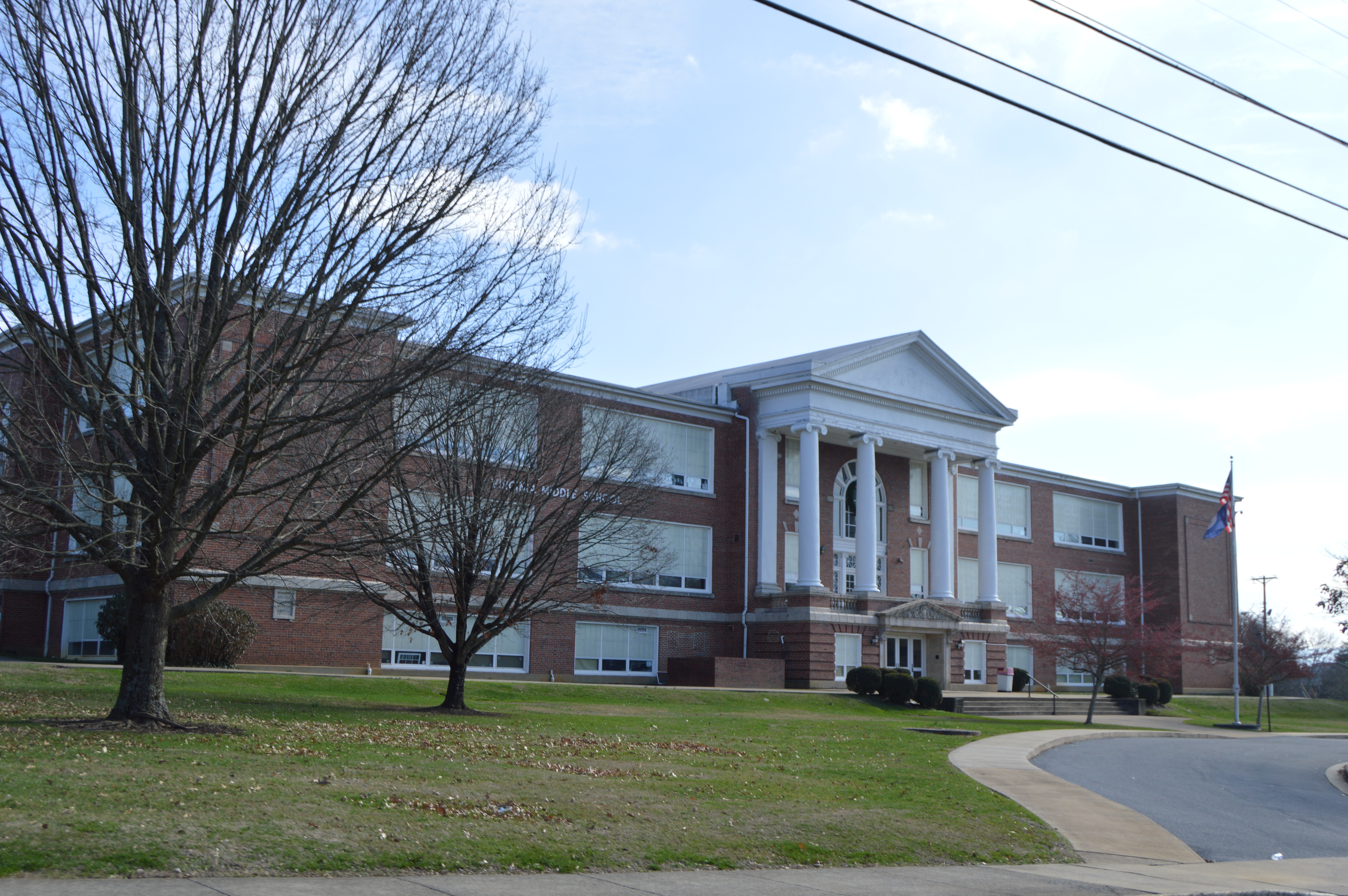
- Virginia Middle School

Location
- 280 Lee Street; Bristol, Virginia 24201
- Coordinates: 36.5982322°N 82.182079°W

District information
- Superintendent: Stephanie Austin
- Chair of the board: Vanessa Guffey
- Schools: 4

Bristol Virginia Public Schools (BVPS) is the school division for Bristol, Virginia.

== Schools ==
Secondary:

- Virginia High School
- Virginia Middle School

Elementary:

- Virginia Intermediate School
- Virginia Primary School

== See also ==
- Bristol Tennessee City Schools - School district of the majority of Bristol, Tennessee
  - Tennessee High School - The high school of that district
