= John Cropp =

American football coach (born 1939)

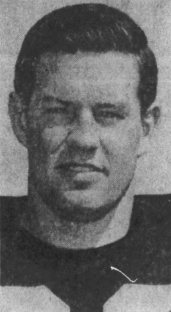
- John Cropp in 1959

Biographical details
- Born: 1939 (age 86–87); Wolf Point, Montana, U.S.
- Education: Vanderbilt University (1961)

Playing career
- 1957–1961: Vanderbilt
- 1963: Seventh Army Support Command
- Positions: Guard, linebacker

Coaching career (HC unless noted)
- 1963: Seventh Army Support Command (line)
- 1965: V Corps
- 1965–1966: Southwest HS (GA) (line)
- 1967–1972: Tennessee HS (TN)
- 1973–1974: Vanderbilt (WR/TE)
- 1975–1977: Texas Tech (WR/TE)
- 1978–1982: Ole Miss (OC)
- 1983: Duke (OC/OB)
- 1984: Vanderbilt (OB)
- 1985: Vanderbilt (OC)
- 1991: Kentucky (TE)
- 1992–1993: Kentucky (RC)

Administrative career (AD unless noted)
- ?–1973: Tennessee HS (TN)
- 1988–1991: Vanderbilt (assistant AD)
- 1991–2013: Kentucky (assoc. AD)

Head coaching record
- Overall: 6–3 (military) (Note: Seventh U.S. Army Football League); 48–15–3 (high school)

Accomplishments and honors

Awards
- Tennessee Sports Hall of Fame (2015)

John Williamson Cropp (born 1939) is an American former college and high school football coach and athletics administrator.

== Early life, playing career, and military career ==
Cropp was born in 1939 in Wolf Point, Montana. His father, Albert H. Cropp, was a missionary for the American Indians and was of German descent. Cropp's father's position caused their family to move all over the western half of the country, from Arizona, Oklahoma, and Huron, South Dakota, where his family lived for two years at the start of high school before moving a final time to Maryville, Tennessee, following Cropp's sophomore year. While attending Maryville High School, he played high school football, served as captain of the basketball team, and was the catcher for the baseball team.

Alongside moving constantly, Cropp also changed positions in football, serving as a fullback for his freshman and sophomore years, a wingback for his junior year, and an end for his senior season. He was eventually recruited as a linebacker and received a scholarship to Vanderbilt University. The position changes didn't stop in college, as Cropp transitioned from linebacker on the freshmen team in 1957 to the third-string left guard in 1958.

During Cropp's sophomore season, he suffered a broken toe, which inevitably led to him taking a redshirt year. In 1959, he received a slight concussion that caused him to miss five days, but unlike the previous year, he didn't fall behind and was poised to continue playing. In 1960, he missed time with a sprained ankle. After his senior year, he was honored with the Wade-Looney Award, which goes to the Vanderbilt player who had the greatest improvement over their career.

Cropp graduated from Vanderbilt University in 1961 with a degree in geology, alongside earning his teaching certification to become a football coach following his graduation. After he earned his degree in geology, Cropp began working on his Master of Business Administration.

From 1962 to 1965, Cropp served as a lieutenant in the United States Army and was stationed in Germany. While serving in Germany, he was a member of the Seventh Army Support Command football team, which played in the Europe Football Conference, which consisted of ten teams across western Germany and France.

== Coaching career ==
Cropp's first coaching position was as a player-coach for the Seventh Army Support Command, where he served as the team's line coach in 1963. After not coaching in 1964, he returned as the head football coach for the V Corps, where he led the Guardians to a 6–3 record and finished third in the Seventh U.S. Army Football League.

Following Cropp's discharge from the Army in early 1964, he began coaching as the head line coach for Southwest High School in Atlanta. After two seasons, he was hired as the head football coach for Tennessee High School, as he succeeded Fred Keller. Cropp's inaugural team finished with a 5–5 record. Alongside serving as the head football coach, Cropp also served as the school's athletic director during his tenure. After an undefeated state championship season, he turned down an offer to become an assistant football coach at his alma mater, Vanderbilt. In 1972, Cropp led Tennessee to a second consecutive undefeated state championship. He interviewed for the head coaching position at Austin Peay State University.

Cropp was eventually not chosen for the Austin Peay position, but was instead hired as the wide receivers and tight ends coach for his alma mater, Vanderbilt, under new head coach Steve Sloan In 1975, Sloan accepted the head coach position at Texas Tech, where he took Cropp and four other assistants, including Rex Dockery and Bill Parcells, with him. Cropp followed Sloan again when Sloan was hired as the head coach for Ole Miss, but this time, Cropp was promoted to offensive coordinator. In 1983, Cropp followed Sloan for a final time, this time to Duke, where Cropp was initially demoted to just the offensive backfield coach before being promoted back to offensive coordinator.

After a combined 11 seasons alongside Sloan, Cropp resigned from Duke and returned to Vanderbilt as the offensive backfield coach. He was promoted to offensive coordinator before the 1985 season. He resigned after the season. He didn't coach for two years before returning to Vanderbilt in 1988 as an assistant athletic director. Before his return to Vanderbilt, Cropp applied for the head coaching vacancy at East Tennessee State, but was ultimately not hired.

Cropp returned to coaching in 1991 as the tight ends coach under Bill Curry at Kentucky. For the following two seasons, he served as the recruiting coordinator before retiring from coaching. He retained his position as associate athletic director. Cropp remained at Kentucky until his retirement in 2013.

== Personal life ==
Cropp and his wife, Mary Ann, have two children and three grandchildren. Cropp is a Christian, and was active in the Fellowship of Christian Athletes during his stint as head football coach for Tennessee High School.

Following Cropp's retirement from the University of Kentucky, he was honored as the namesake for the school's softball stadium, John Cropp Stadium.

== Head coaching record ==
=== High school ===
Year	Team	Overall	Conference	Standing	Bowl/playoffs
Tennessee Vikings () (1967–1968)
1967	Tennessee	5–5			
1968	Tennessee	4–5–1			
Tennessee Vikings (District 1-AAA) (1969–1972)
1969	Tennessee	4–4–2	3–4–1		
1970	Tennessee	10–1	8–0	1st	
1971	Tennessee	12–0	8–0	1st	
1972	Tennessee	13–0	8–0	1st	
Tennessee:		48–15–3	27–4–1		
Total:		48–15–3			
National championship Conference title Conference division title or championship game berth
