= Kenneth Ogbe =

German basketball player (born 1994)

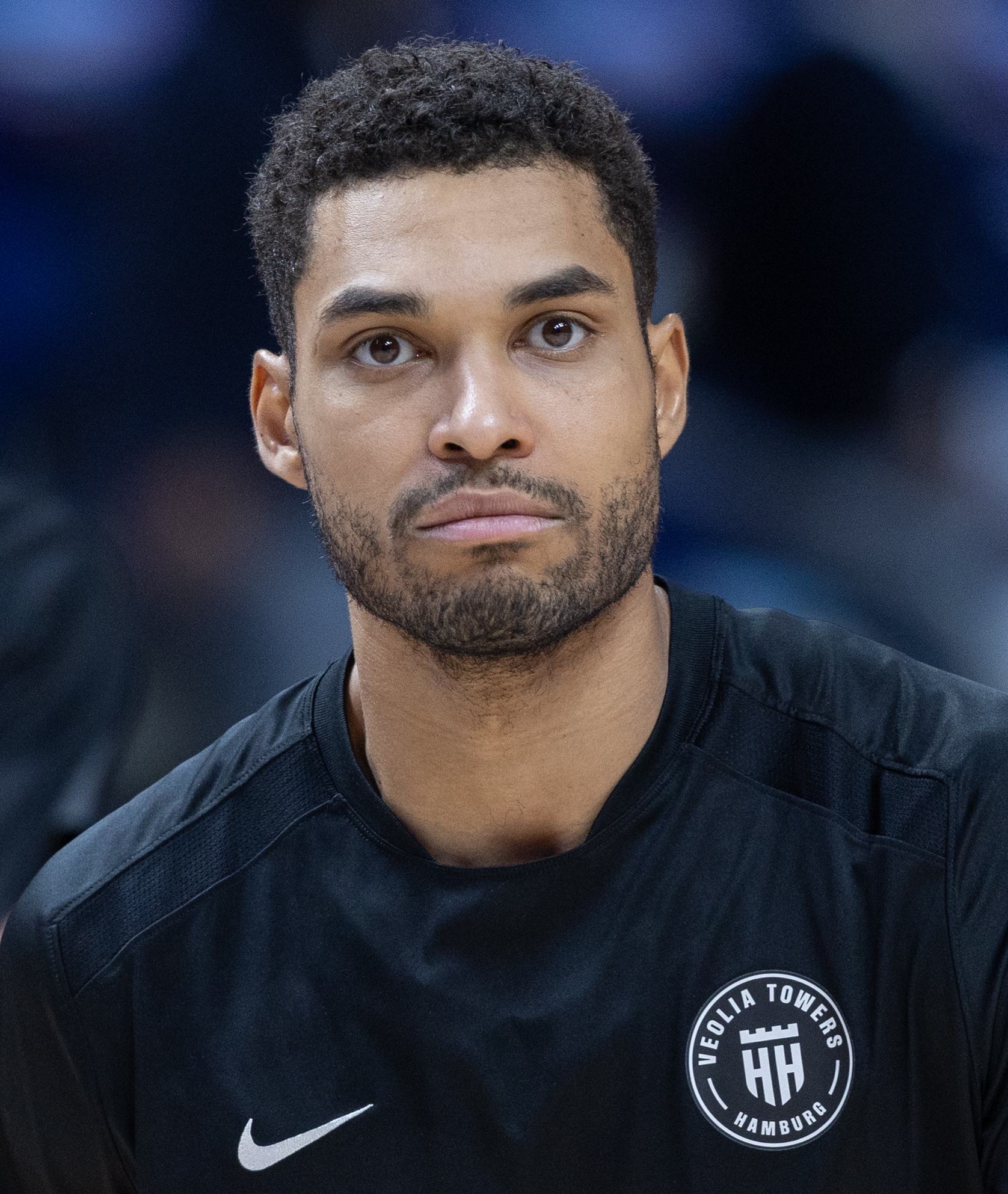
- Ogbe in 2026

No. 25 – Veolia Towers Hamburg
- Position: Shooting guard
- League: Basketball Bundesliga

Personal information
- Born: 16 November 1994 (age 31) Munich, Germany
- Listed height: 1.98 m (6 ft 6 in)
- Listed weight: 86 kg (190 lb)

Career information
- College: Utah (2013–2016); Utah Valley (2016–2018)
- NBA draft: 2018: undrafted
- Playing career: 2012–present

Career history
- 2012–2013: Ehingen Urspring
- 2018–2020: Alba Berlin
- 2020–2022: Brose Bamberg
- 2022–2024: EWE Baskets Oldenburg
- 2024–present: Hamburg Towers

Career highlights
- German League champion (2020); German Cup winner (2020); First-team All-WAC (2018)

Kenneth Ogbe (born 16 November 1994) is a German professional basketball player for Hamburg Towers of the Basketball Bundesliga (BBL).

== Early life ==
Ogbe was born in Munich, the son of a Nigerian father and German mother. He grew up in Ehingen, Germany and played basketball for the youth team of Ehingen Urspring. He was named the MVP of the 2012 Arby's Classic after scoring 24 points with eight rebounds in the championship game as Ehingen became the first international team to win the tournament.

== College career ==
Ogbe began his collegiate career at the University of Utah. He played in 30 games as a reserve and average 2.9 points and 1.1 rebounds per game during his first year. As a sophomore, Ogbe averaged 4.5 points and 1.4 rebounds per game off the bench. His play was hampered by osteitis pubis, an inflammation in the pubic bone, making them more susceptible to damage. He played in five games as a junior before suffering a season-ending injury and using a medical redshirt. After the season, Ogbe opted to leave the program and transfer to Utah Valley University. He took nine classes in the summer so he could be a graduate transfer.

Ogbe was granted immediate eligibility after transferring and became a starter during his redshirt junior season, averaging 10.6 points per game. As a redshirt senior, Ogbe started all 33 of the Wolverines' games and averaged 13.7 points and 3.2 rebounds per game and was named first team All-Western Athletic Conference. In two seasons at UVU, he scored 802 points and finished with the second highest three-point field goal percentage in school history at 41.9 percent.

== Professional career ==
=== Alba Berlin ===
Prior to the 2018 NBA draft, Ogbe worked out with the Utah Jazz. Ogbe signed a contract with Alba Berlin of the Basketball Bundesliga on 22 June 2018. He averaged 3.9 points and 1.8 rebounds in 30 BBL games and 2.3 points and 1.2 rebounds in 18 Eurocup games.

=== Brose Bamberg ===
On 17 July 2020, he has signed with Brose Bamberg of the Basketball Bundesliga (BBL). Ogbe averaged 6.9 points and 3.3 rebounds per game in 2021–22 Basketball Bundesliga.

=== Ewe Baskets Oldenburg ===
On 9 June 2021, Ogbe signed with EWE Baskets Oldenburg of the German Basketball Bundesliga (BBL).

=== Hamburg Towers ===
On 17 June 2024, he signed with Hamburg Towers of the Basketball Bundesliga.

== National team career ==
In 2013 and 2014, Ogbe competed in the U20 European Championship with the German junior national team. In 2015 he was first appointed to the A2 national team. Ogbe made his debut for the senior German national team during the qualification rounds for EuroBasket 2022, where he played in four games and averaged 7.5 points and 4.5 rebounds per game. He later represented Germany in two games during the 2023 FIBA Basketball World Cup European Qualifiers.
