= High school football national championships =

U.S. high school sports award

Seattle High School football team, "Interscholastic Champions of the United States" in 1906.

1920 Everett High School football team, U.S. champions.

A national championship in high school football is an honor awarded annually by various organizations to their selection of the best high school football team in the United States.

The title is a mythical national championship, since travel demands and the number of high schools spread across the country prevent the championship from being settled competitively on the football field. Instead, the national championships are based on rankings from prep football media analysts, such as USA Today, or algorithmic rankings.

There have also been some efforts over the years at organizing a single-game playoff for the national championship.

== History ==
The oldest of the rating systems, the National Sports News Service, was begun by Arthur H. "Art" Johlfs—who originally started naming champions informally in 1927 as a 21 year old high school coach and official, but did so more formally starting in 1959 after enlarging his network of supporting hobbyists to receive reports from six separate areas of the country. One of those hobbyists was Barrett Conley "Barry" Sollenberger, who represented the NSNS' Southwest Sports News Service regional office. Sollenberger was the facilitator of a similar poll for Joe Namath's National Prep Sports magazine in 1976 and 1977, before the publication was later discontinued. Its Hertz Trophy was awarded each year to Moeller High School in Cincinnati, which also was both of NSNS' top picks. Johlfs respected the way that Sollenberger actively ran his southwest office, and he turned NSNS rankings over to him in 1979.

The NSNS poll then remained under Sollenberger's management through 1999; along the way, he also retroactively picked back as far as 1910, although at least one source has the NSNS even making a 1904 selection.. It was then merged away into R. Douglas "Doug" Huff's year-old, competing FAB 50 poll starting in 2000—which in turn continued on through 2014 with Mark J. Tennis apparently retaining the rights to it. An early compilation listing of NSNS champions does not necessarily match a more recent listing. It is not immediately clear if these discrepancies are due to poor record-keeping, or if Sollenberger or Huff adjusted the list of champions over the years as new information came to light—or if they simply just disagreed with Johlfs' picks. Johlfs described how he arrived at choosing a champion: he accepted input from Minnesota college and professional coaches, reviewed game statistics, films, and press clippings, and considered the school's enrollment size. Johlfs said that his picks initially tended to be midwestern schools but shifted southward, because southern schools tended to play more games and were also allowed to compete in postseason playoffs. He was also known to keep a champion as the top-ranked team indefinitely in subsequent seasons' rankings as long as another team had not beaten them yet; this ended up allowing multiple teams to repeat as champions, drawing some criticism to Johlfs. Sollenberger, on the other hand, primarily determined champions by attending prominent games in person, while also consulting college football coaching staffs. He further acknowledged factoring in teams' past histories and their success in the larger population centers of the day when considering teams for his poll—usually including three teams from California and two teams each from Illinois, Ohio, Pennsylvania, and Texas in his rankings. Notably, Florida had a relatively sizable number of repeat champions in Johlfs' rating system but saw a significant drop in its number of champions under Sollenberger. As for Huff, he too had his own unique way of determining champions: "I try to put credibility in the listings by making them consistent with local and state rankings. I try to look for dominant teams in an area who have a good track record."

Informal intersectional games deemed as "national championship games" by the two participating schools were also, on occasion, sometimes played. Sometimes a dominant team in one state would defeat a dominant team in a neighboring state after the regular season and then would self-claim the national championship. However, sometimes such a game could not be scheduled, like in 1936 after Washington of Massillon, Ohio, refused to withhold its black players in a proposed game with segregated Central of Knoxville, Tennessee. Central subsequently proclaimed itself national champion that year. On December 31, 1938, duPont Manual of Louisville, Kentucky, and New Britain of Connecticut played in an actual national championship game at Tiger Stadium in Baton Rouge, Louisiana with a formal, third-party sponsor, the Louisiana Sports Association–and, by extension, the Sugar Bowl Committee, which held a series of sporting events leading up to the Sugar Bowl game itself. Manual won, 28–20.

The following year, on December 30, 1939, the game featured Pine Bluff High School in Pine Bluff, Arkansas, which defeated Baton Rouge Magnet High School in Baton Rouge, Louisiana 26–0. This series of games proved difficult to organize, due to some states' prohibition of postseason play; Pine Bluff, for example, had to receive a special waiver from its state's high school sports association to participate in the game (even some schools that were eligible for postseason games like Massillon Washington were unable to play in the contest, since their association only allowed postseason games through the month of November). Also in 1939, the National Sports Council, chaired by columnist Grantland Rice, staged a national championship game Christmas night in the Miami Orange Bowl, won by Garfield of New Jersey, 16-13, over Miami of Florida; unlike the LSA Game, it featured two undefeated and untied teams from different sections of the country. After World War II the National Federation of State High School Associations also began discouraging intersectional postseason games.

== Team and coaching superlatives ==
Concord, California De La Salle won 12 total national championships from 1994 to 2015, including 6 in a row from 1998 to 2003.

The first 10 of De La Salle's titles were coached by Bob Ladouceur, including all of those acquired during the 6-year streak. Todd Dodge (Southlake, Texas Carroll from 2004 to 2006 and Austin, Texas Westlake in 2020) is the only head coach to lead 2 different schools to national championships. Tony Sanchez (Las Vegas, Nevada Bishop Gorman in 2014) and Kenny Sanchez (Bishop Gorman in 2015 and 2016) are the only brothers to lead a school to a national championship.

At 63 years, McKinley (Canton, Ohio) holds the record for longest span between first title (1934) and most recent (1997). Bruce Rollinson of Mater Dei High School (Santa Ana, California) holds the largest span for a coach with 27 years between first title (1994) and last (2021) with 4 additional outright or shared titles during that span (1996, 2017, 2018, 2020).

== Selectors ==
=== Current selectors ===
Selector	Type	Since
USA Today	Expert	1982
MaxPreps/CBS Sports	Expert	2005
hsratings.com (MaxPreps Computer)	Algorithm	2003
High School Football America/NFL Play Football	Algorithm/ Expert	2012
Massey Ratings/On3	Algorithm	2010
BlueStar Media	Expert	2012
SBLive/Sports Illustrated	Expert	2020

=== Historical selectors ===
Selector	Year(s)
National championship game (NCG)*	1897, 1902–1904, 1906, 1908, 1910–1916, 1919–1920, 1922–1927, 1929, 1932–1933, 1937
Simon Lyons (SL)	1900, 1902–1903, 1906, 1908–1909, 1916, 1924, 1937, 1975–1976, 1978
Tim Hudak (TH)	1902–1904, 1906, 1908–1909, 1916, 1919, 1937
National Sports News Service (NSNS)**	1904, 1910–1916, 1918–1943, 1946–1999, 2014
Boston Evening Transcript (BET)	1912
High School Sports History (HSSH)	1917, 1944–1945, 1956–1958
National High School Football Coaches (NHSFC)	1932
Louisiana Sports Association National High School Championship (LSANHSC)	1938–1939
National Sports Council Health Bowl (NSCHB)	1939
Imperial Sports Syndicate (ISS)	1962
Art Judge's SWEET 33 (AJS33)	1976
National Prep Sports Network (NPSN); Southwest Sports News Service (SSNS)	1976–1977; 1978
**USA Today Super 25 (USATS25)**	**1982–present**
World Features Syndicate National Prep Poll (WFSNPP); PrepNation National Prep Poll (PNNPP)	1987–2014; 2015–2019
USA High School Football (USAHSF); USA High School Football Private Schools (USAHSFPrS)†; USA High School Football Public Schools (USAHSFPuS)†	1995–2012; 2013; 2013
Dick Butkus Football Network (DBFN)	1998–2001
Tony Bianco National High School Football Poll (TBNHSFP)	1998–2006
American Football Monthly (AFM); American Football Monthly Private Schools (AFMPrS)‡ American Football Monthly Public Schools (AFMPuS)‡	1999–2004; 2005; 2005
Fox FAB 50 (FF50)**; StudentSports FAB 50 (SSF50) ESPN HIGH Elite 25 (ESPNHE25); ESPN RISE FAB 50 (ESPNRF50); ESPN HS FAB 50 (ESPNHSF50); Powerade FAB 50 (PF50); FAB 50 (F50)	1999–2000; 2001–2005 2007; 2007–2010; 2011; 2012; 2013–2014
**hsratings.com (HSR)** CalPreps (CP); CalPreps Freeman Computer Rankings (CPFCR)	**2025–present** 2003–2024; 2004–2010
**MaxPreps Xcellent 25 (MPX25)**; **MaxPreps Small Schools (MPSS)**; MaxPreps Medium Schools (MPMS)	**2005–present** 2010–2016, **2018–present** 2012–2013
BlueStar Media Go-To 25 (BSMGT25); **BlueStar Media Elite 25 (BSME25)**	2012–2013; **2014–present**
Rivals FAB 50 (RF50) Rivals High 100 (RH100)	2006 2008–2012
**Massey Ratings (MR)**	**2010–present**
Sports Illustrated (SI) **SBLive/Sports Illustrated Power 25 (SBLP25)**	2011–2012; **2020–present**
Prep Force (PF)	2012–2019
High School Football America Top 25 (HSFAT25); High School Football America National Top 50 (HSFANT50) High School Football America Medium Schools Top 25 (HSFAMST25) High School Football America Small Schools Top 25 (HSFASST25) High School Football America National Top 100 (HSFANT300) **High School Football America** **National Top 300 (HSFANT300)**	2012–2014; 2015–2016 2015, 2018–2019 2015, 2018–2019; 2017–2022 **2023–present**

Bold type indicates current selectors
Notes: *—it is not immediately clear if these games were only scheduled between the two competing teams and base their authority on general acclamation, or if any or all of these games had an independent third party formally sponsor it to increase legitimacy; **—National Sports News Service rankings were merged into the Fox FAB 50 rankings, beginning in 2000; †—USA High School Football rankings were split into public and private school divisions, beginning in 2013; ‡—American Football Monthly rankings were split into public and private school divisions, beginning in 2005

== National champions by year ==
=== Composite ===
Year	Champion(s)	Record(s)	Coach(es)	Selector(s)	Note(s)
1897	Madison (WI)	8–0		NCG	
1898	(no champion)				
1899	(no champion)				
1900	Moline (IL)			SL	
1901	(no champion)				
1902	Chicago (IL) Hyde Park	5–0	Walter Eckersall	NCG, SL, TH	Eckersall served as player-coach
1903	Chicago (IL) North Division	7–0–1	Charlie Daly	NCG, SL, TH	Now called Lincoln Park High
1903	Chicago (IL) North Division	7–0–1	Al Johnson	NCG, SL, TH	Now called Lincoln Park High
1904	Detroit (MI) Central			NCG, NSNS, TH	not listed in older sources as NSNS champion*
1905	(no champion)				
1906	Seattle (WA) Broadway			NCG, SL, TH	
1907	(no champion)				
1908	Longmont (CO) Longmont High School			Los Angeles Herald, Volume 36, Number 86, 26 December 1908, c	
1909	Chicago (IL) Englewood			SL, TH	
1910	Oak Park (IL)	10–2	Robert Zuppke	NCG, NSNS	
1911	Oak Park (IL)	10–0	Robert Zuppke	NCG, NSNS	
1912	Oak Park (IL)	10–0	Robert Zuppke	NCG, NSNS	
1912	Fostoria (OH)	8–0	Lawrence Boles	BET, NCG	
1913	Oak Park (IL)	10–1	Glenn Thistlewaite	NCG, NSNS	
1914	Everett (MA)	13–0	Cleo O'Donnell	NCG, NSNS	
1915	Detroit (MI) Central	11–0–1	Edbert C. Buss	NCG, NSNS	
1915	Everett (MA)	11–0–1	Cleo O'Donnell	NCG, NSNS	
1916	San Diego (CA)	12–0	Nibs Price	NSNS	
1916	Toledo (OH) Scott		Tommy Merrell	NCG, SL, TH	
1917	Everett (WA)	12–0	Enoch Bagshaw	HSSH	
1918	Harrisburg Tech (PA)	9–0	Paul Smith	NSNS	
1919	Harrisburg Tech (PA)	12–0	Paul Smith	NCG, NSNS	
1919	Everett (WA)		Enoch Bagshaw	NCG, TH	
1919	Toledo (OH) Scott		Pat Dwyer	NCG, TH	
1920	Everett (WA)	9–0–1	Enoch Bagshaw	NCG, NSNS	
1920	Oak Park (IL)	9–0–1	Glenn Thistlewaite	NCG, NSNS	
1921	Jacksonville (FL) Duval	8–0	Wiley Wright	NSNS	
1922	Toledo (OH) Scott	9–0	William Neill	NCG, NSNS	
1923	Toledo (OH) Scott	10–0	William Neill	NCG, NSNS	
1923	East Cleveland (OH) Shaw	9–1	John Snavely	NCG, NSNS	
1924	Toledo (OH) Waite	10–0	Joe Collins	NCG, NSNS	
1924	Cedar Rapids (IA) Washington		Leo Novak	SL	
1925	Pine Bluff (AR)	16–0	Foy Hammons	NCG, NSNS	
1925	Louisville (KY) duPont Manual		Neal Arntson	NCG	
1926	Tuscaloosa (AL)	9–0	Paul Burnum	NCG, NSNS	
1927	Waco (TX)	14–0	Paul Tyson	NCG, NSNS	
1928	Medford (OR)	9–0	Prink Callison	NSNS	
1929	Tuscaloosa (AL)	9–0	Paul Burnum	NCG, NSNS	
1930	Phoenix Union (AZ)	13–0	Robby Robinson	NSNS	
1931	Ashland (KY)	10–0	Paul Jenkins	NSNS	
1932	Toledo (OH) Waite	12–0	Don McCallister	NCG, NSNS	
1932	New Rochelle (NY)	9–0	Bill McKenna	NHSFC	
1933	Oklahoma City (OK) Capitol Hill	12–0	Jim Lookabaugh	NCG, NSNS	
1934	Canton (OH) McKinley	11–0	Jim Aiken	NSNS	
1935	Massillon (OH) Washington	10–0	Paul Brown	NSNS	
1936	Massillon (OH) Washington	10–0	Paul Brown	NSNS	
1937	Chicago (IL) Austin	10–0	William Heiland	NSNS	
1937	Evansville (IN) Memorial		Don Ping	NCG, SL, TH	
1938	Louisville (KY) duPont Manual	10–0	Ray Baer	LSANHSC, NSNS	
1939	Garfield (NJ)	10–0	Art Argauer	NSCHB	
1939	Massillon (OH) Washington	10–0	Paul Brown	NSNS	
1939	Pine Bluff (AR)	11–0–1	Allen Dunaway	LSANHSC	
1940	Massillon (OH) Washington	10–0	Paul Brown	NSNS	
1941	Chicago (IL) Leo	11–0	Whitey Cronin	NSNS	
1942	Miami (FL)	9–0	Lyles Alley	NSNS	
1943	Miami (FL)	9–0	Tom Moore	NSNS	
1944	Chattanooga (TN) Baylor	10–0	Thomas H. Williams	HSSH	
1945	Donora (PA)	10–0	Jimmy Russell	HSSH	
1946	Little Rock Central (AR)	14–0	Raymond Burnett	NSNS	
1947	East Chicago (IN) Roosevelt	9–0	Pete Rucinski	NSNS	
1947	Lynn Classical (MA)	11–1	Bill Joyce	NSNS	
1948	Waco (TX)	14–0	Carl Price	NSNS	
1949	Wichita Falls (TX)	14–0	Joe Golding	NSNS	
1950	Massillon (OH) Washington	10–0	Chuck Mather	NSNS	
1951	Weymouth (MA)	9–0	Harry Arlanson	NSNS	
1952	Massillon (OH) Washington	10–0	Chuck Mather	NSNS	
1953	Massillon (OH) Washington	10–0	Chuck Mather	NSNS	
1954	Vallejo (CA)	9–0	Bob Patterson	NSNS	
1955	San Diego (CA)	12–0	Duane Maley	NSNS	
1956	Abilene (TX)	14–0	Chuck Moser	HSSH, NSNS	
1957	Little Rock Central (AR)	12–0	Wilson Matthews	HSSH, NSNS	not listed in older sources as NSNS champion*
1957	Portland (OR) Jefferson	11–0	Thomas DeSylvia	NSNS	not listed in older sources as NSNS champion*
1957	Downey (CA)			NSNS	not listed in recent sources as NSNS champion*
1958	Portland (OR) Jefferson	12–0	Thomas DeSylvia	NSNS	not listed in older sources as NSNS champion*
1958	Oak Ridge (TN)	10–0	Jack Armstrong	HSSH, NSNS	not listed in recent sources as NSNS champion*
1958	Wichita Falls (TX)			NSNS	not listed in recent sources as NSNS champion*
1959	Massillon (OH) Washington	10–0	Leo Strang	NSNS	
1960	Lawrence (KS)	9–0	Al Woolard	NSNS	not listed in older sources as NSNS champion*
1960	Miami (FL)	8–0–1	Ottis Mooney	NSNS	not listed in recent sources as NSNS champion*
1961	Massillon (OH) Washington	11–0	Leo Strang	NSNS	
1962	Valdosta (GA)	12–0	Wright Bazemore	NSNS	
1962	Miami (FL)	9–0	Ottis Mooney	ISS	
1962	San Francisco (CA) St. Ignatius Prep			ISS	
1963	Chicago (IL) St. Rita	9–0	Edward Buckley	NSNS	
1964	Coral Gables (FL)	12–0	Nick Kotys	NSNS	
1965	Miami (FL)	12–0	Robert Carlton	NSNS	
1966	Pico Rivera (CA) El Rancho	13–0	Ernest Johnson	NSNS	
1967	Austin (TX) Reagan	14–0	Travis Raven	NSNS	
1967	Coral Gables (FL)	13–0	Nick Kotys	NSNS	
1968	Austin (TX) Reagan	15–0	Travis Raven	NSNS	
1968	Coral Gables (FL)	12–1	Nick Kotys	NSNS	not listed in recent sources as NSNS champion*
1969	Bogalusa (LA)	14–0	Lewis Murray	NSNS	not listed in recent sources as NSNS champion*
1969	Pasadena (CA) Blair	13–0	Pete Yoder	NSNS	not listed in older sources as NSNS champion*
1969	Coral Gables (FL)	10–0	Nick Kotys	NSNS	not listed in recent sources as NSNS champion*
1969	Valdosta (GA)	12–0–1	Wright Bazemore	NSNS	not listed in recent sources as NSNS champion*
1970	Austin (TX) Reagan	14–1	Travis Raven	NSNS	
1971	Valdosta (GA)	13–0	Wright Bazemore	NSNS	
1972	Odessa (TX) Permian	14–0	Gil Bartosh	NSNS	not listed in older sources as NSNS champion*
1972	Bristol Tennessee	13–0	John Cropp	NSNS	
1973	Tyler (TX) John Tyler	15–0	Corky Nelson	NSNS	not listed in older sources as NSNS champion*
1973	Chattanooga (TN) Baylor	13–0	Red Etter	NSNS	
1974	Thomasville (GA)	12–1	Jim Hughes	NSNS	
1975	Los Angeles (CA) Loyola	13–0	Marty Shaughnessy	NSNS, SL	
1975	Rancho Cordova (CA) Cordova	12–0	Dewey Guerra	NSNS	not listed in older sources as NSNS champion*
1976	Warner Robins (GA)	13–0	Robert Davis	NSNS, SL	not listed in older sources as NSNS champion*
1976	Cincinnati (OH) Moeller	12–0	Gerry Faust	AJS33, NPSN, NSNS	
1977	Cincinnati (OH) Moeller	12–0	Gerry Faust	NPSN, NSNS	
1978	Annandale (VA)	14–0	Bob Hardage	NSNS	
1979	Cincinnati (OH) Moeller	12–0	Gerry Faust	NSNS	
1980	Cincinnati (OH) Moeller	13–0	Gerry Faust	NSNS	
1981	Warner Robins (GA)	15–0	Robert Davis	NSNS	
1982	Cincinnati (OH) Moeller	13–0	Steve Klonne	NSNS, USATS25	
1983	Berwick Area (PA)	13–0	George Curry	NSNS, USATS25	
1984	Valdosta (GA)	15–0	Nick Hyder	NSNS, USATS25	
1985	East St. Louis (IL)	14–0	Bob Shannon	NSNS, USATS25	
1986	Valdosta (GA)	15–0	Nick Hyder	NSNS, USATS25	
1987	Plano (TX)	16–0	Gerald Brence	NSNS	
1987	Fontana (CA)	14–0	Dick Bruich	WFSNPP	
1987	Pittsburgh (PA) North Hills	13–0	Jack McCurry	USATS25	
1988	Pensacola (FL) Pine Forest	14–0	Carl Madison	NSNS, USATS25	
1988	Prichard (AL) Vigor	13–0	Harold Clark	WFSNPP	
1989	Odessa (TX) Permian	16–0	Gary Gaines	NSNS, WFSNPP	
1989	Cleveland (OH) St. Ignatius	13–0	Chuck Kyle	USATS25	
1990	Houston (TX) Aldine	15–0	Bill Smith	WFSNPP	
1990	Lawton (OK) Eisenhower	14–0	Tim Reynolds	USATS25	
1990	Ruston (LA)	14–0	Jimmy Childress	NSNS	
1991	LaGrange (GA)	15–0	Gary Guthrie	USATS25	
1991	Indianapolis (IN) Ben Davis	14–0	Dick Dullaghan	NSNS, WFSNPP	
1992	Berwick Area (PA)	15–0	George Curry	USATS25	
1992	Valdosta (GA)	14–0	Nick Hyder	NSNS, WFSNPP	
1993	Cleveland (OH) St. Ignatius	14–0	Chuck Kyle	NSNS, USATS25, WFSNPP	
1994	Santa Ana (CA) Mater Dei	14–0	Bruce Rollinson	USATS25	
1994	Concord (CA) De La Salle	13–0	Bob Ladouceur	NSNS, WFSNPP	
1995	Berwick Area (PA)	15–0	George Curry	USAHSF, USATS25	
1995	Cleveland (OH) St. Ignatius	14–0	Chuck Kyle	NSNS, WFSNPP	
1996	Hampton (VA)	14–0	Mike Smith	NSNS, USAHSF, WFSNPP	
1996	Santa Ana (CA) Mater Dei	14–0	Bruce Rollinson	USATS25	
1997	Doylestown (PA) Central Bucks West	15–0	Mike Pettine Sr.	USAHSF	
1997	Canton (OH) McKinley	14–0	Thom McDaniels	USATS25	
1997	Hampton (VA)	13–0	Mike Smith	NSNS, WFSNPP	
1998	West Monroe (LA)	15–0		DBFN, TBNHSFP	
1998	Concord (CA) De La Salle	12–0	Bob Ladouceur	NSNS, USAHSF, USATS25, WFSNPP	
1999	Midland (TX) Lee	15–0	John Parchman	DBFN, USATS25	
1999	Shreveport (LA) Evangel Christian	15–0	Dennis Dunn	AFM, FF50, TBNHSFP, USAHSF, WFSNPP	
1999	Concord (CA) De La Salle	12–0	Bob Ladouceur	NSNS	
2000	West Monroe (LA)	15–0		TBNHSFP	
2000	Erie (PA) Cathedral Prep	14–0		USAHSF	
2000	Long Beach Poly (CA)	14–0		DBFN	
2000	Concord (CA) De La Salle	13–0	Bob Ladouceur	AFM, FF50, NSNS, USATS25, WFSNPP	
2001	Jenks (OK) Jenks	13–0		USAHSF	
2001	Concord (CA) De La Salle	12–0	Bob Ladouceur	AFM, DBFN, SSF50, TBNHSFP, USATS25, WFSNPP	
2002	Lilburn (GA) Parkview	15–0		USAHSF	
2002	Concord (CA) De La Salle	13–0	Bob Ladouceur	AFM, SSF50, TBNHSFP, USATS25, WFSNPP	
2003	Concord (CA) De La Salle	13–0	Bob Ladouceur	AFM, SSF50, TBNHSFP, USAHSF, USATS25, WFSNPP	
2003	Thousand Oaks (CA) Westlake			CP	
2004	Southlake (TX) Carroll	16–0	Todd Dodge	AFM, SSF50, TBNHSFP, USATS25, WFSNPP	
2004	Charlotte (NC) Independence	15–0	Bill Geiler	USAHSF	
2004	Cincinnati (OH) Colerain	15–0	Kerry Coombs	CP, CPFCR	
2005	Southlake (TX) Carroll	16–0	Todd Dodge	AFMPuS, CP, CPFCR, MPX25, TBNHSFP, WFSNPP	Both overall and public school champion
2005	Cincinnati (OH) St. Xavier	15–0		AFMPrS, USAHSF	Both overall and private school champion
2005	Lakeland (FL)	15–0	Bill Castle	SSF50, USATS25	
2006	Southlake (TX) Carroll	16–0	Todd Dodge	CP, CPFCR, MPX25, TBNHSFP, USAHSF, USATS25	
2006	Lakeland (FL)	15–0	Bill Castle	RF50, WFSNPP	
2007	Cincinnati (OH) St. Xavier	15–0	Steve Specht	CP, CPFCR, ESPNRF50, WFSNPP	
2007	Miami Northwestern (FL)	15–0	Billy Rolle	ESPNHE25, USATS25	
2007	Concord (CA) De La Salle	13–0	Bob Ladouceur	MPX25, USAHSF	
2008	Fort Lauderdale (FL) St. Thomas Aquinas	15–0	George Smith	CPFCR, ESPNRF50, MPX25, RH100, USAHSF, USATS25, WFSNPP	
2008	Cleveland (OH) St. Ignatius			CP	
2009	Ramsey (NJ) Don Bosco Prep	12–0	Greg Toal	CPFCR, ESPNRF50, MPX25, RH100, USAHSF, USATS25, WFSNPP	
2009	Abilene (TX)			CP	
2010	Batesville (MS) South Panola	15–0	Lance Pogue	MPX25, RH100, USATS25	
2010	Fort Lauderdale (FL) St. Thomas Aquinas	15–0	George Smith	ESPNRF50, WFSNPP	
2010	Lakewood (OH) St. Edward	15–0		CP, USAHSF	
2010	Concord (CA) De La Salle	14–0	Bob Ladouceur	CPFCR	
2010	Ramsey (NJ) Don Bosco Prep	12–0		MR	
2011	Calhoun (GA)	15–0		MPSS	Small school champion only
2011	Louisville (KY) Trinity	14–0		RH100, SI	
2011	Ramsey (NJ) Don Bosco Prep	11–0	Greg Toal	CP, ESPNHSF50, MR, MPX25, USAHSF, USATS25, WFSNPP	
2012	Katy (TX)	16–0	Gary Joseph	F50	
2012	Concord (CA) De La Salle	15–0	Bob Ladouceur	BSMGT25, PF50	
2012	Bellevue (WA)	14–0		MPMS, SI	Both overall and medium school champion
2012	River Ridge (LA) John Curtis Christian	14–0	John T. Curtis Jr.	HSFAT25, MPX25, PF, RH100, USAHSF, USATS25, WFSNPP	
2012	Allen (TX)	15–1		CP, HSFAT25, MR	
2012	Davie (FL) University		Roger Harriott	MPSS	Small school champion only
2013	Allen (TX)	16–0	Tom Westerberg	BSMGT25, HSFAT25	
2013	Bellflower (CA) St. John Bosco	15–0	Jason Negro	CP, MR, USAHSFPrS	Both overall and private school champion
2013	Maria Stein (OH) Marion Local	15–0		MPSS	Small school champion only
2013	Miami (FL) Booker T. Washington	14–0	Ice Harris	F50, MPMS, MPX25, PF, USATS25, WFSNPP	Both overall and medium school champion
2013	Hoover (AL)		Josh Niblet	USAHSFPuS	Public school champion only
2014	Allen (TX)	16–0	Tom Westerberg	BSME25, HSFAT25, MPX25, NSNS	
2014	Las Vegas (NV) Bishop Gorman	15–0	Tony Sanchez	USATS25, WFSNPP	
2014	Concord (CA) De La Salle	14–0	Justin Alumbaugh	CP, MR	
2014	Jacksonville (FL) Trinity Christian			MPSS	Small school champion only
2015	Katy (TX)	16–0	Gary Joseph	MR, MPX25, PNNPP	
2015	Las Vegas (NV) Bishop Gorman	15–0	Kenny Sanchez	BSME25, USATS25	
2015	Moultrie (GA) Colquitt County	15–0	Rush Propst	HSFANT50, PF	
2015	Jacksonville (FL) Trinity Christian	14–0		HSFASST25, MPSS	Small school champion only
2015	Sammamish (WA) Eastside Catholic	13–0		HSFAMST25	Medium school champion only
2015	Concord (CA) De La Salle			CP	
2016	Las Vegas (NV) Bishop Gorman	15–0	Kenny Sanchez	BSME25, CP, HSFANT50, MR, MPX25, PF, PNNPP, USATS25	
2016	Munhall (PA) Steel Valley	15–0		MPSS	Small school champion only
2017	Santa Ana (CA) Mater Dei	15–0	Bruce Rollinson	BSME25, CP, HSFANT100, MR, MPX25, PNNPP, USATS25	
2018	Catawissa (PA) Southern Columbia Area	16–0		HSFASST25	Small school champion only
2018	Houston (TX) North Shore	16–0	Jon Kay	MPX25, MR, PF, PNNPP	
2018	Alcoa (TN)	15–0	Gary Rankin	HSFAMST25	Medium school champion only
2018	Santa Ana (CA) Mater Dei	13–2	Bruce Rollinson	BSME25, CP, HSFANT100, PF, USATS25	
2018	Hollywood (FL) Chaminade–Madonna Prep	12–2		MPSS	Small school champion only
2019	Catawissa (PA) Southern Columbia Area	16–0		HSFASST25	Small school champion only
2019	Bellflower (CA) St. John Bosco	13–1	Jason Negro	BSME25, CP, HSFANT100, MPX25, MR, PF, PNNPP, USATS25	
2019	Cedar Hill (TX) Trinity Christian	13–1		MPSS	Small school champion only
2019	Miami Northwestern (FL)	13–2		HSFAMST25	Medium school champion only
2020	Austin (TX) Westlake	14–0	Todd Dodge	BSME25	
2020	Catawissa (PA) Southern Columbia Area	12–0	Jim Roth	MPSS	Small school champion only
2020	Bradenton (FL) IMG Academy	8–0	Bobby Acosta	HSFANT100, MPX25, SBLP25, USATS25	
2020	Santa Ana (CA) Mater Dei	5–0	Bruce Rollinson	CP, MR	
2021	China Spring (TX)	16–0	Brain Bell	MPSS	Small school champion only
2021	Santa Ana (CA) Mater Dei	12–0	Bruce Rollinson	BSME25, CP, HSFANT100, MPX25, MR, SBLP25, USATS25	
2022	Carthage (TX)	16–0	Scott Surratt	MPSS	Small school champion only
2022	Bellflower (CA) St. John Bosco	13–1	Jason Negro	BSME25, CP, HSFANT100, MPX25, MR, SBLP25, USATS25	
2023	Santa Ana (CA) Mater Dei	13-1	Frank McManus	BSME25, CP, HSFANT300, SBLP25	
2023	DeSoto (TX)	15-0	Claude Mathis	MR	
2023	Las Vegas (NV) Bishop Gorman	15–0	Brent Browner	MPX25, USATS25	
2023	Malakoff (TX)	16-0	Jamie Driskell	MPSS	Small school champion only
2024	Santa Ana (CA) Mater Dei	13-0	Raul Lara	BSME25, CP, HSFANT300, MPX25, MR, SBLP25, USATS25	
2024	Carthage (TX)	15-1	Scott Surratt	MPSS	Small school champion only
2025	Fort Lauderdale (FL) St. Thomas Aquinas	14-1	Roger Harriott	HSFANT300	
2025	Buford (GA)	15-0	Bryant Appling	BSME25, HSR, MPX25, SBLP25, USATS25	
2025	Bixby (OK)	13-0	Loren Montgomery	MR	
2025	Sonora (CA)	15-0	Kirk Clifton	MPSS	Small school champion only

Note: all information between 1904 and 2000 is derived from the National High School Football Record Book (2001), unless otherwise specified; *—listings from an earlier source do not necessarily match listings from a more recent source—it is not immediately clear if this was due to poor record-keeping or if past champions were later reevaluated by the National Sports News Service and revised accordingly.

=== Most selectors ===
No definitive ranking service exists to declare a universal national champion for high school football. Since 2000, five teams have received a consensus 100% of selectors: Las Vegas (NV) Bishop Gorman (2016), Santa Ana (CA) Mater Dei (2017, 2021, 2024) and Bellflower (CA) St. John Bosco (2019, 2022).

Since 1982, four schools have received the most selectors in consecutive seasons: Concord (CA) De La Salle (2000–2003), Santa Ana (CA) Mater Dei (2017–2018, 2023–2024), Southlake (TX) Carroll (2004–2006) and Hampton (VA) (1996–1997).

Schools Receiving the Most Selectors (excluding selectors from Small, Medium, Public/Private and other specialty polls)
Year	School	Selectors received	Selectors total	% of Selectors received
1982	Cincinnati (OH) Moeller	2	2	100%
1983	Berwick Area (PA)	2	2	100%
1984	Valdosta (GA)	2	2	100%
1985	East St. Louis (IL)	2	2	100%
1986	Valdosta (GA)	2	2	100%
1987	(no plurality received)			
1988	Pensacola (FL) Pine Forest	2	3	67%
1989	Odessa (TX) Permian	2	3	67%
1990	(no plurality received)			
1991	Indianapolis (IN) Ben Davis	2	3	67%
1992	Valdosta (GA)	2	3	67%
1993	Cleveland (OH) St. Ignatius	3	3	100%
1994	Concord (CA) De La Salle	2	3	67%
1995	(no plurality received)			
1996	Hampton (VA)	3	4	75%
1997	Hampton (VA)	2	4	50%
1998	Concord (CA) De La Salle	4	6	67%
1999	Shreveport (LA) Evangel Christian	5	8	63%
2000	Concord (CA) De La Salle	5	8	63%
2001	Concord (CA) De La Salle	6	7	86%
2002	Concord (CA) De La Salle	5	6	83%
2003	Concord (CA) De La Salle	6	7	86%
2004	Southlake (TX) Carroll	5	8	63%
2005	Southlake (TX) Carroll	5	8	63%
2006	Southlake (TX) Carroll	6	8	75%
2007	Cincinnati (OH) St. Xavier	4	8	50%
2008	Fort Lauderdale (FL) St. Thomas Aquinas	7	8	88%
2009	Ramsey (NJ) Don Bosco Prep	7	8	88%
2010	Batesville (MS) South Panola	3	9	33%
2011	Ramsey (NJ) Don Bosco Prep	7	9	78%
2012	River Ridge (LA) John Curtis Christian	7	14	50%
2013	Miami (FL) Booker T. Washington	5	9	56%
2014	Allen (TX)	4	8	50%
2015	Katy (TX)	3	8	38%
2016	Las Vegas (NV) Bishop Gorman	8	8	100%
2017	Santa Ana (CA) Mater Dei	7	7	100%
2018	Santa Ana (CA) Mater Dei	5	9	56%
2019	Bellflower (CA) St. John Bosco	8	8	100%
2020	Bradenton (FL) IMG Academy	4	7	57%
2021	Santa Ana (CA) Mater Dei	7	7	100%
2022	Bellflower (CA) St. John Bosco	7	7	100%
2023	Santa Ana (CA) Mater Dei	4	7	57%
2024	Santa Ana (CA) Mater Dei	7	7	100%
2025	Buford (GA)	5	7	71%

=== By current selector ===
Year	USA Today	hsratings.com	MaxPreps	Massey Ratings	High School Football America	BlueStar Media	SBLive
1982	Cincinnati (OH) Moeller						
1983	Berwick (PA) Area						
1984	Valdosta (GA)						
1985	East St. Louis (IL)						
1986	Valdosta (GA)						
1987	Pittsburgh (PA) North Hills						
1988	Pensacola (FL) Pine Forest						
1989	Cleveland (OH) St. Ignatius						
1990	Lawton (OK) Eisenhower						
1991	LaGrange (GA)						
1992	Berwick (PA) Area						
1993	Cleveland (OH) St. Ignatius						
1994	Santa Ana (CA) Mater Dei						
1995	Berwick (PA) Area						
1996	Santa Ana (CA) Mater Dei						
1997	Canton (OH) McKinley						
1998	Concord (CA) De La Salle						
1999	Midland (TX) Lee						
2000	Concord (CA) De La Salle						
2001	Concord (CA) De La Salle						
2002	Concord (CA) De La Salle						
2003	Concord (CA) De La Salle	Thousand Oaks (CA) Westlake					
2004	Southlake (TX) Carroll	Cincinnati (OH) Colerain					
2005	Lakeland (FL)	Southlake (TX) Carroll	Southlake (TX) Carroll				
2006	Southlake (TX) Carroll	Southlake (TX) Carroll	Southlake (TX) Carroll				
2007	Miami (FL) Northwestern	Cincinnati (OH) St. Xavier	Cincinnati (OH) St. Xavier				
2008	Fort Lauderdale (FL) St. Thomas Aquinas	Cleveland (OH) St. Ignatius	Fort Lauderdale (FL) St. Thomas Aquinas				
2009	Ramsey (NJ) Don Bosco Prep	Abilene (TX)	Ramsey (NJ) Don Bosco Prep				
2010	Batesville (MS) South Panola	Lakewood (OH) St. Edward	Batesville (MS) South Panola	Ramsey (NJ) Don Bosco Prep			
2011	Ramsey (NJ) Don Bosco Prep	Ramsey (NJ) Don Bosco Prep	Ramsey (NJ) Don Bosco Prep	Ramsey (NJ) Don Bosco Prep			
2012	River Ridge (LA) John Curtis Christian	Allen (TX)	River Ridge (LA) John Curtis Christian	Allen (TX)	River Ridge (LA) John Curtis Christian	Concord (CA) De La Salle	
2013	Miami (FL) Booker T. Washington	Bellflower (CA) St. John Bosco	Miami (FL) Booker T. Washington	Bellflower (CA) St. John Bosco	Allen (TX)	Allen (TX)	
2014	Las Vegas (NV) Bishop Gorman	Concord (CA) De La Salle	Allen (TX)	Concord (CA) De La Salle	Allen (TX)	Allen (TX)	
2015	Las Vegas (NV) Bishop Gorman	Concord (CA) De La Salle	Katy (TX)	Katy (TX)	Moultrie (GA) Colquitt County	Las Vegas (NV) Bishop Gorman	
2016	Las Vegas (NV) Bishop Gorman	Las Vegas (NV) Bishop Gorman	Las Vegas (NV) Bishop Gorman	Las Vegas (NV) Bishop Gorman	Las Vegas (NV) Bishop Gorman	Las Vegas (NV) Bishop Gorman	
2017	Santa Ana (CA) Mater Dei	Santa Ana (CA) Mater Dei	Santa Ana (CA) Mater Dei	Santa Ana (CA) Mater Dei	Santa Ana (CA) Mater Dei	Santa Ana (CA) Mater Dei	
2018	Santa Ana (CA) Mater Dei	Santa Ana (CA) Mater Dei	Houston (TX) North Shore	Houston (TX) North Shore	Santa Ana (CA) Mater Dei	Santa Ana (CA) Mater Dei	
2019	Bellflower (CA) St. John Bosco	Bellflower (CA) St. John Bosco	Bellflower (CA) St. John Bosco	Bellflower (CA) St. John Bosco	Bellflower (CA) St. John Bosco	Bellflower (CA) St. John Bosco	
2020	Bradenton (FL) IMG Academy	Santa Ana (CA) Mater Dei	Bradenton (FL) IMG Academy	Santa Ana (CA) Mater Dei	Bradenton (FL) IMG Academy	Austin (TX) Westlake	Bradenton (FL) IMG Academy
2021	Santa Ana (CA) Mater Dei	Santa Ana (CA) Mater Dei	Santa Ana (CA) Mater Dei	Santa Ana (CA) Mater Dei	Santa Ana (CA) Mater Dei	Santa Ana (CA) Mater Dei	Santa Ana (CA) Mater Dei
2022	Bellflower (CA) St. John Bosco	Bellflower (CA) St. John Bosco	Bellflower (CA) St. John Bosco	Bellflower (CA) St. John Bosco	Bellflower (CA) St. John Bosco	Bellflower (CA) St. John Bosco	Bellflower (CA) St. John Bosco
2023	Las Vegas (NV) Bishop Gorman	Santa Ana (CA) Mater Dei	Las Vegas (NV) Bishop Gorman	DeSoto (TX)	Santa Ana (CA) Mater Dei	Santa Ana (CA) Mater Dei	Santa Ana (CA) Mater Dei
2024	Santa Ana (CA) Mater Dei	Santa Ana (CA) Mater Dei	Santa Ana (CA) Mater Dei	Santa Ana (CA) Mater Dei	Santa Ana (CA) Mater Dei	Santa Ana (CA) Mater Dei	Santa Ana (CA) Mater Dei
2025	Buford (GA)	Buford (GA)	Buford (GA)	Bixby (OK)	Fort Lauderdale (FL) St. Thomas Aquinas	Buford (GA)	Buford (GA)

== National championships by school ==
=== Composite ===
Years selected for overall national championships are denoted by boldfaced type below; years selected for specialty national championships that were reserved for specific kinds of schools (such as for private, public, medium or small-sized schools only) are in regular type. It is theoretically possible that some early national championship games held when segregation was legal may have restricted qualifying schools to all-white rosters, but in the absence of incriminating documentation, all championship games are currently assumed to have been open to all teams and are therefore listed below in boldface.

City	State	School	Championship(s)	Year(s)
Concord	CA	De La Salle	12	**1994**, **1998**, **1999**, **2000**, **2001**, **2002**, **2003**, **2007**, **2010**, **2012**, **2014**, **2015**
Massillon	OH	Washington	9	**1935**, **1936**, **1939**, **1940**, **1950**, **1952**, **1953**, **1959**, **1961**
Santa Ana	CA	Mater Dei	8	**1994**, **1996**, **2017**, **2018**, **2020**, **2021, 2023, 2024**
Valdosta	GA	Valdosta	6	**1962**, **1969**, **1971**, **1984**, **1986**, **1992**
Miami	FL	Miami	5	**1942**, **1943**, **1960**, **1962**, **1965**
Cincinnati	OH	Moeller	5	**1976**, **1977**, **1979**, **1980**, **1982**
Oak Park	IL	Oak Park	5	**1910**, **1911**, **1912**, **1913**, **1920**
Cleveland	OH	St. Ignatius	4	**1989**, **1993**, **1995**, **2008**
Coral Gables	FL	Coral Gables	4	**1964**, **1967**, **1968**, **1969**
Las Vegas	NV	Bishop Gorman	4	**2014**, **2015**, **2016, 2023**
Toledo	OH	Scott	4	**1916**, **1919**, **1922**, **1923**
Allen	TX	Allen	3	**2012**, **2013**, **2014**
Austin	TX	Reagan	3	**1967**, **1968**, **1970**
Bellflower	CA	St. John Bosco	3	**2013**, **2019**, **2022**
Berwick	PA	Berwick Area	3	**1983**, **1992**, **1995**
Catawissa	PA	Southern Columbia Area	3	2018, 2019, 2020
Everett	WA	Everett	3	**1917**, **1919**, **1920**
Fort Lauderdale	FL	St. Thomas Aquinas	3	**2008**, **2010, 2025**
Ramsey	NJ	Don Bosco Prep	3	**2009**, **2010**, **2011**
Southlake	TX	Carroll	3	**2004**, **2005**, **2006**
Abilene	TX	Abilene	2	**1956**, **2009**
Canton	OH	McKinley	2	**1934**, **1997**
Carthage	TX	Carthage	2	2022, 2024
Chattanooga	TN	Baylor	2	**1944**, **1973**
Chicago	IL	Englewood	2	**1908**, **1909**
Cincinnati	OH	St. Xavier	2	**2005**, **2007**
Detroit	MI	Central	2	**1904**, **1915**
Everett	MA	Everett	2	**1914**, **1915**
Hampton	VA	Hampton	2	**1996**, **1997**
Harrisburg	PA	Harrisburg Tech	2	**1918**, **1919**
Jacksonville	FL	Trinity Christian	2	2014, 2015
Katy	TX	Katy	2	**2012**, **2015**
Lakeland	FL	Lakeland	2	**2005**, **2006**
Little Rock	AR	Little Rock Central	2	**1946**, **1957**
Louisville	KY	duPont Manual	2	**1925**, **1938**
Miami	FL	Miami Northwestern	2	**2007**, 2019
Odessa	TX	Permian	2	**1972**, **1989**
Pine Bluff	AR	Pine Bluff	2	**1925**, **1939**
Portland	OR	Jefferson	2	**1957**, **1958**
San Diego	CA	San Diego	2	**1916**, **1955**
Toledo	OH	Waite	2	**1924**, **1932**
Tuscaloosa	AL	Tuscaloosa	2	**1926**, **1929**
Waco	TX	Waco	2	**1927**, **1948**
Warner Robins	GA	Warner Robins	2	**1976**, **1981**
West Monroe	LA	West Monroe	2	**1998**, **2000**
Wichita Falls	TX	Wichita Falls	2	**1949**, **1958**
Alcoa	TN	Alcoa	1	2018
Annandale	VA	Annandale	1	**1978**
Ashland	KY	Ashland	1	**1931**
Austin	TX	Westlake	1	**2020**
Batesville	MS	South Panola	1	**2010**
Bellevue	WA	Bellevue	1	**2012**
Bixby	OK	Bixby	1	**2025**
Bogalusa	LA	Bogalusa	1	**1969**
Bradenton	FL	IMG Academy	1	**2020**
Bristol	TN	Tennessee	1	**1972**
Buford	GA	Buford	1	**2025**
Calhoun	GA	Calhoun	1	2011
Cedar Hill	TX	Trinity Christian	1	2019
Cedar Rapids	IA	Washington	1	**1924**
Charlotte	NC	Independence	1	**2004**
Chicago	IL	Austin	1	**1937**
Chicago	IL	Hyde Park	1	**1902**
Chicago	IL	Leo	1	**1941**
Chicago	IL	North Division (now called Lincoln Park High)	1	**1903**
Chicago	IL	St. Rita	1	**1963**
China Spring	TX	China Spring	1	2021
Cincinnati	OH	Colerain	1	**2004**
Davie	FL	University	1	2012
DeSoto	TX	DeSoto	1	**2023**
Donora	PA	Donora	1	**1945**
Downey	CA	Downey	1	**1957**
Doylestown	PA	Central Bucks West	1	**1997**
East Chicago	IN	Roosevelt	1	**1947**
East Cleveland	OH	Shaw	1	**1923**
East St. Louis	IL	East St. Louis	1	**1985**
Erie	PA	Cathedral Prep	1	**2000**
Evansville	IN	Memorial	1	**1937**
Fontana	CA	Fontana	1	**1987**
Fostoria	OH	Fostoria	1	**1912**
Hollywood	FL	Chaminade–Madonna Prep	1	2018
Hoover	AL	Hoover	1	2013
Houston	TX	Aldine	1	**1990**
Houston	TX	North Shore	1	**2018**
Houston	TX	Stratford	1	**1978**
Indianapolis	IN	Ben Davis	1	**1991**
Jacksonville	FL	Duval	1	**1921**
Jenks	OK	Jenks	1	**2001**
LaGrange	GA	LaGrange	1	**1991**
Lakewood	OH	St. Edward	1	**2010**
Lawrence	KS	Lawrence	1	**1960**
Lawton	OK	Eisenhower	1	**1990**
Lilburn	GA	Parkview	1	**2002**
Long Beach	CA	Long Beach Poly	1	**2000**
Los Angeles	CA	Loyola	1	**1975**
Louisville	KY	Trinity	1	**2011**
Lynn	MA	Lynn Classical	1	**1947**
Madison	WI	Madison	1	**1897**
Malakoff	TX	Malakoff	1	2023
Maria Stein	OH	Marion Local	1	2013
Medford	OR	Medford	1	**1928**
Miami	FL	Booker T. Washington	1	**2013**
Midland	TX	Lee	1	**1999**
Moline	IL	Moline	1	**1900**
Moultrie	GA	Colquitt County	1	**2015**
Munhall	PA	Steel Valley	1	2016
New Rochelle	NY	New Rochelle	1	**1932**
Oak Ridge	TN	Oak Ridge	1	**1958**
Oklahoma City	OK	Capitol Hill	1	**1933**
Pasadena	CA	Blair	1	**1969**
Pensacola	FL	Pine Forest	1	**1988**
Phoenix	AZ	Union	1	**1930**
Pico Rivera	CA	El Rancho	1	**1966**
Pittsburgh	PA	North Hills	1	**1987**
Plano	TX	Plano	1	**1987**
Prichard	AL	Vigor	1	**1988**
Rancho Cordova	CA	Cordova	1	**1975**
River Ridge	LA	John Curtis Christian	1	**2012**
Ruston	LA	Ruston	1	**1990**
Sammamish	WA	Eastside Catholic	1	2015
San Francisco	CA	St. Ignatius Prep	1	**1962**
Santa Fe Springs	CA	St. Paul	1	**1978**
Seattle	WA	Broadway	1	**1906**
Shreveport	LA	Evangel Christian	1	**1999**
Sonora	CA	Sonora	1	2025
Thomasville	GA	Thomasville	1	**1974**
Thousand Oaks	CA	Westlake	1	**2003**
Tyler	TX	John Tyler	1	**1973**
Vallejo	CA	Vallejo	1	**1954**
Weymouth	MA	Weymouth	1	**1951**

=== Most selectors ===
Schools receiving the most selectors, since 1982 (excluding selectors from small, medium, public/private and other specialty polls)
City	State	School	Championships	Year (% of selectors received)
Concord	CA	De La Salle	6	1994 (67%), 1998 (67%), 2000 (63%), 2001 (86%), 2002 (83%), 2003 (86%)
Santa Ana	CA	Mater Dei	5	2017 (100%), 2018 (56%), 2021 (100%), 2023 (67%), 2024 (100%)
Southlake	TX	Carroll	3	2004 (63%), 2005 (63%), 2006 (75%)
Valdosta	GA	Valdosta	3	1984 (100%), 1986 (100%), 1992 (67%)
Bellflower	CA	St. John Bosco	2	2019 (100%), 2022 (100%)
Hampton	VA	Hampton	2	1996 (75%), 1997 (50%)
Ramsey	NJ	Don Bosco Prep	2	2009 (88%), 2011 (78%)
Allen	TX	Allen	1	2014 (50%)
Batesville	MS	South Panola	1	2010 (33%)
Berwick	PA	Berwick Area	1	1983 (100%)
Bradenton	FL	IMG Academy	1	2020 (57%)
Buford	GA	Buford	1	2025 (71%)
Cincinnati	OH	Moeller	1	1982 (100%)
Cincinnati	OH	St. Xavier	1	2007 (50%)
Cleveland	OH	St. Ignatius	1	1993 (100%)
East St. Louis	IL	East St. Louis	1	1985 (100%)
Fort Lauderdale	FL	St. Thomas Aquinas	1	2008 (88%)
Indianapolis	IN	Ben Davis	1	1991 (67%)
Katy	TX	Katy	1	2015 (38%)
Las Vegas	NV	Bishop Gorman	1	2016 (100%)
Miami	FL	Booker T. Washington	1	2013 (56%)
Odessa	TX	Permian	1	1989 (67%)
Pensacola	FL	Pine Forest	1	1988 (67%)
River Ridge	LA	John Curtis Christian	1	2012 (50%)
Shreveport	LA	Evangel Christian	1	1999 (63%)

== See also ==
- USA Today All-USA high school football team (including Super 25 teams in U.S. and Top 10 teams in East, South, Midwest, and West regions)
- All-American Bowl (high school football)
