= Viking Hall (Bristol, Tennessee) =

Indoor arena in Tennessee, United States

- Interactive map of Viking Hall
- Location: 1100 Edgemont Avenue; Bristol, Tennessee 37620
- Coordinates: 36.5805°N 82.1835°W
- Owner: Bristol Tennessee City Schools
- Capacity: 6,100
- Type: Multi-purpose stadium
- Event: The Classic at Tennessee High School
- Current use: Tennessee High School

Construction
- Opened: 1981
- Builder: City of Bristol

Website
- Viking Athletics facilities

Viking Hall is a 6,100-seat multi-purpose arena in Bristol, Tennessee, United States. Opened in 1981, the facility is the home arena and aquatic center for Tennessee High School in Bristol. It was formerly operated by the City of Bristol but is now managed by Bristol Tennessee City Schools. The facility is now for the exclusive use of Tennessee High School.

Viking Hall was the site of considerable controversy when White Zombie came to perform in the early 1990s and local churches came to protest Rob Zombie's purported "connection to Satan".

In 2010, Highlands Fellowship celebrated their 15th anniversary at Viking Hall on Easter Sunday, breaking all previous attendance records at the Civic Center. The local fire marshall closed the doors after reaching beyond its capacity. He estimated over 8000 people in attendance which included over 2000 outside who could not get in.
