= Gavin Cross =

American baseball player (born 2001)

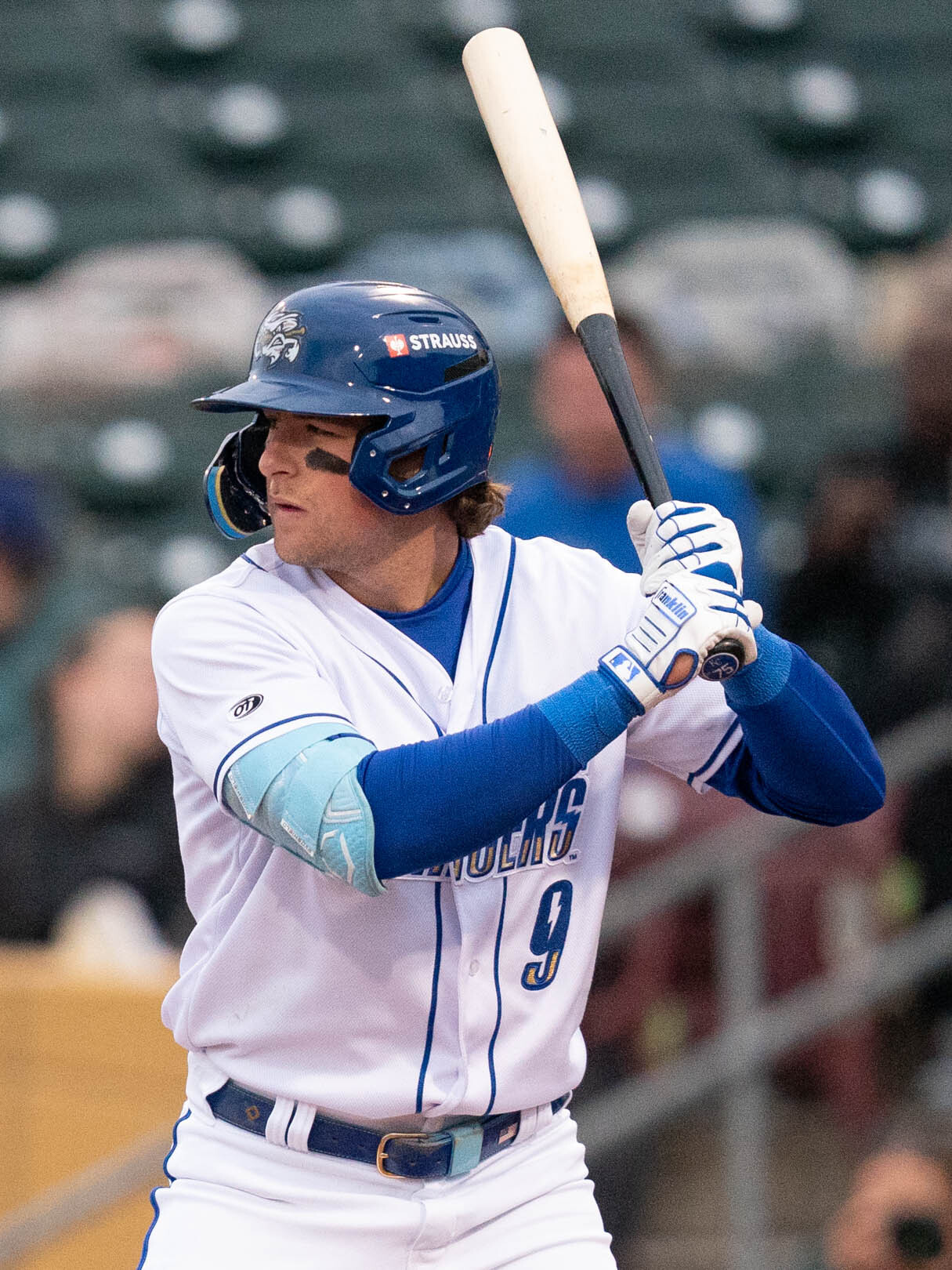
- Cross with the Omaha Storm Chasers in 2026

Kansas City Royals
- Center fielder
- Born: February 13, 2001 (age 25); Bristol, Tennessee, U.S.
- Bats: Left Throws: Left

Gavin James Cross (born February 13, 2001) is an American professional baseball outfielder in the Kansas City Royals organization. He played college baseball for the Virginia Tech Hokies.

== Amateur career ==
Cross attended Tennessee High School in Bristol, Tennessee. As a junior in 2018, he hit 12 home runs alongside stealing forty bases, a Tennessee state record. After graduating in 2019, he enrolled at Virginia Tech to play college baseball for the Virginia Tech Hokies.

As a freshman in 2020, Cross started 16 games in which he batted .369 before the season was cancelled due to the COVID-19 pandemic. He briefly played in the Coastal Plain League with the Peninsula Pilots that summer. In 2021, as a redshirt freshman, he hit for the cycle during a game on April 6 versus East Tennessee State University, going 4 for 6 with seven RBIs and a grand slam. Over 51 starts for the season, Cross slashed .345/.415/.621 with 11 home runs and 35 RBIs. He was named to the All-ACC First-Team, making him the first ever Hokie freshman to earn the honor. After the season's end, he was named to the USA Baseball National Collegiate Team. He batted .431 with four home runs and 14 RBIs with Team USA. He also played in seven games for the Brewster Whitecaps of the Cape Cod Baseball League. Cross entered the 2022 season as a top prospect for the upcoming draft. He appeared in 57 games for the season, slashing .328/.411/.660 with 17 home runs, fifty RBIs, and 12 stolen bases. Following the season's end, he traveled to San Diego where he participated in the Draft Combine.

== Professional career ==
The Kansas City Royals selected Cross in the first round with the ninth overall selection of the 2022 Major League Baseball draft. He signed with the Royals, receiving a $5,202,900 signing bonus, the full slot value for the ninth pick.

Cross made his professional debut with the Rookie-level Arizona Complex League Royals and was promoted to the Columbia Fireflies of the Single-A Carolina League after three games. Over 29 games between both teams, he slashed .312/.437/.633 with eight home runs and 25 RBIs. Cross was assigned to the Quad Cities River Bandits of the High-A Midwest League to open the 2023 season. In early August, he was promoted to the Northwest Arkansas Naturals of the Double-A Texas League. In mid-August, he was placed on the injured list, ending his season. Over 96 games, he batted .203 with 12 home runs, 58 RBIs, and 23 stolen bases. After the season, he was selected to play in the Arizona Fall League for the Surprise Saguaros. Cross was assigned to Northwest Arkansas for the 2024 season. Over 101 games, he batted .261 with 15 home runs, 59 RBIs, and thirty stolen bases and was named the Naturals Player of the Year.

Cross returned to Northwest Arkansas for the 2025 season. Over 114 games, he hit .241 with 17 home runs, 64 RBIs, and 23 stolen bases. Cross was assigned to the Omaha Storm Chasers of the Triple-A International League to begin the 2026 season. He played the entire season with Omaha and batted .247 with 17 home runs, 54 RBIs, and 25 stolen bases across 118 games.

== Personal life ==
Cross's father, Adam, played three seasons in the minor leagues with the Pittsburgh Pirates and San Diego Padres organizations.
