= Edbert C. Buss =

American football and basketball coach

Biographical details
- Born: April 25, 1884; Chicago, Illinois, U.S.
- Died: April 11, 1935 (aged 50); Grand Rapids, Michigan, U.S.
- Education: Michigan State

Coaching career (HC unless noted)

Football
- 1914–1915: Detroit Central HS (MI)
- 1916–1920: DePauw

Basketball
- 1914–1916: Detroit Central HS (MI)
- 1916–1921: DePauw

Baseball
- 1918: DePauw

Head coaching record
- Overall: 21–13–1 (college football); 54–24 (college basketball); 6–5(college baseball); 20–0–1 (high school football)

Accomplishments and honors

Championships
- Football; High school national (1915)

Edbert Charles Buss (April 25, 1884 – April 11, 1935) was an American football, basketball, and baseball coach. He served as the head football coach (1916–1920) and head basketball coach (1916–1921) at DePauw University in Greencastle, Indiana. Buss previously served as the head football coach at Detroit Central High School from 1914 to 1915, where his team was crowned the mythical High School Football National Champion in 1915.

Buss died at the age of 51, on April 11, 1935, in Grand Rapids, Michigan. He had undergone surgery for acute appendicitis several days earlier.
