= Virginia Middle School =

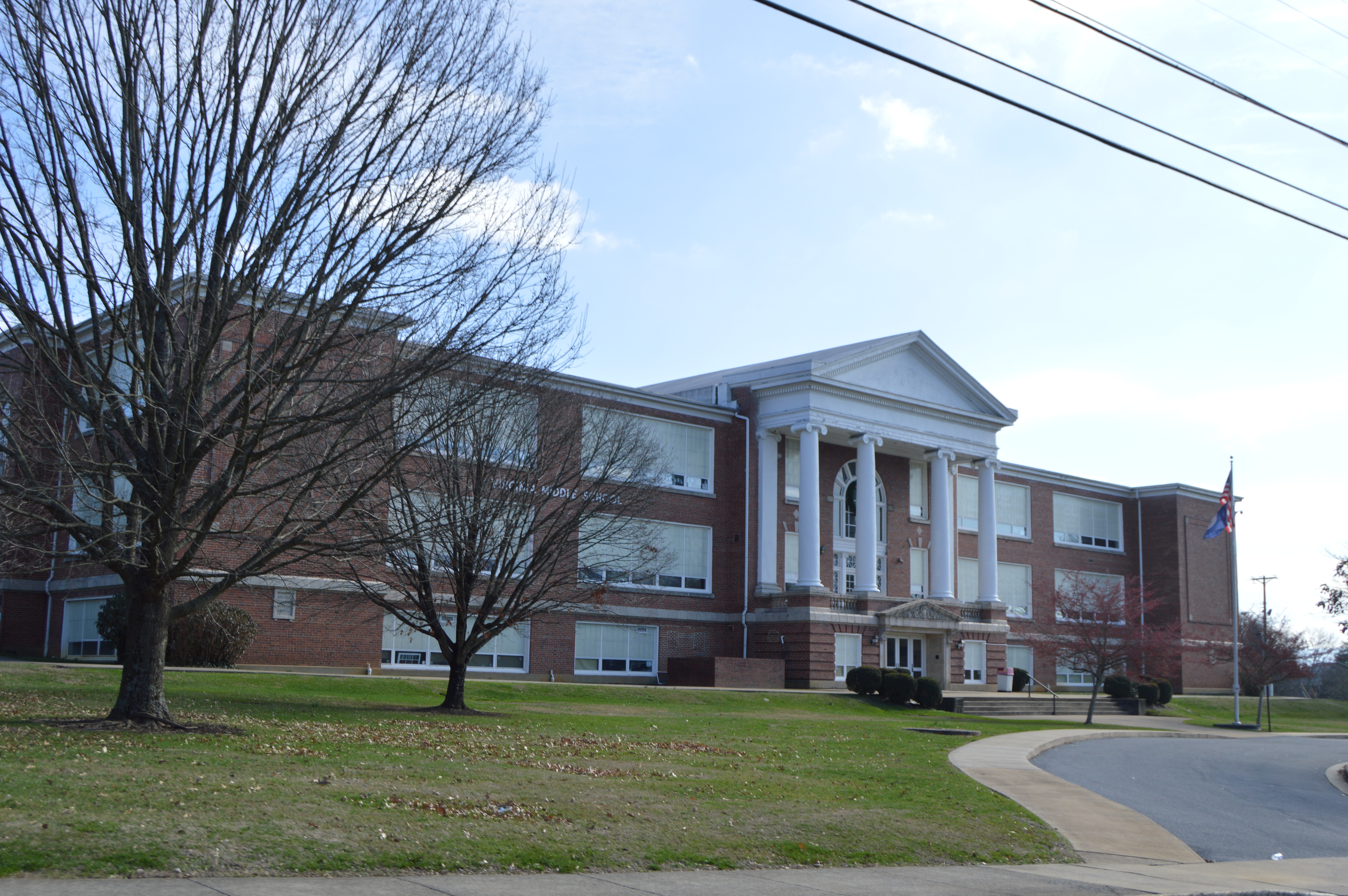
- Front of school

Location
- 501 Piedmont Avenue; Bristol, Virginia 24201; United States; 36°36′17″N 82°11′1″W

Information
- School type: Public, middle school
- School district: Bristol Virginia Public Schools
- Superintendent: Dr. Keith Perrigan
- Principal: Mrs. Amanda Chitwood
- Grades: 6-8
- Enrollment: 560 (2016)
- Language: English
- Colors: Black and Orange
- Mascot: Bearcats
- Feeder schools: Virginia Primary School, Virginia Intermediate School
- Website: Official Site
- Virginia High School
- U.S. National Register of Historic Places
- Virginia Landmarks Register
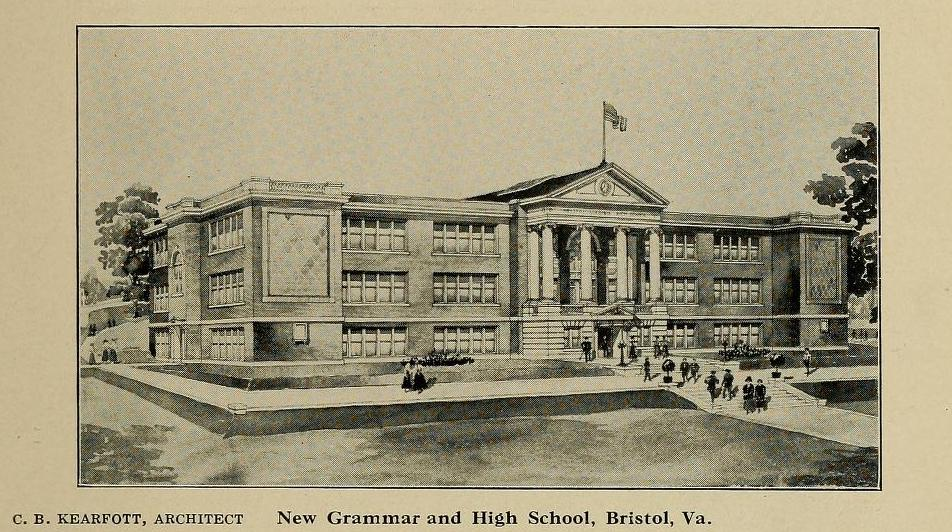
- Architectural drawing

- Location within Virginia Location within the United States
- Location: 501 Piedmont Ave., Bristol, Virginia
- Coordinates: 36°36′17″N 82°11′1″W
- Area: 5 acres (2.0 ha)
- Built: 1914
- Architect: Charles Baker Kearfott
- Architectural style: Classical Revival, Modern Movement
- NRHP reference No.: 97000159
- VLR No.: 102-0030

Significant dates
- Added to NRHP: February 21, 1997
- Designated VLR: December 4, 1996

Virginia Middle School is a former high school, is a historical landmark, and is now a middle school located in Bristol, Virginia. It is a part of Bristol Virginia Public Schools.

== History ==
Located at 501 Piedmont Avenue, the original section of the school was completed in 1914 and served as Virginia High School until 1953. In 1953, a new high school was built and this site became Virginia Junior High School serving seventh and eighth grade students. After a concept study by the School Board, the name was changed to Virginia Middle School in 1990. The school underwent an extensive renovation in 1995 and was completed for total occupancy in 1996, allowing it to serve the sixth through eighth grades. The school presently serves grades six through eight. The building was added to the Virginia Landmarks Register in 1996 and received National Register of Historic Places status in 1997.
