= Bristol Tennessee City Schools =

School district in the United States

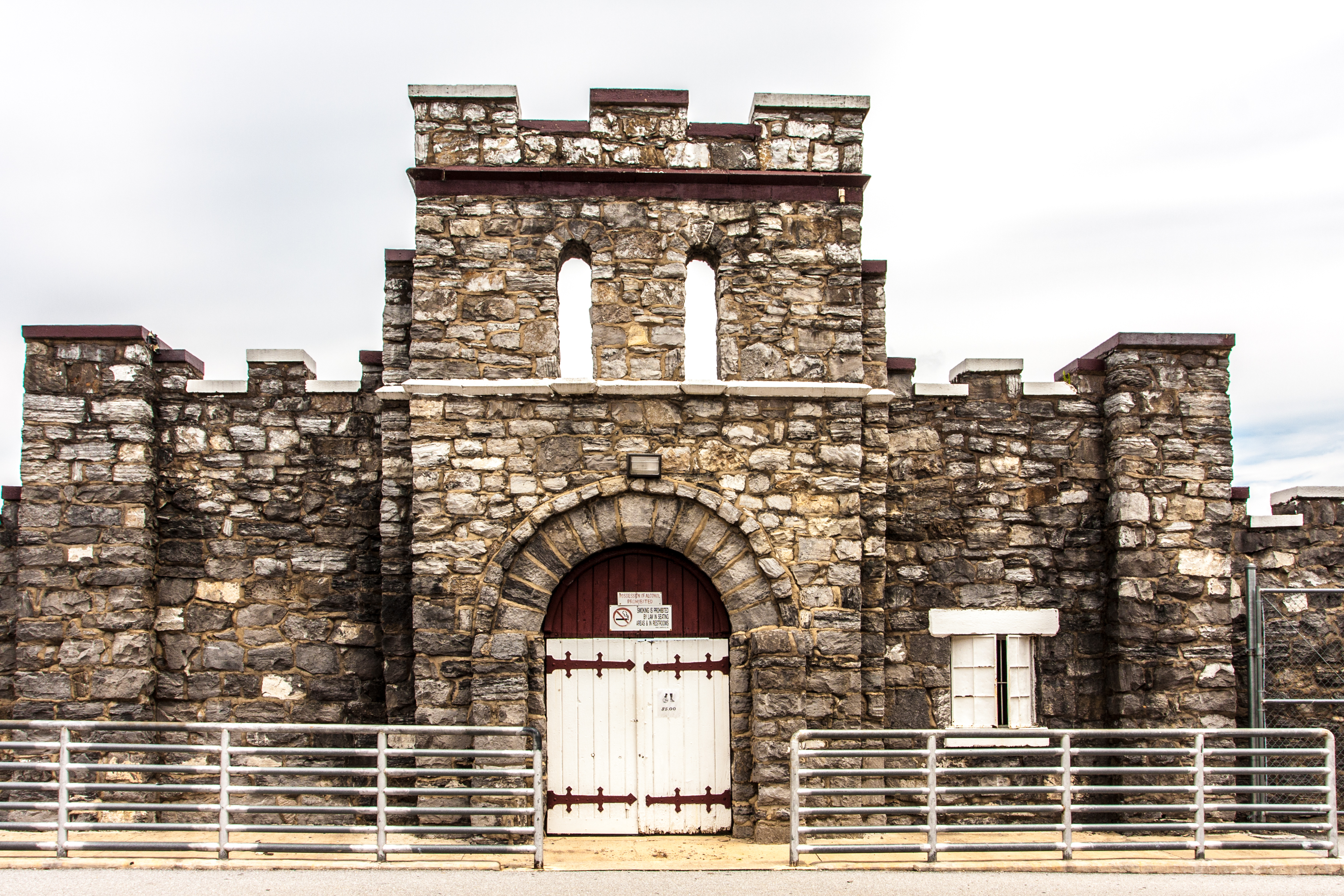
- Municipal stadium at the high school

Location
- 615 Martin Luther King Jr Boulevard; Bristol, Tennessee 37620

District information
- Motto: Engage. Challenge. Inspire.
- Director of Schools: Dr. Annette Tudor
- Chair of the board: Eric Cuddy
- Schools: 8

Other information
- Website: btcs.org

Bristol Tennessee City Schools is a school district headquartered in Bristol, Tennessee. It includes almost all of the city limits of Bristol.

== History ==
Gary Lilly served as superintendent from 2009, until he resigned in June 2019. Tom Sisk replaced him. The school board bought out Sisk's contract in 2020 when a revelation came that Sisk never received a PhD from an accredited institution even though he presented himself as having that credential. Annette Tudor became the interim superintendent.

== Schools ==
Secondary schools

- Tennessee High School
- Tennessee Middle School

Elementary schools

- Anderson Elementary School
- Avoca Elementary School
- Fairmount Elementary School
- Haynesfield Elementary School
- Holston View Elementary School

Other schools

- Tennessee Online Public School (TOPS)

== See also ==
- Viking Hall
- Bristol Municipal Stadium
- The Classic at Tennessee High School
- Bristol Virginia Public Schools - School district of Bristol, Virginia
