= Leo Novak =

American basketball coach (1890–1961)

Biographical details
- Born: September 28, 1890; Cedar Rapids, Iowa, U.S.
- Died: September 17, 1961 (aged 70); Washington, D.C., U.S.
- Education: Coe College

Coaching career (HC unless noted)

Men's basketball
- 1916–1917: Exira HS (IA)
- 1917–1925: Washington HS (IA)
- 1925–1926: Parkersburg HS (WV)
- 1926–1939: Army

Outdoor track
- 1917: Exira HS (IA)
- 1918–1925: Washington HS (IA)
- 1926: Parkersburg HS (WV)
- 1927–1949: Army

Football
- 1916: Exira HS (IA)
- 1917–1924: Washington HS (IA)
- 1925: Parkersburg HS (WV)

Cross country
- 1928–1949: Army

Indoor track
- 1942–1949: Army

Head coaching record
- Overall: 126–61 (.674) (college basketball); 96–24 (.800) (college outdoor track); 93–28 (.769) (college cross country); 11–2 (.846) (college indoor track)

Accomplishments and honors

Championships
- 1x National Interscholastic Basketball Tournament champion (1921); 2x Stagg national interscholastic track meet champion (1922, 1924); 1x High school football national champion (1924)

Leo Vencil Novak (September 28, 1890 – September 17, 1961) was an American coach who was the men's basketball, track, and cross country coach at the United States Military Academy. He previously won national championships in basketball, track, and football at Washington High School in Cedar Rapids, Iowa.

== Early life ==
Novak was born in Cedar Rapids on September 28, 1890. He competed in football, basketball, and track at Washington High School and Coe College. He was captain of Coe's 1915 football team.

== Coaching ==
After graduating from Coe, Novak spent one year as a physical education instructor and coach at Exira High School in Exira, Iowa. From 1917 to 1925, he coached basketball, football, and track at Washington High School. His football teams won 6 championships and were declared national champions of 1924 by Simon Lyons. His 1920–21 basketball team won the 1921 National Interscholastic Basketball Tournament and his 1922 and 1924 track teams won the Stagg national interscholastic meet. He developed Frank Cuhel, who broke the National Collegiate Athletic Association record in the low hurdles at the 1928 championships. In 1925, Novak left WHS to become the director of athletics at Parkersburg High School in Parkersburg, West Virginia.

In 1926, Novak was named track and basketball coach at the United States Military Academy, succeeding Gene Vidal (track) and Ernest Blood (basketball) He became the academy's cross country coach in 1928 and played a pivotal role in the creation of Army's indoor track and field program. His teams won six IC4A championships (three in track and three in cross country). He was replaced as basketball coach in 1939 by Valentine Lentz, but continued to coach Army's track and cross country teams until 1949. He finished with a career record of 126–61 in basketball, 96–24 in outdoor track, 93–28 in cross country, and 11–2 in indoor track. He is Army's all-time wins leader in men's basketball and outdoor track and field.

== Later life ==
After leaving West Point, Novak resided in Cornwall-on-Hudson, New York and worked for the New York State Thruway Authority. He retired in 1960. Novak died of cancer at the Walter Reed Army Medical Center on September 17, 1961.
