= Bruce Rollinson =

American football coach (born 1949)

Bruce Rollinson (born October 13, 1949) is a former high school football coach best known for his 34-year tenure as head coach at Mater Dei High School in Santa Ana, California, where he established the program as one of the nation's top high school football teams, winning multiple CIF Southern Section championships and national titles. Rollinson announced his retirement in November 2022. In 2023, he was inducted into the CIF Southern Section Hall of Fame. He is a Mater Dei alumnus and played college football at the University of Southern California.

== Notable players ==
Rollinson coached Matt Barkley, Bryce Young, Matt Leinart, Colt Brennan, Domani Jackson, David Bailey (American football), JT Daniels, Nikko Remigio, Amon-Ra St. Brown, Ryan Stonehouse, Eli Ricks, Max Wittek, Lenny Vandermade, David Gibson (American football), Matt Grootegoed, Austin Faoliu, Khaled Holmes, Solomon Tuliaupupu, Olive Sagapolu, Chase McGrath, Nicky Sualua, Thomas Duarte, Quentin Lake, among others.

== Head coaching record ==
=== High School ===
| Year | Team | Regular Season | | | | | Postseason |
| Year | Team | Won | Lost | Ties | Win % | Finish | Result |
|---|---|---|---|---|---|---|---|
| 1989 | Mater Dei | 7 | 4 | 0 | .636 | 2nd in Angelus League | CIF-SS Division I First Round |
| 1990 | Mater Dei | 7 | 6 | 0 | .538 | 2nd in Angelus League | CIF-SS Division I Semifinalists |
| 1991 | Mater Dei | 13 | 1 | 0 | .929 | T-1st in Angelus League | CIF-SS Division I Champions |
| 1992 | Mater Dei | 9 | 2 | 1 | .792 | 1st in South Coast League | CIF-SS Division I Quarterfinalists |
| 1993 | Mater Dei | 12 | 2 | 0 | .857 | 1st in South Coast League | CIF-SS Division I Finalists |
| 1994 | Mater Dei | 14 | 0 | 0 | 1.000 | 1st in South Coast League | CIF-SS Division I Champions |
| 1995 | Mater Dei | 10 | 2 | 0 | .833 | T-1st in South Coast League | CIF-SS Division I Quarterfinalists |
| 1996 | Mater Dei | 14 | 0 | 0 | 1.000 | 1st in South Coast League | CIF-SS Division I Champions |
| 1997 | Mater Dei | 13 | 1 | 0 | .929 | 1st in South Coast League | CIF-SS Division I Finalists |
| 1998 | Mater Dei | 13 | 1 | 0 | .929 | 1st in South Coast League | CIF-SS Division I Champions |
| 1999 | Mater Dei | 11 | 2 | 1 | .821 | 1st in Serra League | CIF-SS Division I co-Champions |
| 2000 | Mater Dei | 9 | 3 | 0 | .750 | 2nd in Serra League | CIF-SS Division I Quarterfinalists |
| 2001 | Mater Dei | 8 | 5 | 0 | .615 | 2nd in Serra League | CIF-SS Division I Semifinalists |
| 2002 | Mater Dei | 10 | 4 | 0 | .714 | 2nd in Serra League | CIF-SS Division I Finalists |
| 2003 | Mater Dei | 8 | 5 | 0 | .615 | T-1st in Serra League | CIF-SS Division I Semifinalists |
| 2004 | Mater Dei | 8 | 3 | 0 | .727 | T-1st in Serra League | CIF-SS Division I First Round |
| 2005 | Mater Dei | 9 | 4 | 0 | .692 | T-1st in Serra League | CIF-SS Division I Semifinalists |
| 2006 | Mater Dei | 8 | 3 | 0 | .727 | T-3rd in Trinity League | CIF-SS PAC-5 Division First Round |
| 2007 | Mater Dei | 9 | 2 | 0 | .818 | T-1st in Trinity League | CIF-SS PAC-5 Division Quarterfinalists |
| 2008 | Mater Dei | 8 | 4 | 0 | .667 | T-1st in Trinity League | CIF-SS PAC-5 Division Quarterfinalists |
| 2009 | Mater Dei | 6 | 5 | 0 | .545 | 3rd in Trinity League | CIF-SS PAC-5 Division First Round |
| 2010 | Mater Dei | 8 | 5 | 0 | .615 | 3rd in Trinity League | CIF-SS PAC-5 Division Semifinalists |
| 2011 | Mater Dei | 4 | 6 | 0 | .400 | 4th in Trinity League | No playoffs, did not qualify |
| 2012 | Mater Dei | 11 | 3 | 0 | .786 | 2nd in Trinity League | CIF-SS PAC-5 Division Finalists |
| 2013 | Mater Dei | 11 | 3 | 0 | .786 | 2nd in Trinity League | CIF-SS PAC-5 Division Finalists |
| 2014 | Mater Dei | 9 | 3 | 0 | .750 | 3rd in Trinity League | CIF-SS PAC-5 Division Quarterfinalists |
| 2015 | Mater Dei | 10 | 3 | 0 | .769 | 2nd in Trinity League | CIF-SS PAC-5 Division Semifinalists |
| 2016 | Mater Dei | 13 | 1 | 0 | .929 | 1st in Trinity League | CIF-SS Division 1 Finalists |
| 2017 | Mater Dei | 15 | 0 | 0 | 1.000 | 1st in Trinity League | CIF-SS Division 1 Champions |
| 2018 | Mater Dei | 13 | 2 | 0 | .867 | 2nd in Trinity League | CIF-SS Division 1 Champions |
| 2019 | Mater Dei | 12 | 1 | 0 | .923 | 1st in Trinity League | CIF-SS Division 1 Finalists |
| 2020 | Mater Dei | 5 | 0 | 0 | 1.000 | 1st in Trinity League | No playoffs due to COVID-19 |
| 2021 | Mater Dei | 12 | 0 | 0 | 1.000 | 1st in Trinity League | CIF-SS Division 1 Champions |
| 2022 | Mater Dei | 12 | 1 | 0 | .923 | 1st in Trinity League | CIF-SS Division 1 Finalists |
| Total | | 341 | 87 | 2 | .795 | | |
