= Tennessee High School =

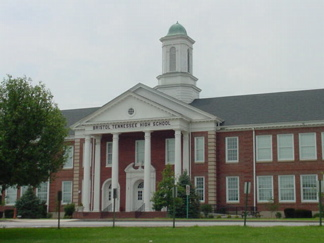
- Front entrance

Location
- 1112 Edgemont Ave. Bristol, Tennessee 37620; United States; 36°34′53.8″N 82°10′55.7″W

Information
- School type: Public, high school
- Established: 1916
- School district: Bristol Tennessee City Schools
- Superintendent: Annette Tudor
- Principal: Kim Kirk
- Teaching staff: 72.70 (FTE)
- Grades: 9-12
- Enrollment: 1,179 (2023-2024)
- Student to teacher ratio: 16.22
- Language: English
- Colors: Maroon and White
- Mascot: Viktor the Viking
- Rivals: Virginia High School, Sullivan East High School
- Feeder schools: Tennessee Middle School
- Website: ths.btcs.org

Tennessee High School is a public high school located in Bristol, Tennessee, operated as part of the Bristol Tennessee City Schools school district. The high school serves almost all of the Bristol city limits.

== History ==
The first official Tennessee High School opened in 1916 on Alabama Street. The first part of the current campus was built in 1939. The Bristol Municipal Stadium, also known as the Stone Castle, hosts football and soccer games and was built in 1936 as part of the New Deal. In 1965, after desegregation, students from Slater High School were transferred to Tennessee High School. Viking Hall, which opened in 1981, is Bristol Tennessee's civic center and the location of Tennessee High basketball games.

== Academics ==
The school offers two paths of study for students, a university path and a technical path. The school offers Advanced Placement courses and participation in Army JROTC. The school also has the oldest school newspaper in Tennessee, Maroon and White, which has been in publication for over 100 years.

== Extracurricular activities ==
Each February, the school participates in a fund raising drive for the American Heart Association called "Queen of Hearts" with Virginia High School, Sullivan East High School and John S. Battle High School.

== Athletics ==
Tennessee High won the 1972 High School Football National Championship as well as the 1971 and 1972 Tennessee state football championships.

== Notable alumni ==
- Ernie Ford - entertainer
- Dave Loggins - singer and songwriter
- Gavin Cross - baseball player in the Kansas City Royals organization
- Steve Godsey - Former Member of the Tennessee House of Representatives from the 1st district, and Former Sullivan County mayor
- Jaden Keller - football player for the New York Jets of the National Football League
- Jason Mumpower - 35th Comptroller of the Treasury of Tennessee, and former member of the Tennessee House of Representatives from the 3rd district

== See also ==
- Viking Hall
- The Classic at Tennessee High School
