= The Classic at Tennessee High School =

U.S. high school basketball tournament

- Nickname: The Classic
- Status: Active
- Genre: Basketball tournament
- Begins: December 26
- Ends: December 31
- Frequency: Annually, during the last week of December
- Venue: Viking Hall
- Location: Bristol, Tennessee
- Coordinates: 36.5805°N 82.1835°W
- Country: United States
- Years active: 42
- Established: 1983
- Founders: Bill Bingham, Dale Burns
- Most recent: December 31, 2025
- Attendance: ~30,000 (as of 2016)
- Sponsor: Toyota of Bristol, formerly Arby's
- Website: thsclassic.com

The Classic at Tennessee High School, formerly known as The Arby's Classic, which has continued its presence after a move to Virginia High School in Bristol, VA, is an annual high school basketball double-elimination tournament that takes place during the last week of December, in Bristol, Tennessee. The five-day tournament is held at Viking Hall by Bristol Tennessee City Schools, the governing school board.

Notable participants include East Tennessee State Buccaneers head coach Brooks Savage, and NBA players Mac McClung, Noah Clowney, and Tim Hardaway Jr..

== History ==
The tournament was created in 1983 by William "Bill" Bingham and Dale Burns as the Mountain Empire Classic. AES Restaurant Group, an Arby's franchisee that operated within the area, sponsored the tournament in exchange for naming rights.

In December 2016, the Bristol Chamber of commerce released a study in partnership with AES Restaurant Group stating that the direct economic impact of the Arby's Classic is $1.59 million annually, with a direct impact of $3.4 million. The report also provides an average spectator count of 30,000.

In July 2024, BTCS announced they were renaming the tournament as they were unable to come to an agreement with AES Restaurant Group, citing disagreements over naming rights. AES owner, John Wade, noted that "they decided to end our relationship because they wanted to take our money but they didn't want to call it the Arby's Classic." The Arby's Classic now takes place at Virginia High School. BTCS revealed in August that Toyota of Bristol became their title sponsor.

== Tournament Champions ==
Past Winners
Year	Champion (State/Country if outside TN)
1983	Pulaski County High School (VA)
1984	Daniel Boone High School
1985	Sullivan North High School
1986	Louisville Male High School (KY)
1987	Patrick Henry High School (VA)
1988	Dobyns-Bennett High School
1989	Whites Creek High School
1990	Whites Creek High School
1991	Patrick Henry High School
1992	Dobyns-Bennett High School
1993	Science Hill High School
1994	Westside High School (GA)
1995	Science Hill High School
1996	Miami Senior High School (FL)
1997	Wheeler High School (GA)
1998	Northwest Christian (FL)
1999	Science Hill High School
2000	Louisville Male High School (KY)
2001	Ballard High School (KY)
2002	Wheeler High School (GA)
2003	Bradley Central High School
2004	Benjamin Elijah Mays High School (GA)
2005	Brentwood Academy
2006	Dr. Michael M. Krop Senior High School (FL)
2007	Briarcrest Christian School
2008	Boyd H. Anderson High School (FL)
2009	Melrose High School
2010	Columbia High School (GA)
2011	Christ School (NC)
2012	Urspring Academy (Germany)
2013	Greater Atlanta Christian School (GA)
2014	North Mecklenburg High School (NC)
2015	Wayne High School (OH)
2016	Trinity High School (KY)
2017	North Mecklenburg High School (NC)
2018	Bearden High School
2019	Mountain Brook High School (AL)
2020	Cancelled due to the COVID-19 pandemic
2021	Long Island Lutheran High School (NY)
2022	Myers Park High School (NC)
2023	Carlton J. Kell High School (GA)
2024	Calvary Christian Academy (FL)
2025	Webb School of Knoxville
