= Dan Dougherty =

American basketball coach (1935–2022)

Daniel J. Dougherty (October 12, 1935 – October 24, 2022) was an American basketball coach. He was the head coach of the Army Black Knights men's basketball team for four seasons from 1971 to 1975. Bobby Knight coached basketball at Army before Dougherty and Mike Krzyzewski held the position after Dougherty left. Prior to coaching the Black Knights in West Point, New York, Dougherty was an assistant coach with Villanova in Villanova, Pennsylvania.

Dougherty was also a high school basketball coach for Malvern Preparatory School in Malvern, Pennsylvania and Episcopal Academy in Newtown Square, Pennsylvania. He retired from coaching in 2010. He died at the age of 87 in 2022.
