= Orvis Sigler =

American basketball and baseball coach (1922–2016)

Biographical details
- Born: June 22, 1922; Springfield, Missouri, U.S.
- Died: December 31, 2016 (aged 94); Shreveport, Louisiana, U.S.

Playing career
- 1946–1947: Southwest Missouri State

Coaching career (HC unless noted)

Basketball
- ?–?: West Plains HS
- ?–1953: Southwest Missouri State (assistant)
- 1953–1954: Missouri Valley
- 1954–1958: Army
- 1958–1968: Centenary

Baseball
- 1972–1973: Centenary

Orvis Utopia Sigler Jr. (June 22, 1922 – December 31, 2016) was an American college basketball and baseball coach, known for his tenures as head coach at Army and Centenary.

Sigler served in the United States Navy during World War II. Upon his return, he studied and played college football at Southwest Missouri State University (now Missouri State). Following his graduation, Sigler turned to coaching. Sigler started coaching at West Plains High School in West Plains, Missouri. He then went on to serve as an assistant to head coach Bob Vanatta at his alma mater, Southwest Missouri State. After a year as head coach at Missouri Valley College, he was named his former boss Vanatta's successor as head coach at Army.

After four seasons and a 53–56 record, Sigler left West Point in 1958 to become head coach and athletic director at Centenary College in Shreveport, Louisiana. In ten seasons from 1958 to 1968, Sigler compiled a record of 122–134 with the Gentlemen. He also served as the school's head baseball coach for the 1972 and 1973 seasons.

Sigler died on December 31, 2016, at his home in Shreveport.
