= Dino Gaudio =

American basketball coach

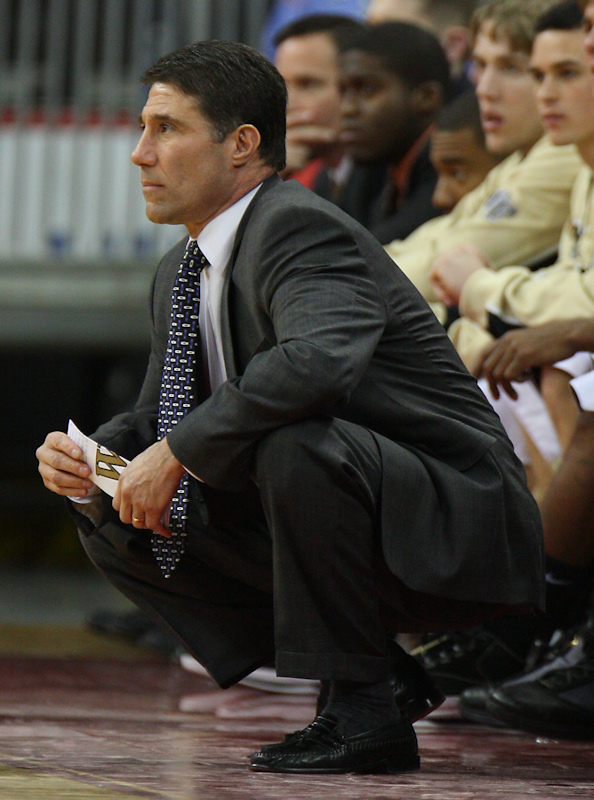
- Gaudio in 2010

Biographical details
- Born: March 30, 1957 (age 69); Martins Ferry, Ohio, U.S.
- Education: Ohio University (BA); Xavier University (MS)

Coaching career (HC unless noted)
- 1980–1984: Wheeling Central HS (assistant)
- 1984–1987: Wheeling Central HS
- 1987–1993: Xavier (assistant)
- 1993–1997: Army
- 1997–2000: Loyola (MD)
- 2000–2001: Xavier (assistant)
- 2001–2007: Wake Forest (assistant)
- 2007–2010: Wake Forest
- 2018–2021: Louisville (assistant)

Head coaching record
- Overall: 129–155 (college)
- Tournaments: 1–2 (NCAA Division I)

Dino Joseph Gaudio (born March 30, 1957) is an American former men's college basketball coach and broadcaster who was most recently an assistant coach at the University of Louisville in Louisville, Kentucky.

Gaudio was a longtime assistant under Skip Prosser, serving under him beginning at Wheeling Central Catholic High School in West Virginia and eventually following him to Xavier University in Cincinnati, Ohio and later to Wake Forest University in Winston-Salem, North Carolina; after Prosser's death in 2007, Gaudio was hired to succeed him and remained there as head coach until 2010.

In addition to his time at Wake Forest, Gaudio also served as head coach of the boys’ basketball team Wheeling Central Catholic High School (succeeding Prosser), as well as the men's teams at the United States Military Academy in West Point, New York and Loyola University in Baltimore, Maryland (where he again succeeded Prosser).

== Biography ==
=== Education ===
Gaudio is a graduate of Ohio University (1981) and Xavier University (master's in secondary education, 1991).

=== Wake Forest ===
Gaudio remained loyal to Prosser, his mentor and predecessor at Wake Forest. In the final days of his life, Prosser attended the games of three 5-star recruits in Las Vegas and Orlando. These recruits remained committed to Wake Forest and made up an eventual number-three-ranked recruiting class for the 2008–09 season, signed by Gaudio as a memory to Prosser.

Gaudio tallied three winning seasons at Wake Forest, making the NCAA Tournament in two out of three years. In 2008–09, his Deacons raced out to a 16–0 start and rose to the number-one spot in the rankings for only the second time in school history. However, they went out with a thud, losing in the first round of the ACC Tournament to Maryland before getting blown out by 13-seed Cleveland State in the first round of the NCAA Tournament. A year later, they made another early exit in the ACC Tournament. While they won their first-round NCAA Tournament game, they were drilled by Kentucky in the second round. Gaudio was fired a few weeks later.

=== Broadcasting ===
Gaudio became an announcer for ESPN's college basketball coverage in 2011.

=== Louisville ===
After seven years with ESPN and out of coaching, Gaudio was hired by Chris Mack to be an assistant for the Louisville Cardinals men's basketball team. Mack and Gaudio were previously assistants together at Wake Forest from 2001 to 2004, before Mack left to become an assistant and later head coach at Xavier University.

On March 18, 2021, Gaudio's contract was not renewed after Mack hinted at a staff shake-up during his season-ending press conference. Gaudio was then charged with one federal count of attempting to extort money and other things of value from the University of Louisville, according to information released by Michael Bennett, the acting U.S. Attorney for the Western District of Kentucky. According to the charge, Gaudio, during an in-person meeting with Louisville officials on March 17, 2021, "threatened to report to the media allegations that the University of Louisville men's basketball program had violated [NCAA] rules in its production of recruiting videos for prospective student-athletes and its use of graduate assistants in practice, unless the University of Louisville paid [Gaudio] his salary for an additional 17 months or provided the lump sum equivalent of 17 months of salary." Louisville officials said in a statement: "As detailed in the charging document, after Gaudio was informed that his contract would not be renewed, he threatened to inform members of the media of alleged NCAA violations within the men's basketball program unless he was paid a significant sum of money. The allegations of violations are the impermissible production of recruiting videos for prospective student-athletes and the impermissible use of graduate managers in practices and workouts. While the University cannot comment further due to the ongoing federal investigation and the NCAA process, it continues to cooperate with authorities as well as with the NCAA on the matter." On August 22, 2021, he was sentenced to one year of probation and a $10,000 fine.

== Head coaching record ==
=== College ===
Record table
Season	Team	Overall	Conference	Standing	Postseason
Army Cadets (Patriot League) (1993–1997)
1993–94	Army	7–20	4–10	T–7th	
1994–95	Army	12–16	4–10	7th	
1995–96	Army	7–20	2–10	6th	
1996–97	Army	10–16	4–8	6th	
Army:		36–72 (.333)	14–38 (.269)		
Loyola Greyhounds (Metro Atlantic Athletic Conference) (1997–2000)
1997–98	Loyola	12–16	9–9	T–5th	
1998–99	Loyola	13–15	6–12	9th	
1999–00	Loyola	7–21	4–14	9th	
Loyola:		32–52 (.381)	19–35 (.352)		
Wake Forest Demon Deacons (Atlantic Coast Conference) (2007–2010)
2007–08	Wake Forest	17–13	7–9	T–7th	
2008–09	Wake Forest	24–7	11–5	T–2nd	NCAA Division I First Round
2009–10	Wake Forest	20–11	9–7	5th	NCAA Division I Second Round
Wake Forest:		61–31 (.663)	27–21 (.563)		
Total:		129–155 (.454)			
