= Valentine Lentz =

American college basketball coach (1897–1980)

Biographical details
- Born: August 3, 1897; Baltimore, Maryland, U.S.
- Died: May 20, 1980 (aged 82)

Playing career

Basketball
- 1926–1927: Baltimore Orioles

Coaching career (HC unless noted)
- 1919–1921: St. John's (MD)
- 1921–1923: Vocational HS (MD)
- 1923–1929: Calvert Hall
- 1930–1938: St. John's (MD)
- 1939–1943: Army
- 1947–1951: Second Army

Administrative career (AD unless noted)
- 1919–1921: St. John's (MD)
- 1921–1929: Calvert Hall
- 1930–1939: St. John's (MD)

Valentine William "Dutch" Lentz (August 3, 1897 – May 20, 1980) was an American athlete and coach who was the head men's basketball coach St. John's College in Annapolis, Maryland, and the United States Military Academy in West Point, New York.

== Early life ==
Lentz was born in Baltimore on August 3, 1897 to William and Julianna (Stahl) Lentz. He was a member of the track, soccer, football, baseball, basketball, and rifle teams Baltimore Polytechnic Institute. He was on the football, baseball, track, and basketball teams at St. John's College. He graduated in 1918 and spent a year in the military, where he was a member of the camp basketball and boxing teams. Lentz played baseball with the Reading Aces, Buffalo Bisons, Easton Farmers, and Cambridge Canners, professional basketball with the Baltimore Orioles, and soccer with the Patapsco Rangers.

== Coaching ==
Lentz was the athletic director at St. John's College from 1919 to 1921. He then became a teacher and coach at Baltimore's Vocational School. He became the athletic director at Calvert Hall College High School in 1923, but continued to teach at the Vocational School until 1926. He left Calvert Hall in 1929 when he and the school were unable to agree on financial terms for a new contract. He returned to St. John's in 1930 as athletic director, head basketball coach, and assistant football coach. His 1933–34 team won the Maryland Collegiate Championship. In 1938, St. John's dropped its intercollegiate athletic program and Lentz resigned effective the following June.

On October 10, 1939, Lentz was named head coach of the Army Cadets men's basketball team. In his four seasons in West Point, Letz compiled a 39–39 record.

== Military service ==
In 1942, Lentz, who had been a reserve officer since 1918, was called to active duty and appointed supply officer of the West Point Station Hospital. During World War II, he served in North Africa and Italy.

In 1947, Lentz was named manager of the Second Army baseball team. He also coached the unit's basketball team.

During the Korean War, Lentz was the commander of the Army and Air Force Recruiting and Induction Main Station in Alexandria, Virginia.
