= Franklin Hughes Delano =

American diplomat and merchant

- Born: July 27, 1813; Dartmouth, Massachusetts
- Died: December 23, 1893 (aged 80); Monte Carlo, Monaco
- Occupations: Diplomat, merchant
- Spouse: Laura Eugenia Astor (m. 1844)
- Relatives: Delano family

Franklin Hughes Delano (July 27, 1813 – December 23, 1893) was an American merchant, diplomat and society man.

== Early life ==
Delano was born in Dartmouth, Massachusetts on July 27, 1813 and grew up in Fairhaven. He was a son of Captain Warren Delano and Deborah Perry (née Church) Delano. Among his siblings was brother Warren Delano Jr. After his mother's death in 1827, his father, who was involved in the New England sea trade, remarried to Elizabeth Adams, a widow of Captain Parker of the United States Navy.

A descendant of Philip Delano (a Pilgrim who arrived in Plymouth, Massachusetts in 1621), Franklin's paternal grandparents were Ephraim Delano and Elisabeth (née Cushman) Delano, and his maternal grandparents were Joseph Church and Deborah (née Perry) Church. Through his brother Warren, Franklin was the uncle of Warren Delano IV, Frederic Adrian Delano, and Sara Delano Roosevelt (the mother of Delano's grand-nephew and namesake, Franklin Delano Roosevelt).

== Career ==
Delano was involved, and partners, in a number of financial ventures, including shipping ventures, with his brothers Warren, Frederick, and Edward. (Note: Franklin's brothers, Warren and Edward Delano were both members of the shipping firm of Russell and Company at Guangzhou, China in the early 1840s.) In January 1839, he became a partner in the New York shipping firm of Grinnell, Minturn & Company. He served as U.S. Consul for Chile at New York, (Note: His distant cousin, Paul Delano (1775–1847), moved to Chile in 1818, became associated with Thomas Cochrane, 10th Earl of Dundonald, and served as a commander of the Chilean Department of the Navy.) from 1840 until 1851, when he resigned that office and also retired as an active partner in Grinnell, Minturn & Co. After his marriage, Delano joined his father-in-law in the Astor family business, located on Pearl Street in New York City, and assisted in managing the large piece of property in New York City his wife had inherited.

After his retirement in 1851, Delano and his wife traveled to Europe, and later, spent much of their time in Italy and Monte Carlo.

In the 1850s, Delano, along with his brother Warren and Asa Packer (the builder of the Lehigh Valley Railroad and founder of Lehigh University), headed a land company that purchased several thousand acres and established the town of Delano, Pennsylvania. Delano also served as the company president of the Selma, Rome and Dalton Railroad, the largest railroad in Alabama, due to the Astor family's ownership of a large block of stock. The Selma, Rome and Dalton Railroad was formed by the consolidation of Alabama and Tennessee River Rail Road Co. (incorporated in 1848), the Georgia and Alabama Rail Road Co. (incorporated in 1854), and the Dalton and Jacksonville Railroad Co. (incorporated in 1854) on August 6, 1866. Delano handed over day-to-day management of the railroad to Captain E. G. Barney.

== Personal life ==
In September 1844, Delano was married to heiress Laura Eugenia Astor. Laura was a daughter of William Backhouse Astor Sr. and Margaret (née Armstrong) Astor, and a sister of, among others, John Jacob Astor III and William Backhouse Astor Jr. (husband of the Mrs. Astor). Reportedly, Laura was the favorite granddaughter of John Jacob Astor, the founding Astor family patriarch and America's first millionaire who died in 1848, four years after their marriage. Her maternal grandparents were John Armstrong Jr. (a U.S. Senator, U.S. Minister to France under Thomas Jefferson and U.S. Secretary of War under James Madison) and Alida (née Livingston) Armstrong.

In New York City, the Delanos lived at 190 Madison Avenue. Franklin Delano was a member of the Union Club (which he joined in 1839, three years after its founding in 1836), the Knickerbocker Club, the Century Club, the New England Society, and the American Geographic Society.

Around 1890, due to failing health, Delano moved abroad and after traveling for a year, took up residence in Monte Carlo, Monaco, where he died on December 23, 1893. His widow died in 1902.

=== Steen Valeitje ===
As a wedding gift, Laura's father gifted the couple the southernmost 100 acres of his Rokeby estate. The estate came to be known as "Steen Valetje" (which means "little stone valley" in Dutch). The Tuscan-style mansion, designed by Frank Wills, was completed in 1851. In 1866, William Astor Sr. conveyed the adjoining 142 acres of Rokeby to his son, Henry. Henry Astor built a brick dwelling on this land, but in 1873, conveyed the property to Laura, thus expanding "Steen Valetje". A gatehouse, designed by William Schickel & Co. was added in 1874. The mansion was expanded in 1881 by architect Thomas Stent.

The Astors and the Delanos commissioned German-born landscape gardener Hans Jacob Ehlers to improve the grounds at Rokeby and Steen Valetje. Ehlers converted an old farm track into a woodland path called the Poet's Walk in honor of poets Washington Irving and Fitz-Greene Halleck, who are said to have strolled there. It is now Poets' Walk Park, managed by the not-for-profit Scenic Hudson.

As Delano and his wife both died childless, he left Steen Valetje to his nephew, coal baron Warren Delano IV. Warren IV was very involved in horse breeding, with over sixty saddle, driving, and draft horses at his stables at "Steen Valetje". He died September 9, 1920, when, while picking up a trunk at the Barrytown train station, his carriage horse was frightened by an approaching northbound New York Central express, and dashed onto the tracks with the buggy carrying Delano, who was killed instantly. His funeral was held at "Steen Valetje" and was attended by his nephew Franklin D. Roosevelt, then the Democratic vice presidential nominee.

Jennie Walters Delano, Warren IV's wife, died two years later in 1922. Their son Lyman inherited "Steen Valetje," remodeled it in the Georgian style and renamed it "Mandara"; his family kept the home until 1967 when it was sold to financier William Stix Wasserman. The new owner again renamed the estate: "Atalanta." In September 2022, the estate was acquired by billionaire Joseph Bae; it is once again known as "Steen Valetje."
