= Warren Delano =

Warren Delano may refer to:

- Warren Delano Jr., American merchant, grandfather of Franklin D. Roosevelt
- Warren Delano IV, American horseman and coal tycoon
- Warren Lyford DeLano, advocate for the increased adoption of open source practices in the sciences
