= The Third-Class Carriage =

Paintings by Honoré Daumier

The Third-Class Carriage (New York)
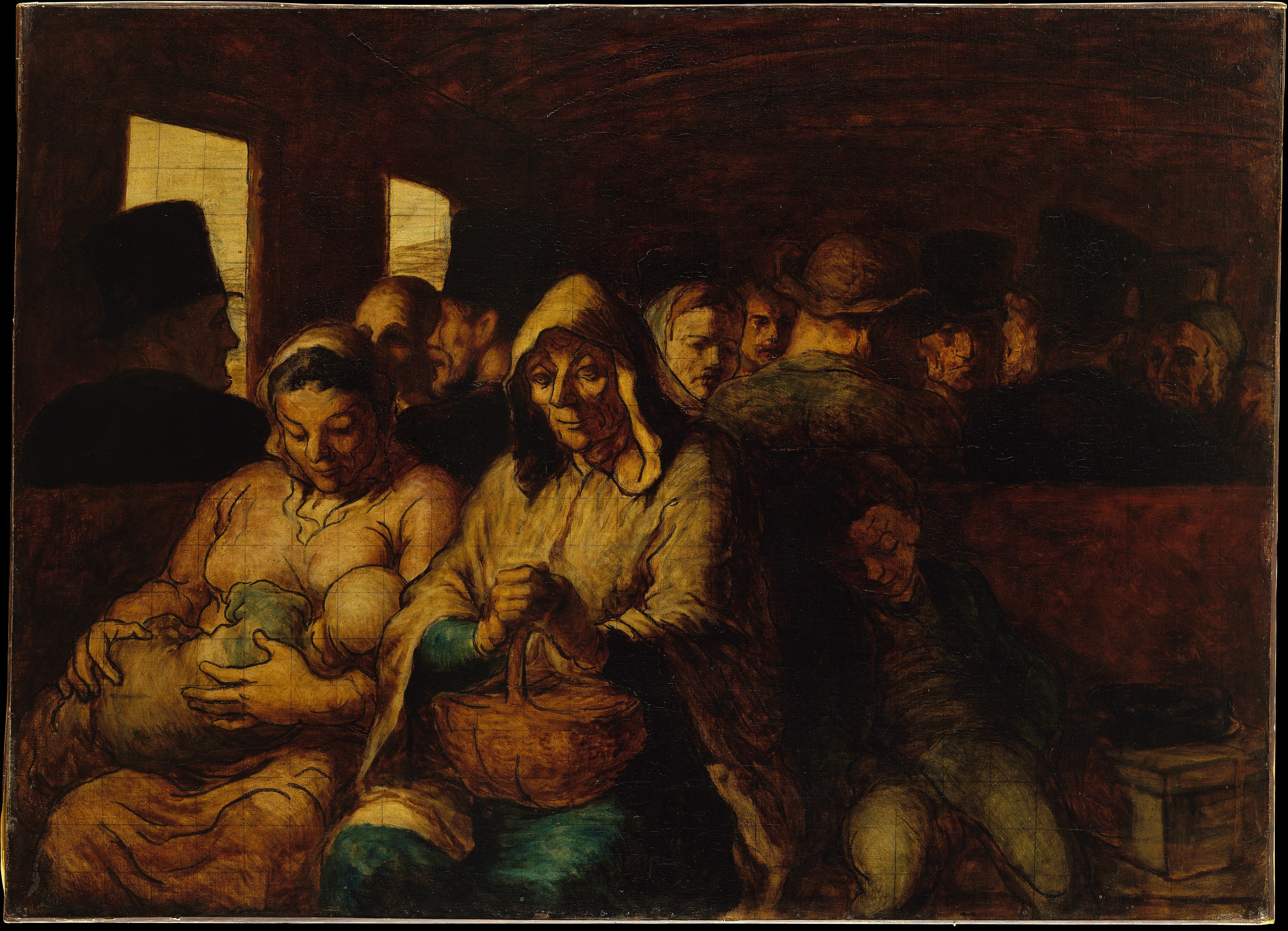
- Artist: Honoré Daumier
- Year: c. 1862–1864
- Medium: Oil on canvas
- Dimensions: 65.4 cm × 90.2 cm (25.7 in × 35.5 in)
- Location: Metropolitan Museum of Art, New York

The Third-Class Carriage (Ottawa)
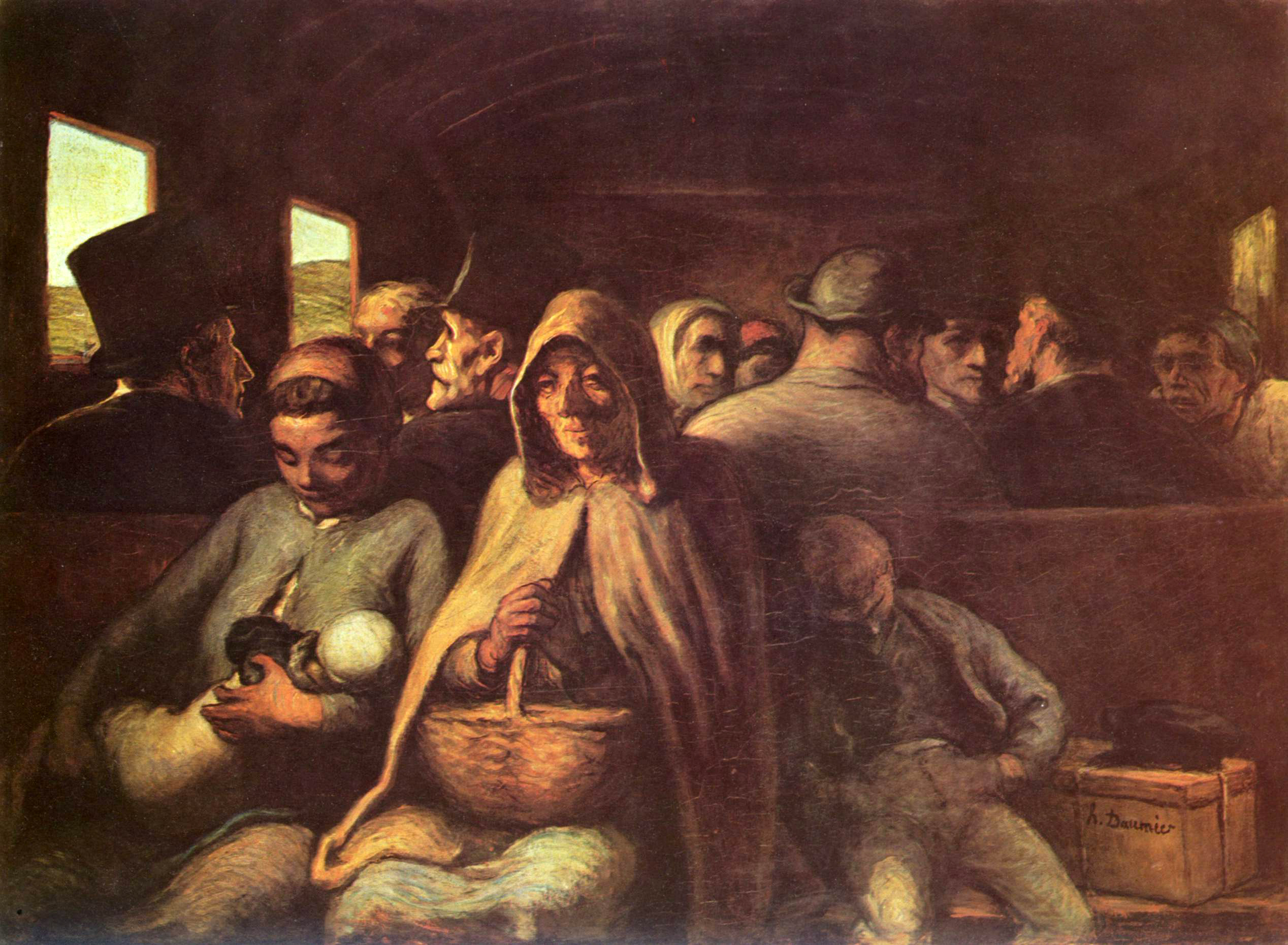
- Artist: Honoré Daumier
- Year: c. 1863–1865
- Medium: Oil on canvas
- Dimensions: 65.4 cm × 90.2 cm (25.7 in × 35.5 in)
- Location: National Gallery of Canada, Ottawa

The Third-Class Carriage (San Francisco)
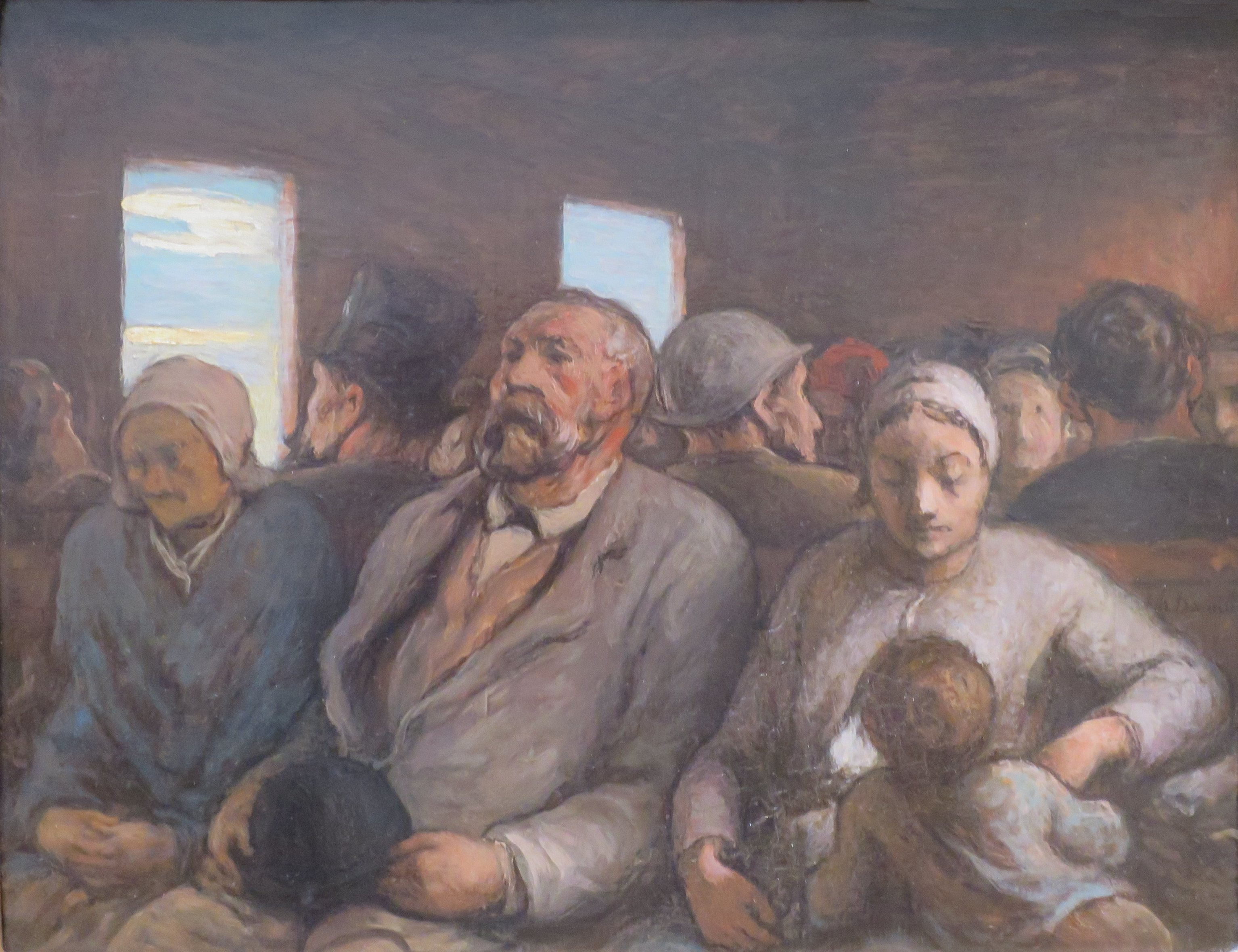
- Artist: Honoré Daumier
- Year: c. 1856–1858
- Medium: Oil on panel
- Dimensions: 26 cm × 33.9 cm (10 in × 13.3 in)
- Location: Fine Arts Museums of San Francisco, San Francisco

The Third-Class Carriage (French: "Le Wagon de troisième classe") is the name of at least three oil paintings by the French painter Honoré Daumier. In a realistic manner, Daumier depicts the poverty and fortitude of working-class travellers in a third-class railway carriage. One oil-on-canvas version, dated to c. 1862–1864 but left unfinished, is in the collection of the Metropolitan Museum of Art in New York, and a similar but completed painting dated to c. 1863–1865 is in the National Gallery of Canada in Ottawa. A third oil-on-panel version, dated to c. 1856–1858, with a different arrangement of the main three figures, is held by the Fine Arts Museums of San Francisco.

== Background ==
Daumier had drawn and painted images of rail travel since the 1840s, focussing on the people travelling rather than the conveyances. His series of lithographs, Les Chemins de Fer ("the railway") was published in the French magazine Le Charivari from 1843 to 1858, including prints published in December 1856 with the captions "Voyageurs appréciant de moins en moins les wagons de troisième classe, pendant l'hiver" ("Travellers showing less and less appreciation for travelling in third class in the winter") and "Intérieur d'un wagon de troisième classe pendent l'hiver" ("Interior of a third-class railway carriage in winter").

The paintings relate to Daumier's three watercolors with ink and charcoal, now in the Walters Art Museum in Baltimore - one for each of the first-, second- and third-class carriages - which were commissioned in 1864 by George A. Lucas for William Thompson Walters. Three working drawings of the same subject have also survived, perhaps tracings, including one in the Bibliothèque nationale de France. It seems two of the oil paintings were worked on concurrently, but the sequence of the paintings is not clear and the one in New York was left unfinished.

Daumier was best known as an illustrator, and his paintings remained unknown until an exhibition held by Paul Durand-Ruel in Paris in 1878, the year before Daumier's death.

== Description ==
The Third-Class Carriage evidences Daumier's interest, as also seen in his graphic works, in the lives of working-class Parisians. Third-class railway carriages were cramped, dirty, open compartments with hard wooden benches, filled with those who could not afford second- or first-class tickets.

The versions in New York and Ottawa are both oil-on-canvas, and measure 65.4 cm × 90.2 cm (25.7 in × 35.5 in). On the wooden bench seat facing the viewer are seated, from left, a woman nursing her baby, an older woman with her hands clasped atop a basket, and a young boy asleep. The figures may be intended to be peasants, influenced by Jean-François Millet. Seated behind them are anonymous rows of men and women.

=== New York version ===
The painting in New York is dated to c. 1862–1864 but remains unfinished. It is still squared for transfer, possibly from the Walters watercolor or another earlier work, with areas outlined in black. It was owned by the art dealer J. Duz when it was exhibited at the École des Beaux-Arts in Paris in 1888. It was sold to Paul Durand-Ruel's gallery in Paris in 1892, and transferred to the New York branch the following year. It was sold in 1896 to M.C.D. Borden, and after his death in 1912 it was sold by his estate in 1913 for US$40,000 and acquired by Louisine Havemeyer, the wife of H. O. Havemeyer. After her death in 1929, it entered the Met's collection in 1929 as part of the H. O. Havemeyer bequest.

=== Ottawa version ===
The version in Ottawa is completed, signed on the baggage to the lower right, and dated to c. 1863–1865. It was owned by the art dealer Hector Brame when it was shown at the Durand-Ruel exhibition in 1878.

It was acquired by the National Gallery of Canada in 1946 from Gordon Cameron Edwards. There are some small differences: the positions of the man with the top hat against the window to the left and of the sleeping boy in the centre-right differ; the central woman with headscarf appears older in the version in Ottawa, whereas the man with blue headcovering to the far right appears younger in the Ottawa version. The details of the people in the background also differ.

=== San Francisco version ===
The third version was acquired by the Fine Arts Museums of San Francisco in 1996, using funds from several bequests.

Unlike the versions in New York and Ottawa, the version in San Francisco is oil-on-panel, and somewhat smaller, measuring 26 cm × 33.9 cm (10.2 in × 13.3 in). It was thought to have a later date, but the Fine Arts Museums of San Francisco dates it c. 1856–1858.

The three principal characters are different from those in the other versions: an elderly woman whose eyes are closed and whose hands are clasped in her lap; a bearded man in a suit holding his hat in his lap; and a young woman looking at the young child standing in front of her.

== Related works ==
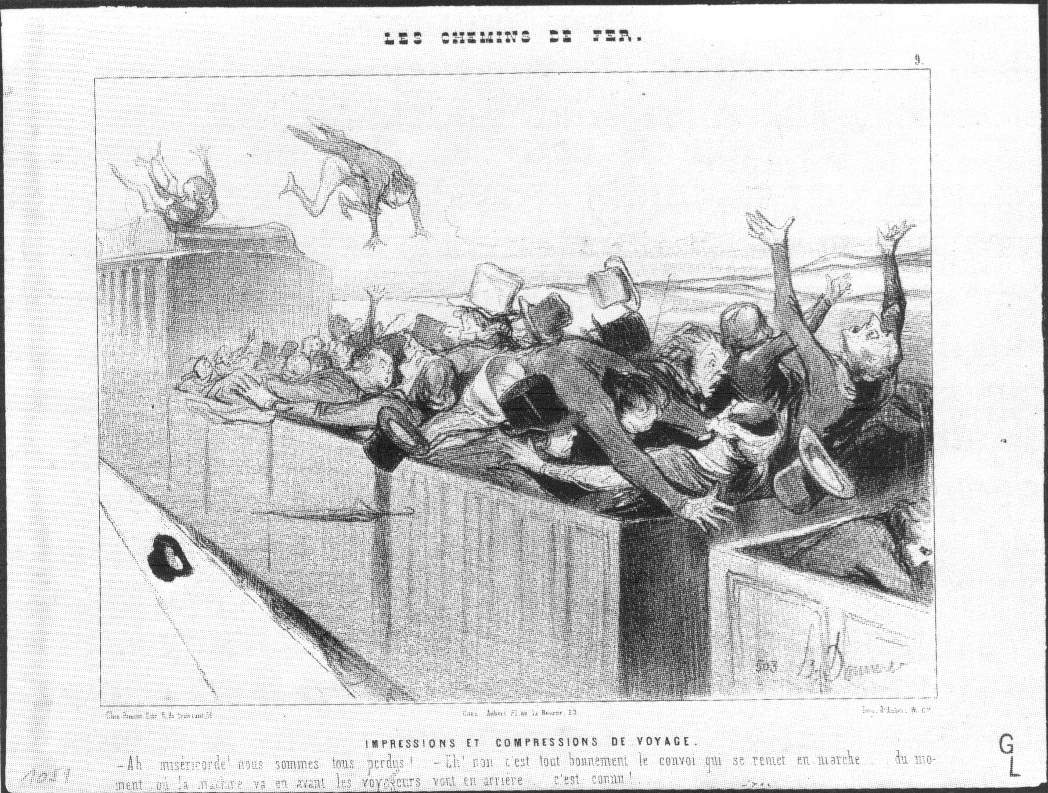
Impressions et Compressions de voyage, 1853. Lithograph

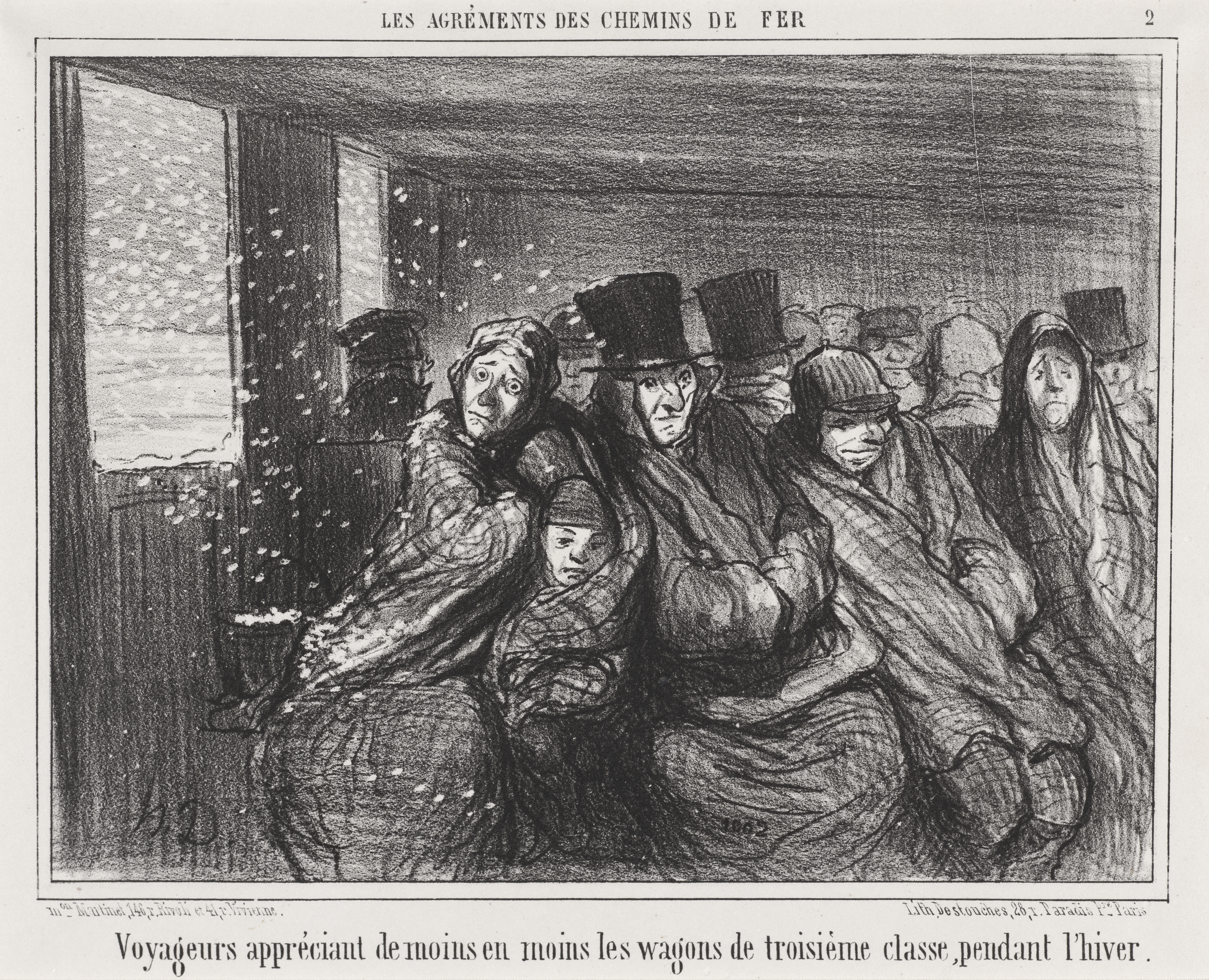
Voyageurs appréciant de moins en moins les wagons de troisième classe, pendant l'hiver, 1856. Lithograph

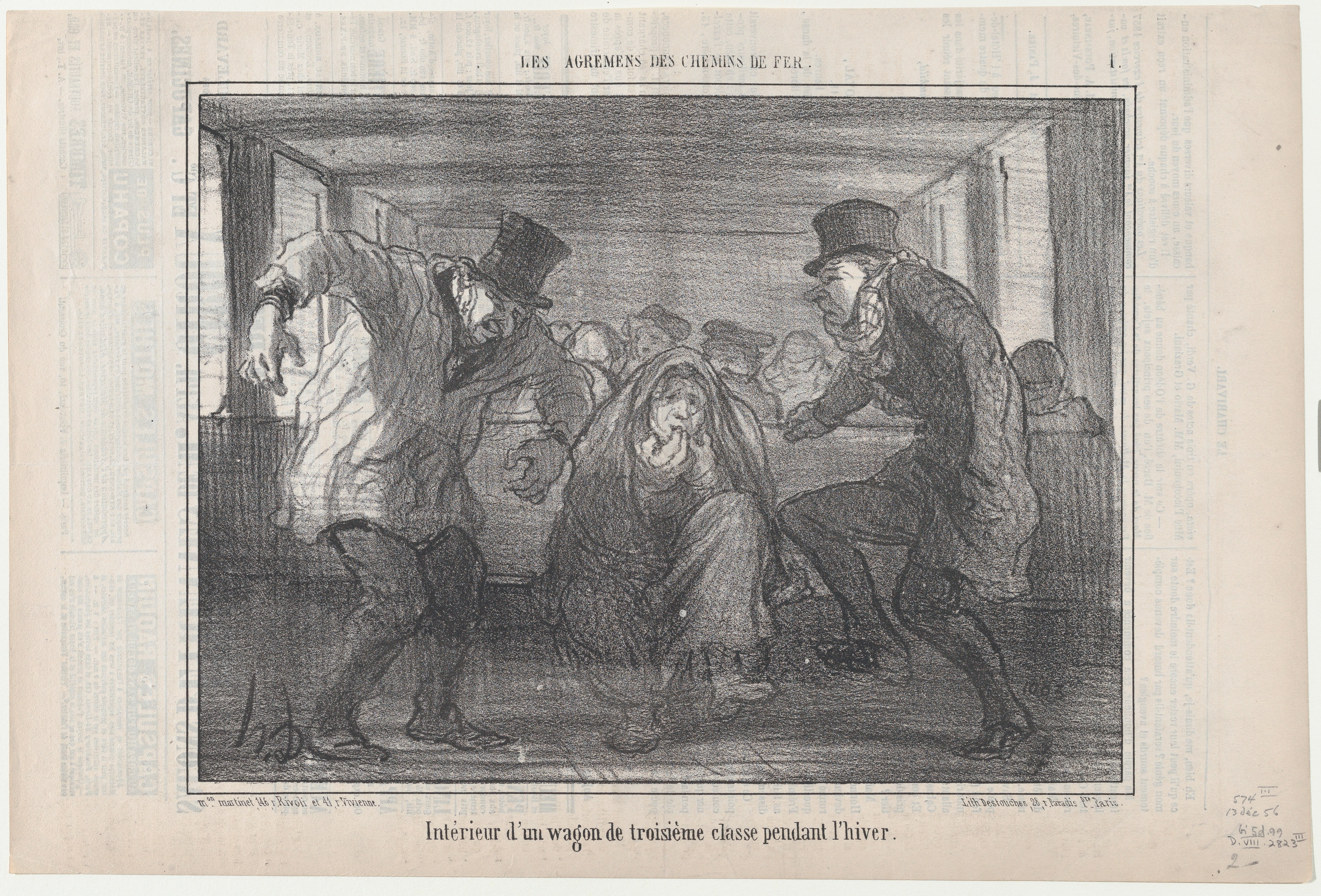
Intérieur d'un wagon de troisième classe pendent lihiver, from Le Charivari, 13 December 1856

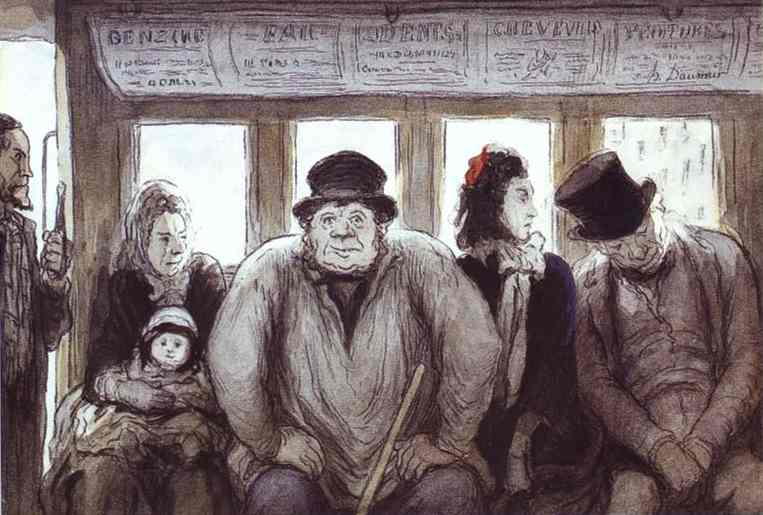
The Omnibus, 1864. Crayon and watercolor. Walters Art Museum, 21.2 cm × 30.2 cm (8.3 in × 11.9 in)
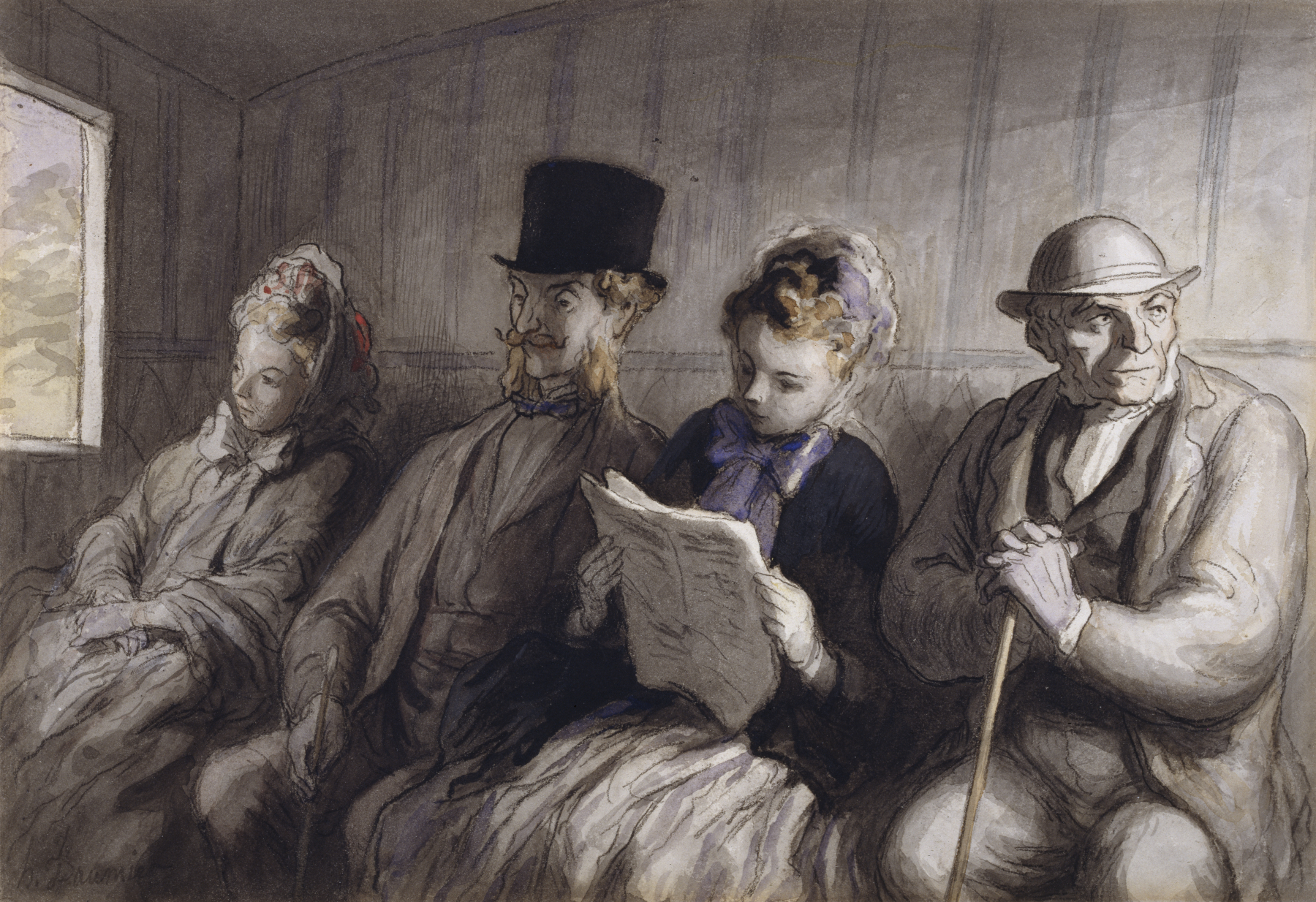
The First Class Carriage, watercolor. Walters Art Museum, 20.3 cm × 29.5 cm (8.0 in × 11.6 in)

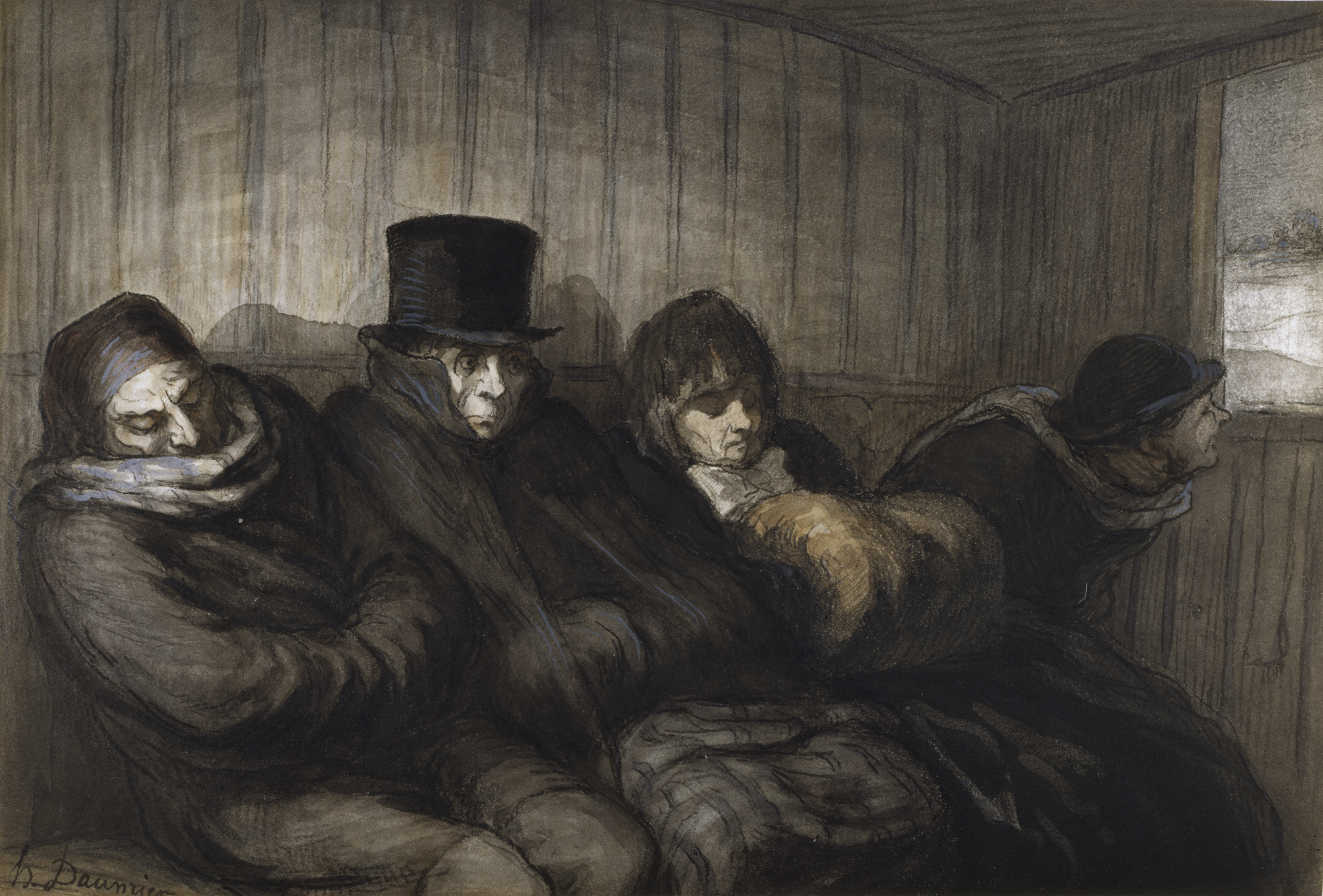
The Second Class Carriage, watercolor. Walters Art Museum, 20.3 cm × 29.5 cm (8.0 in × 11.6 in)

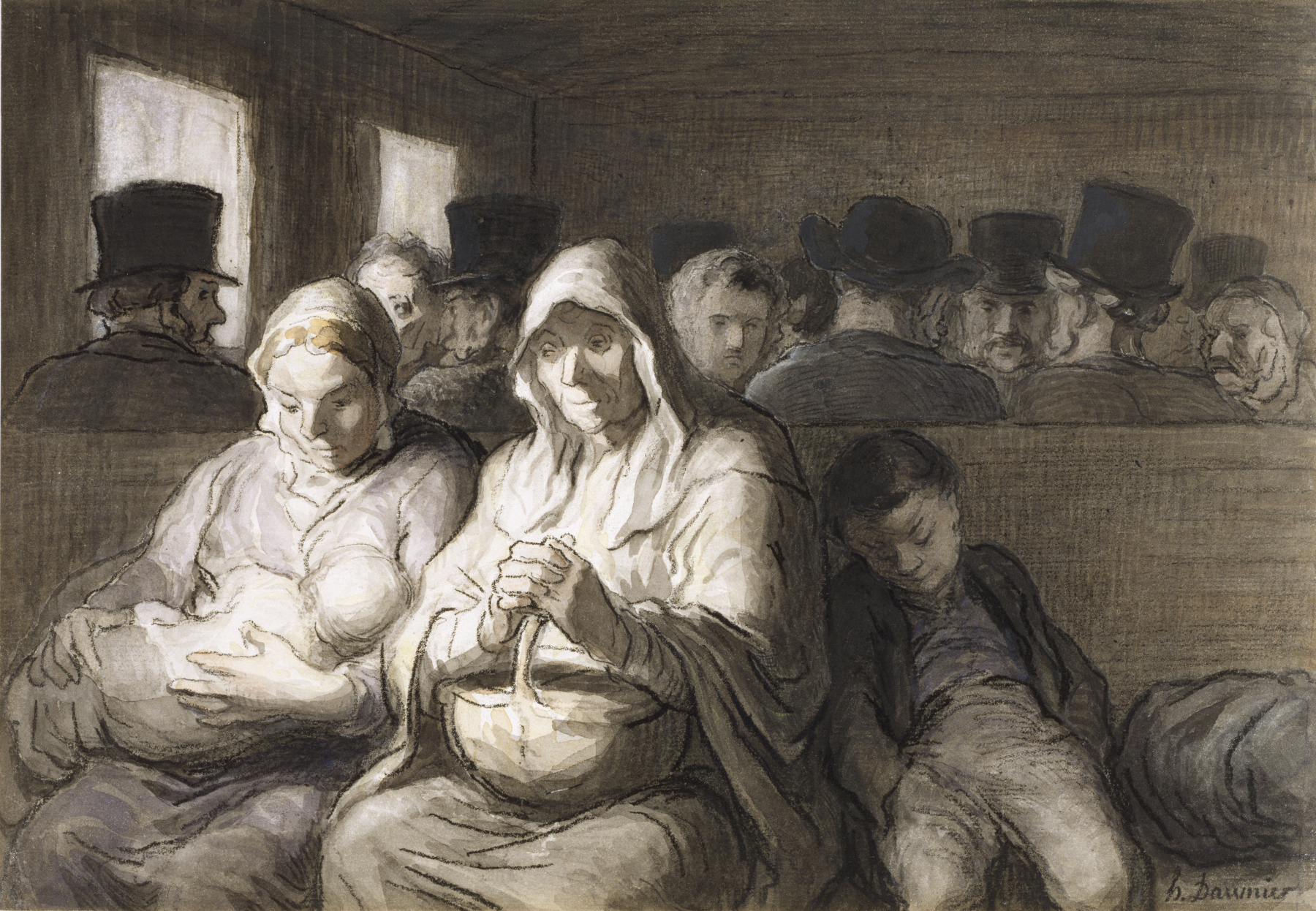
The Third Class Carriage, watercolor. Walters Art Museum, 20.3 cm × 29.5 cm (8.0 in × 11.6 in)
