= Warren Delano IV =

American business executive (1852–1920)

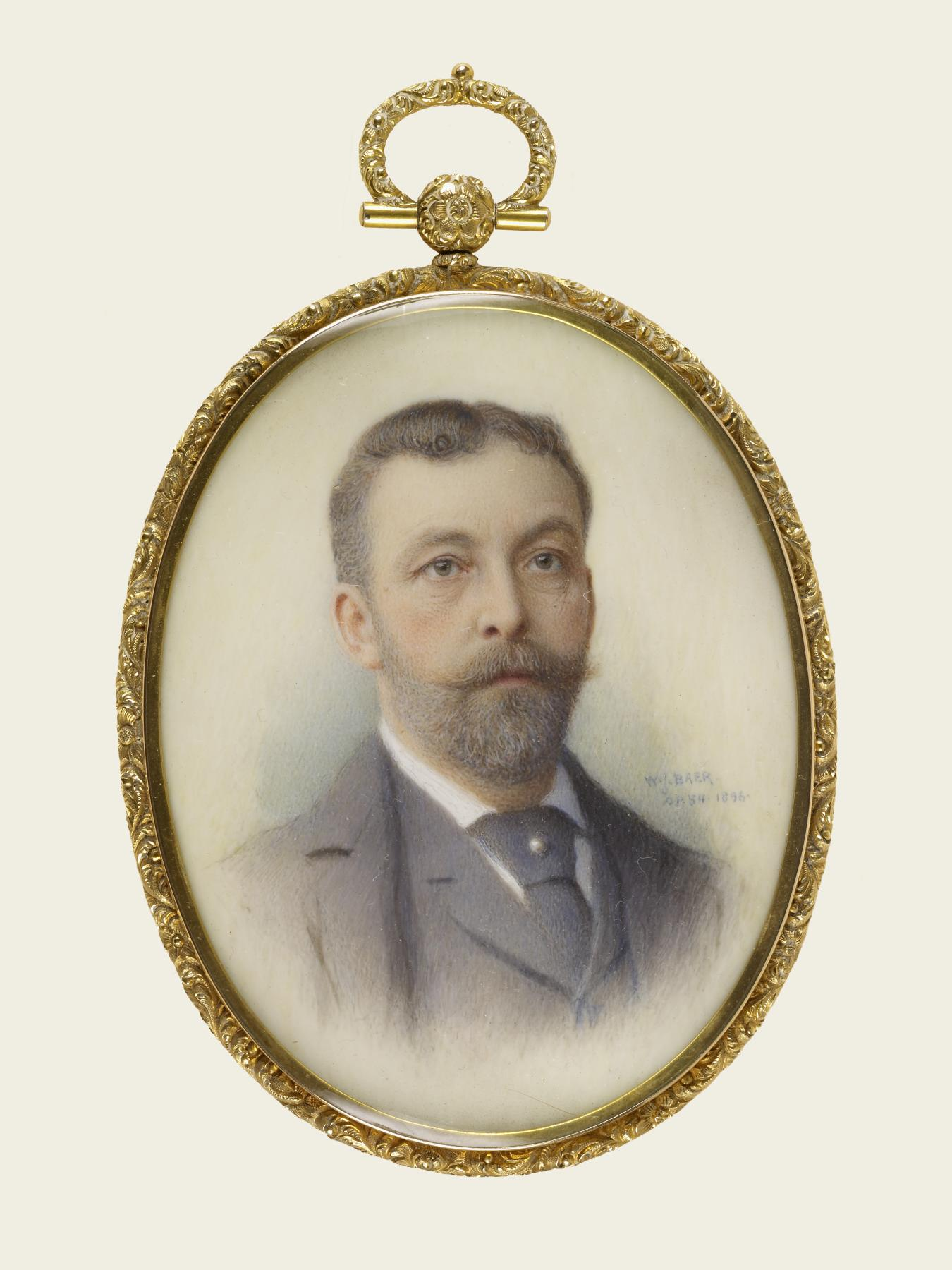
- Miniature watercolor of Delano on ivory, by William Jacob Baer, 1896
- Born: July 11, 1852; Newburgh, New York, U.S.
- Died: September 9, 1920 (aged 68); Barrytown, New York, U.S.
- Education: Harvard University
- Spouse: Jean Walters (m. 1876)
- Children: Warren V; Lyman; Ellen; Jean; William; Laura; Sara
- Parents: Warren Delano Jr.; Catherine Robbins Lyman
- Relatives: Sara Ann Delano (sister); Frederic Delano (brother); Franklin D. Roosevelt (nephew)

Warren Delano IV (Note: Although commonly referred to as Warren Delano III, he was, in fact, Warren Delano IV, as his elder brother, who was born in 1850, was named Warren Delano III and died in infancy before Warren Delano IV's subsequent birth in 1852.) (July 11, 1852 – September 9, 1920) was an American horseman and coal tycoon.

== Early life ==
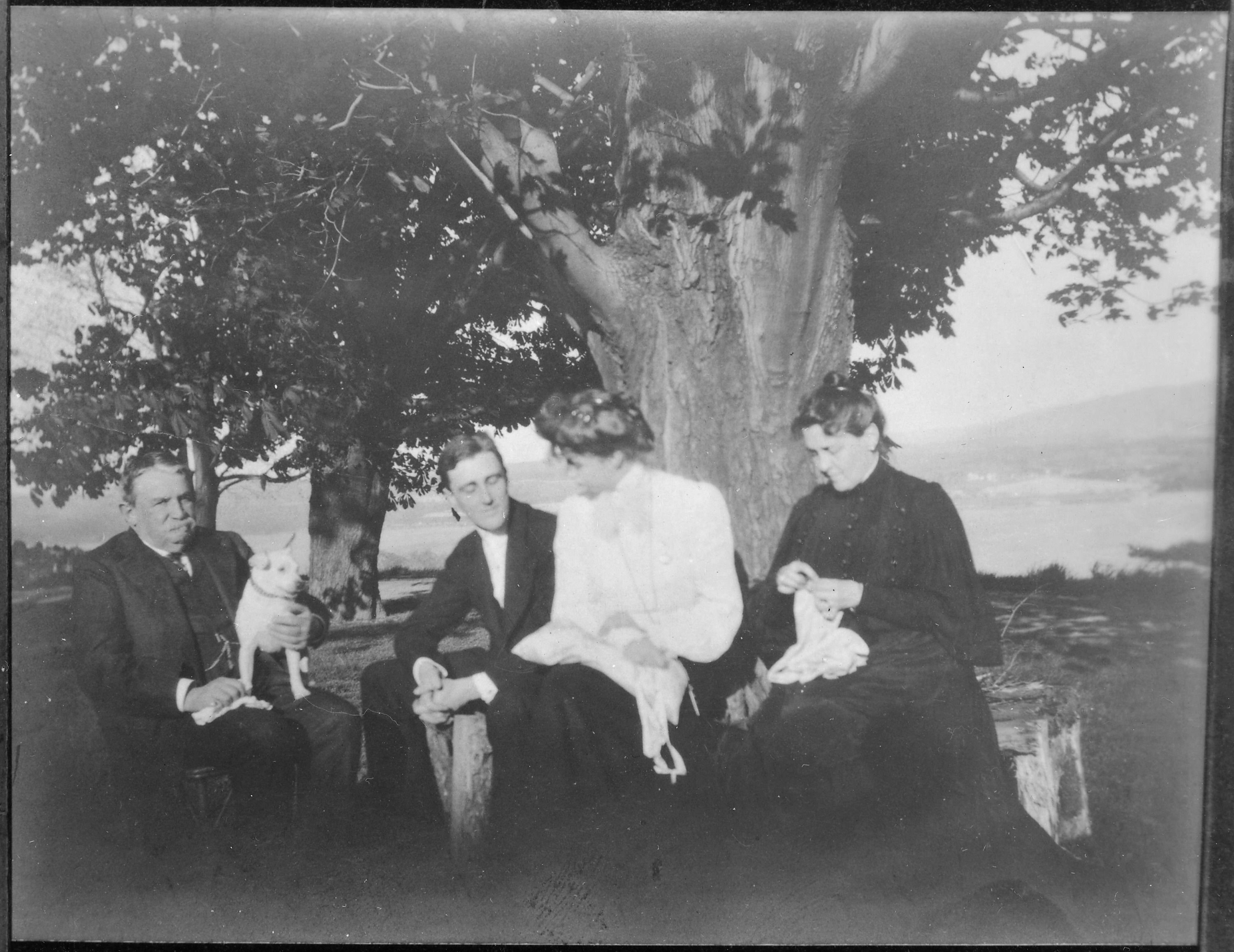
Delano (left), with Franklin and Eleanor Roosevelt and Delano's sister, Sara Delano Roosevelt in Newburgh, New York, in 1905.

Delano was born at Algonac, the family estate in Balmville near Newburgh, New York in 1852. He was a member of the Delano family as a son of prominent opium trader, Warren Delano Jr. (1809–1898), and Catherine Robbins (née Lyman) Delano (1825–1896). Among his siblings were younger sister Sara Ann Delano (the mother of U.S. President Franklin Delano Roosevelt) and younger brother Frederic Adrian Delano, a railroad president.

His paternal grandfather was Captain Warren Delano Sr., who was involved in the New England sea trade, and his maternal grandfather was Judge Joseph Lyman of Massachusetts. His paternal uncle, Franklin Hughes Delano, was married to Laura Astor, a daughter of William Backhouse Astor Sr. and sister of John Jacob Astor III and William Backhouse Astor Jr. (husband of Caroline Schermerhorn Astor). Reportedly, Laura was the favorite granddaughter of John Jacob Astor, the founding family patriarch who was America's first millionaire.

In his youth, he was reportedly barred from his best friend Dick Aldrich's home, Rokeby, for spiking the punch at one of Aldrich's mother's parties (Margaret Aldrich, the wife of Richard Aldrich). Delano attended and graduated from Harvard University in 1874, where his future wife attended private art classes.

== Career ==
Delano served as the president of the Delano Coal Company, one of the largest coal operations in Pennsylvania. Delano was known as a subsidiary of the Lackawanna Steel Company. Delano Coal owned the Buena Vista Furnace, a hot blast iron furnace built in 1847, that by the time it was acquired in 1901, consisted of 20,000 acres (81 km^{2}) of coal land in Indiana and Cambria counties. He also served as vice president of the Louisville and Nashville Railroad.

In 1901, Delano founded Wehrum, Pennsylvania, a non-union company town for the Lackawanna Iron and Coal Company, which contained 230 houses, a hotel, company store, jail, bank, post office, school, and two churches. Wehrum was the largest town of what is now a series of ghost towns along the "Ghost Town Trail" that were abandoned when the mines declined and closed in the 1930s (the mines were eventually sold to the Bethlehem Mines Corporation in 1922). He also founded Vintondale, Pennsylvania in Cambria County, and served as the President of Vinton Colliery Company and mayor of the town.

As of his death in 1920, Delano was a director of the Union Mining Company, served as president of the Delano Coal Company, and was chairman of the board of the Vinton Colliery Company.

== Personal life ==
In 1876, Delano was married to Jean "Jennie" Walters (1853–1922), much to her father's disappointment and discouragement as Jennie was his only daughter and companion following her mother's untimely death while abroad in 1862. Jennie was the daughter of William Thompson Walters, a merchant and art collector, and the sister of Henry Walters, who formed the Walters Art Museum from their father's collection. Together, they lived in Orange, New Jersey, then New York City, before moving to Rhinebeck-on-Hudson, and were the parents of seven children, five of whom survived to adulthood, one son and four daughters:

- Warren Delano V (1877–1882), who died young.
- Lyman Delano (1883–1944), Chairman of the L&N and Atlantic Coast Line railroads, who married Leila Chapin Burnett (1886–1936) in 1908.
- Ellen Walters Delano (1884–1976), who married philanthropist Frederick Baldwin Adams (1878–1961).
- Jean Walters Delano (1889–1953), who married George Harold Edgell (1887–1954), a director of the Boston Fine Arts Museum, in 1914.
- Laura Franklin Delano (1885–1972), who never married and was a close friend of Helen Huntington, the first wife of Vincent Astor. Laura was also the inspiration for the character of Madge Telfair in Thomas Wolfe's novel, Of Time and the River.
- William Walters Delano (1892–1892), who died in infancy.
- Sara Delano (1894–1983), who married Roland Livingston Redmond (1892–1982).

On September 9, 1920, Delano was killed when the horse he was riding frightened by an approaching New York Central train, dashed onto the tracks at Barrytown, killing him instantly. His widow died two years later in 1922. His funeral was held at Steen Valetje in Barrytown and was attended by his nephew Franklin, then the Democratic vice presidential candidate.

=== Steen Valetje residence ===
In 1875, Delano inherited Steen Valetje (which means "little stone valley" in Dutch), the estate built in 1851 for his uncle Franklin Hughes Delano on a wedding gift of land from the Astors' nearby Rokeby estate. Franklin died childless. In 1881, Delano hired New York architect Thomas Stent to expand the property.

At Steen Valetje, Delano moved his family and devoted himself to breeding horses. At the time of his death, he had a stable of 65 horses, including saddle and driving horses and heavy draft horses, and was an officer of the Springbrook Driving Park Association. His son Lyman inherited Steen Valetje and his family kept the home until 1966 when it was sold by the family.
