= William Thompson Walters =

American businessperson and art collector

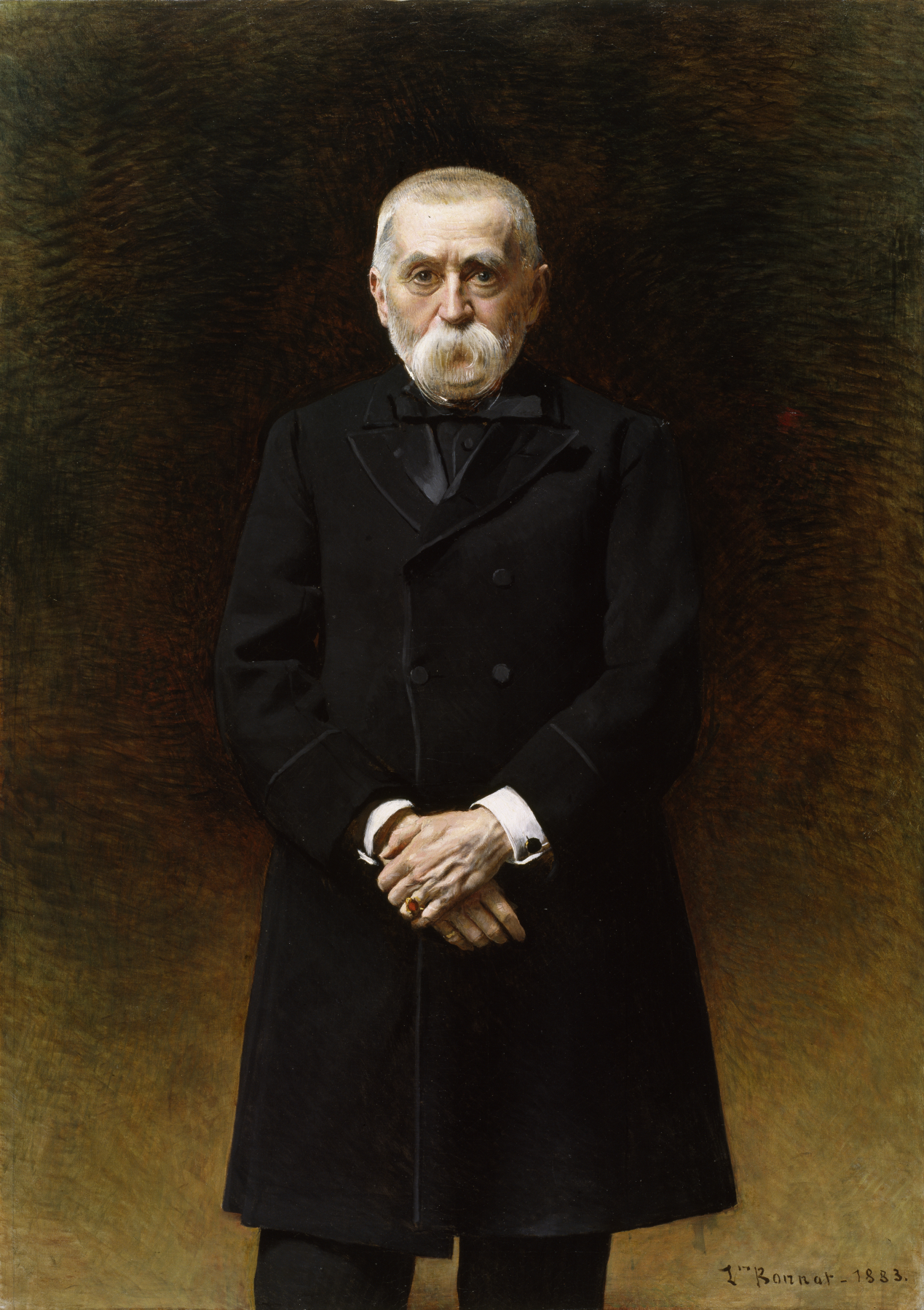
- Walters in 1883 by French artist Léon Bonnat
- Born: May 23, 1820; Liverpool, Pennsylvania, U.S.
- Died: November 22, 1894 (aged 74); Baltimore, Maryland, U.S.
- Resting place: Green Mount Cemetery in Baltimore
- Education: University of Pennsylvania
- Occupation: Merchant
- Known for: Founding the Atlantic Coast Line Railroad Amassing a significant art collection forming the basis of Walters Art Museum
- Spouse: Ellen Harper (m. 1846; died 1862)
- Children: Henry Walters; Jennie Walters Delano

William Thompson Walters (May 23, 1820 – November 22, 1894) was an American businessman and art collector, whose collection formed the basis of the Walters Art Museum.

== Early life and education ==
Walters was born on the Juniata River in Liverpool, Pennsylvania, on May 23, 1820. He was the son of the Scotch-Irish banker Henry Walters.

Walters studied civil engineering at the University of Pennsylvania.

== Career ==
=== Engineer ===
While educated as a civil engineer, he became interested in the coal and iron industry. While directing a smelting establishment in Lycoming County, Pennsylvania, Walters produced the first iron manufactured from mineral coal in the United States.

In 1841, he moved to Baltimore, where he worked as a grain merchant and, in 1847, became a liquor wholesaler by establishing the importing firm of William T. Walters & Co.

=== Art collector ===
On November 1, 1859, Walters established a relationship with George A. Lucas, an American art dealer who had recently begun his career in Paris. He commissioned Lucas to order a painting from Hugues Merle depicting Hester Prynne, the work was completed in April 1861. Around the same time, shortly before the outbreak of the American Civil War, Walters asked Lucas to assist him in settling in Paris with his family.

Lucas provided extensive assistance that went beyond his role as an art dealer, helping Walters secure an apartment, negotiate its rent, and purchase furniture and household goods. He also introduced Walters to museums and galleries and presented him to several prominent artists, including Antoine-Louis Barye, Pierre Édouard Frère, and Théophile Emmanuel Duverger. Walters spent much of the American Civil War in Europe, where he studied and acquired works of art.

After the end of the war, he returned to the United States, where he invested in banking and railroads, founding the Atlantic Coast Line. He was appointed as the United States commissioner at the Paris expositions of 1867 and 1878, and also to that of Vienna in 1873. In the late 1880s, he took in business in the horse trade, importing Percheron horses with his partner Samuel Hopkins.

In addition to contemporary European work, Walters began to collect Asian art and ceramics. His private collection became one of the largest and most valuable in the United States.

From 1874 onwards, Walters opened his house in Mount Vernon Place to the public most springs, with a 50 cent entrance fee; all proceeds went to charity. This annual exhibit of his gallery netted $30,000 for the poor of Baltimore.

Brayton Ives, a New York financier, made a well known collection of rare and historical swords. When he ceased collecting, the historical swords were sold, and through the efforts of Mr. Heber R. Bishop, William Thompson Walters and the American Art Association, the valuable sword collection, valued at $15,000, was donated to the Metropolitan Museum of Art.

At his death in 1894, Walters had bequeathed his estate, estimated at $10,000,000, to his children. His collection was left to his son Henry Walters, who had also been collecting art. He added to it greatly, and founded the Walters Gallery (now the Walters Art Museum) in Baltimore at Mount Vernon Square. He donated this to the city of Baltimore at his death in 1931 for the benefit of the public.

=== Personal life ===
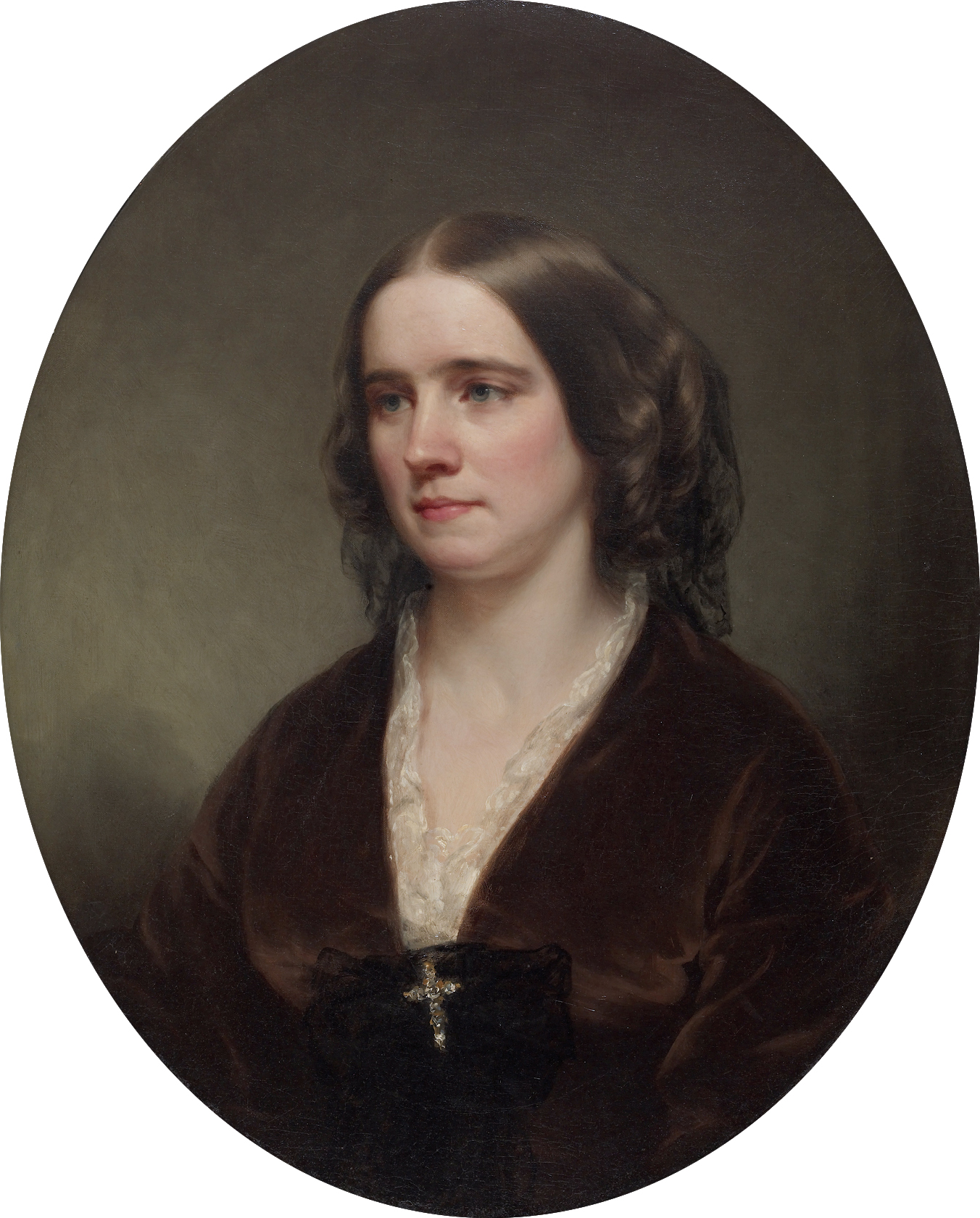
Ellen Harper Walters (George Augustus Baker, circa 1859)

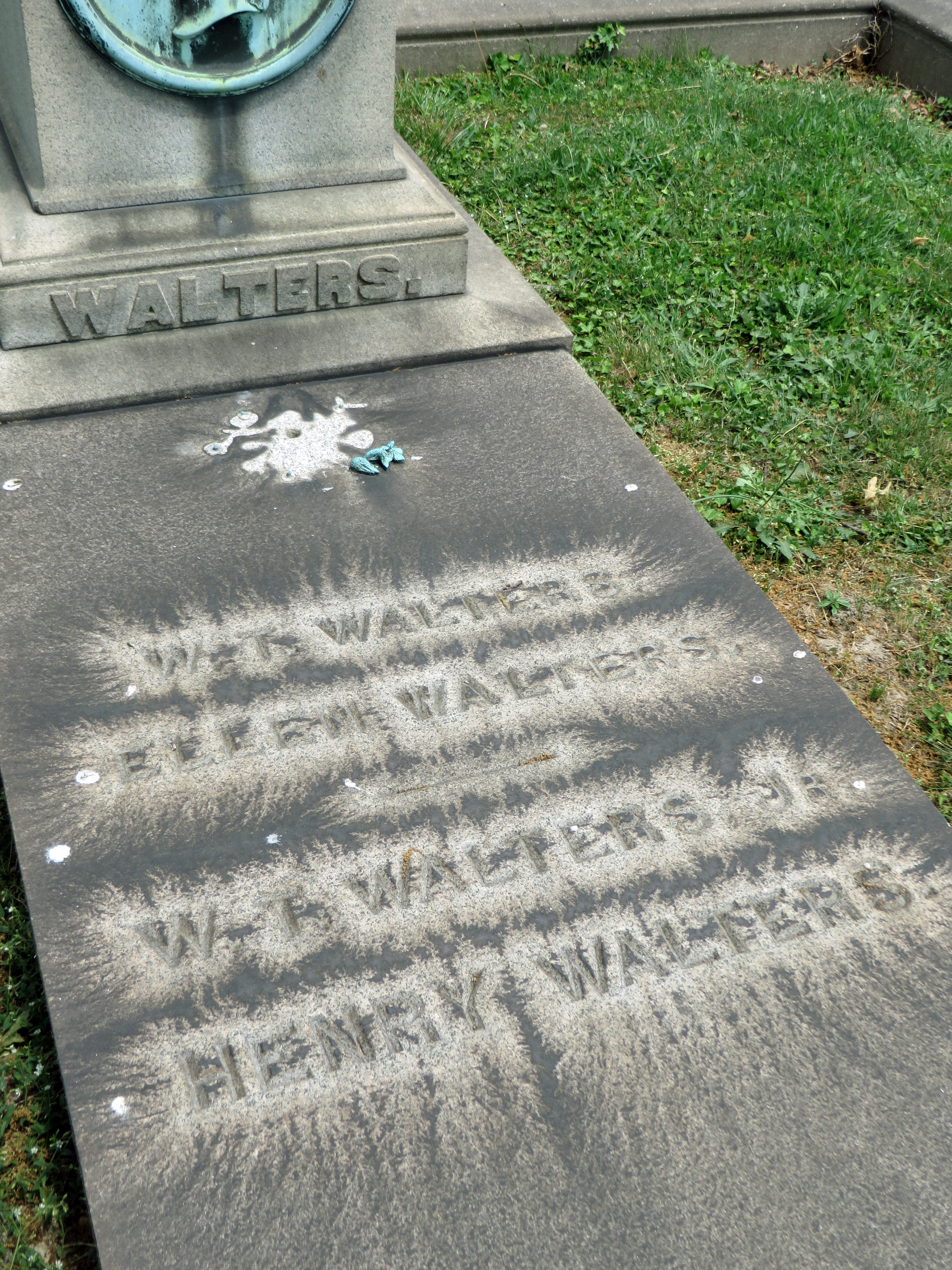
Gravestone detail

In 1846, Walters married Ellen Harper (1822–1862), daughter of a prosperous Philadelphia merchant. Together, they were the parents of two children that survived to adulthood, a son and daughter:

- Henry Walters (1848–1931), who married Sarah Wharton Green (1859–1943), the widow of Pembroke Jones, in 1922.
- Jennie Walters (1853–1922), who married Warren Delano (1852–1920), a son of Warren Delano Jr. and a brother of Frederic Adrian Delano and Sara Ann Delano Roosevelt, in 1876.

Ellen died young of pneumonia, contracted when they were traveling in England, in 1862. Walters lived another thirty-two years until his death on November 22, 1894, at his home on Mount Vernon Place in Baltimore. He was buried at Green Mount Cemetery, also in Baltimore.

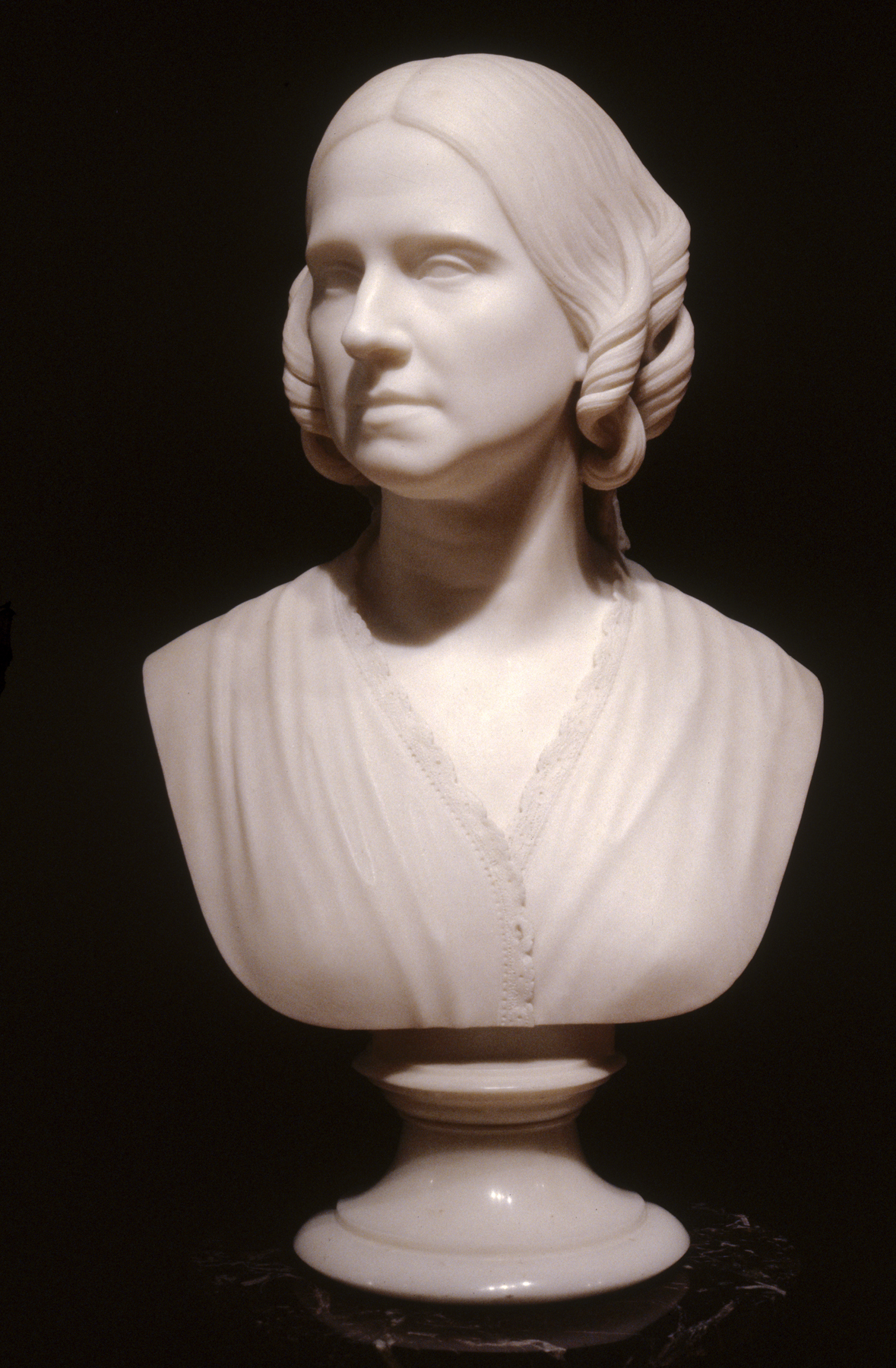
Bust by Rinehart of Walters' wife Ellen (Harper) Walters

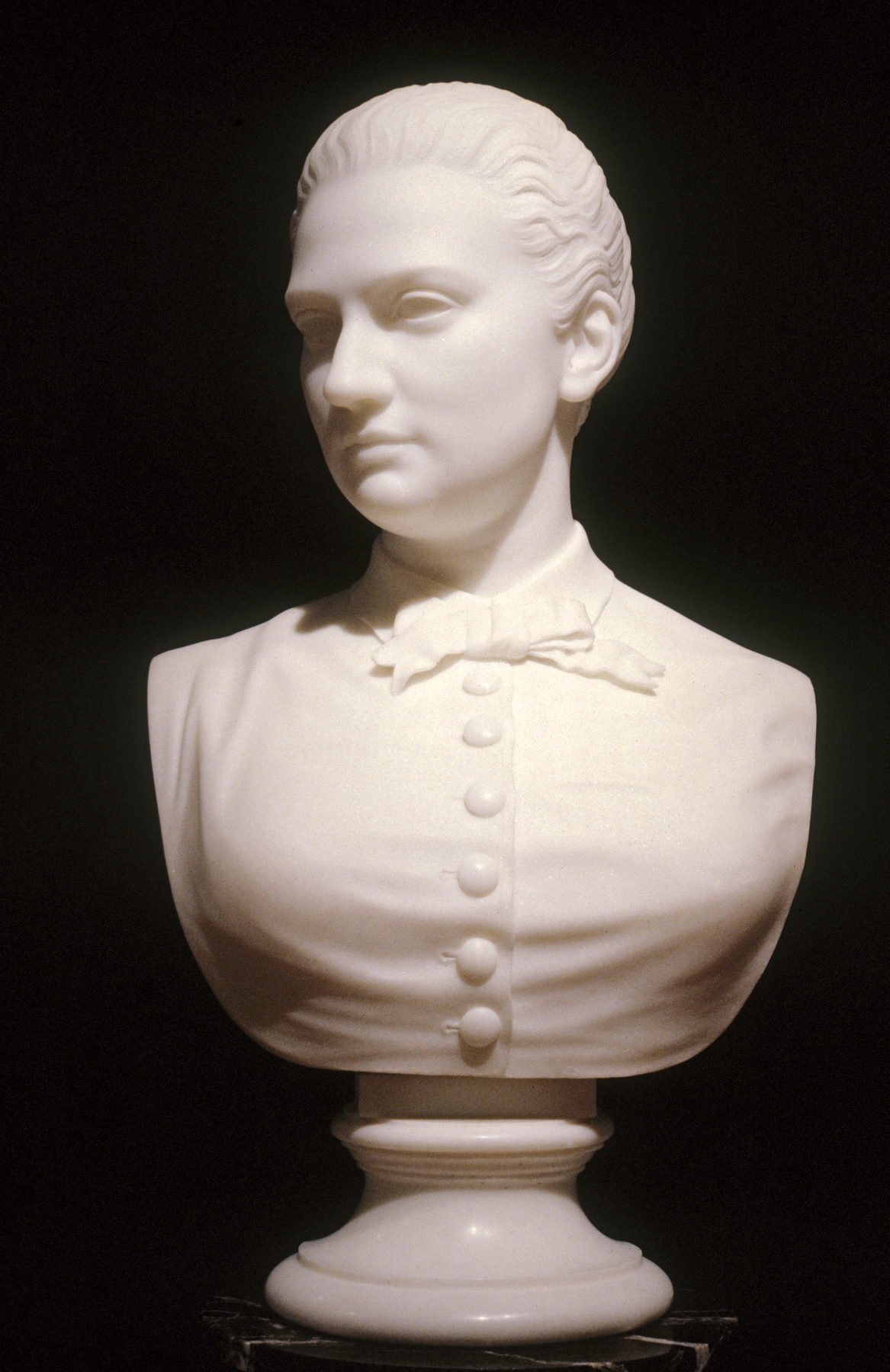
Bust by Rinehart of Jennie Walters, their daughter

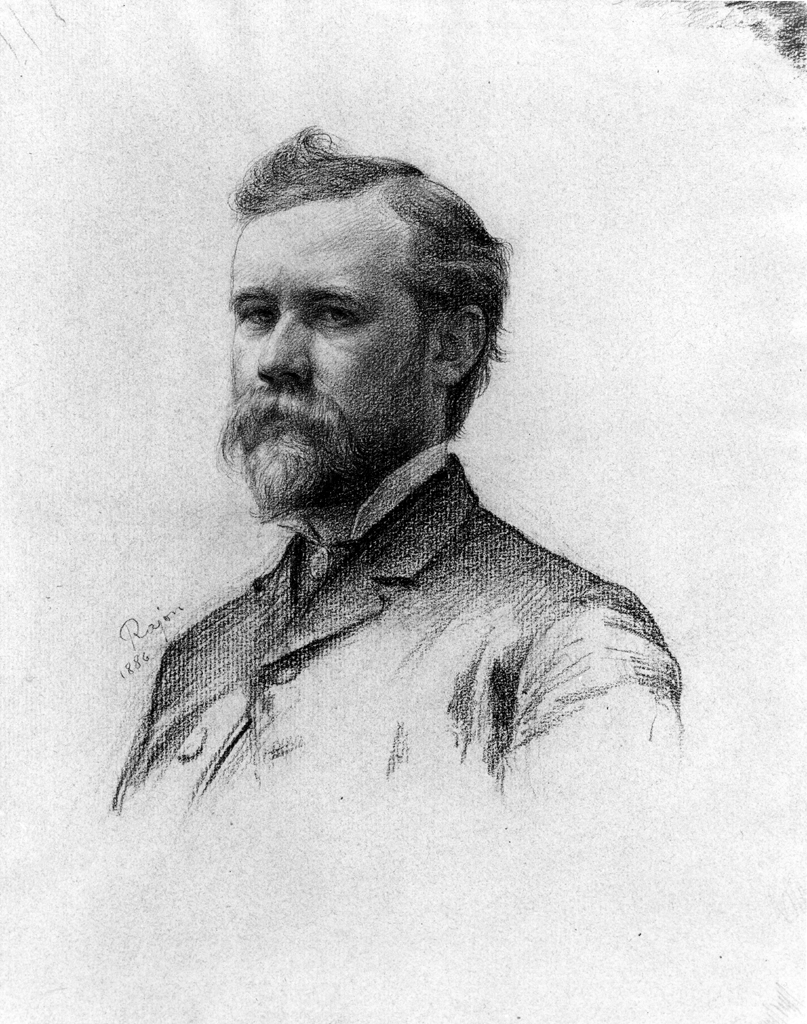
Portrait by Rajon of Henry Walters, their son

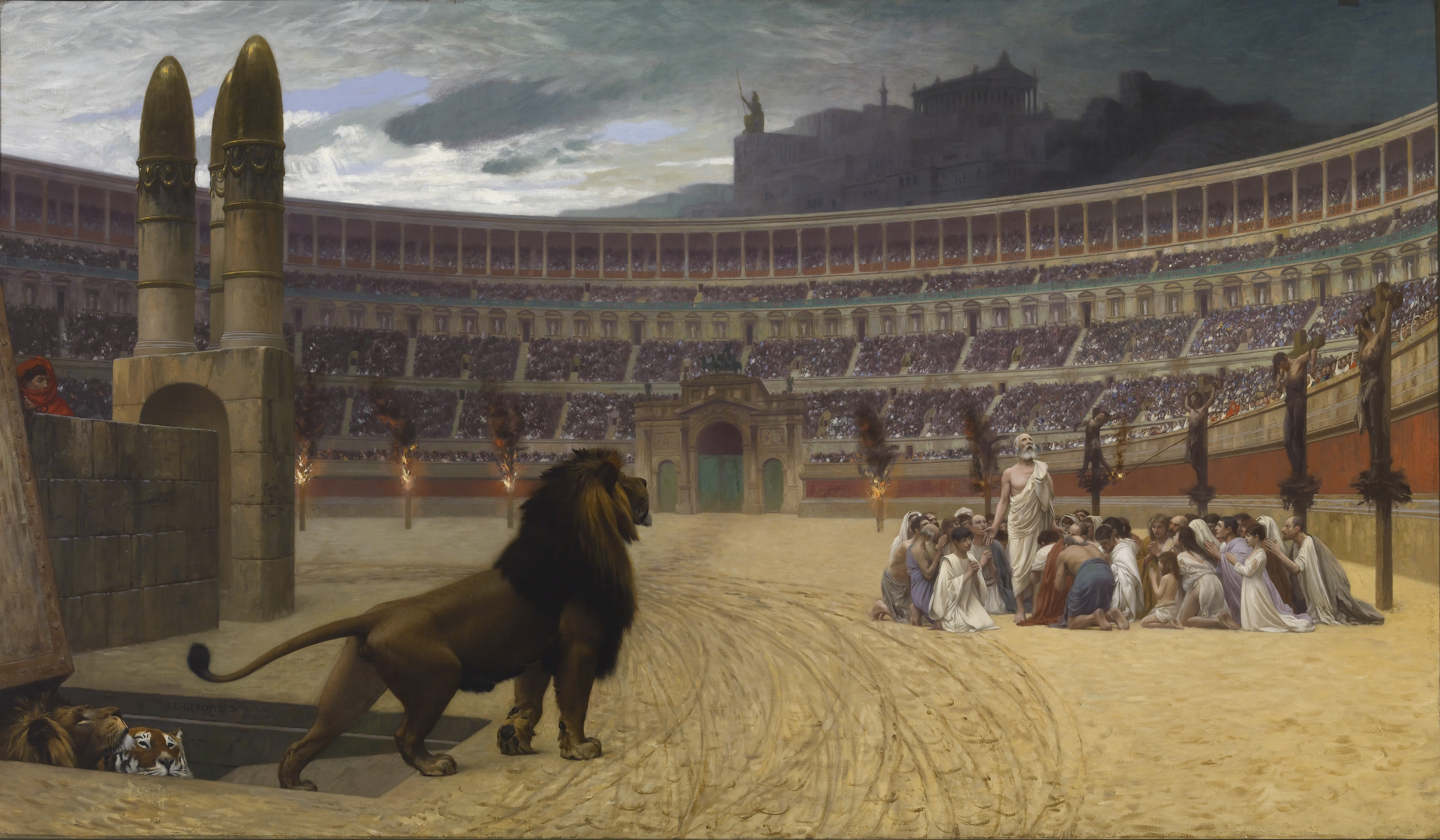
The Christian Martyrs' Last Prayer, 1883. Painting by Jean-Léon Gérôme, commissioned by Walters in 1863.

== Works ==
Among his writings are:

- Barye (1885)
- Notes Upon Certain Masters of the 19th Century (1886)
