= George Harold Edgell =

American arts historian (1887–1954)

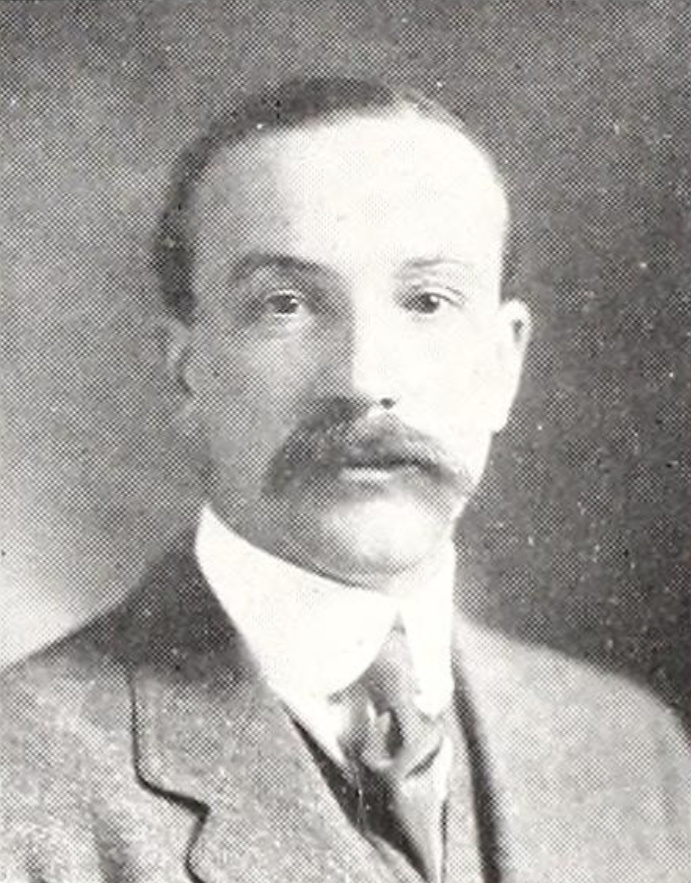
- Born: March 4, 1887; St. Louis, Missouri, US
- Died: June 29, 1954 (aged 67); Newport, New Hampshire, US
- Education: Cutler School; Harvard University, A.B. (1909), Ph.D. (1913)
- Spouse: Jean Walters Delano (m. 1914; died 1953)
- Relatives: Austin Corbin (grandfather); Warren Delano IV (father-in-law)
- Awards: Rome Prize
- Honours: Chevalier of the Order of the Legion of Honour

20th President of the American Association of Museums
- In office 1949–1951
- Preceded by: David E. Finley
- Succeeded by: Albert Eide Parr

5th Director of the Museum of Fine Arts, Boston
- In office 1935–1954
- Preceded by: Arthur Fairbanks
- Succeeded by: Perry T. Rathbone

Dean of the Harvard University School of Architecture
- In office 1922–1935
- Preceded by: Charles Wilson Killam (acting)
- Succeeded by: Joseph Hudnut (became the Graduate School of Design)

Signature
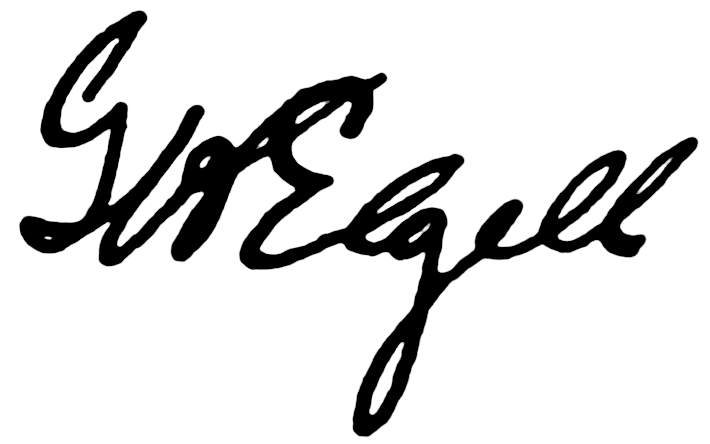

George Harold Edgell (March 4, 1887 – June 29, 1954) was a renowned American architectural and fine arts historian, author, and expert on Sienese paintings. He served as dean of the Harvard University School of Architecture and director of the Museum of Fine Arts in Boston, Massachusetts.

== Biography ==
George Harold Edgell was born on March 4, 1887, in St. Louis, Missouri, to George Stephen Edgell and Isabella Wallace Corbin. His maternal grandfather was Austin Corbin, a prominent American banking and railroad entrepreneur. Edgell prepared for college at the Cutler School in New York City and graduated magna cum laude from Harvard University in 1909 with a Bachelor of Arts. From 1910 to 1912, he was a fellow in Classical studies & archaeology at the American School of Classical Studies in Rome, where he was awarded the prestigious Rome Prize. Upon his return to the United States in 1913, Edgell became the first person to receive a Ph.D. in Fine Arts from Harvard University.

Edgell became an instructor in fine arts at Harvard, specializing in Italian Renaissance art, after returning from Italy. In 1913, he pioneered the first course in the United States on Central Italian painters. He was promoted to assistant professor in 1914, associate professor in 1922, and full professor in 1925. In 1922, Edgell was appointed dean of the Harvard School of Architecture, succeeding Charles Wilson Killam who was acting dean following the death of Harold Langford Warren. In 1935, Edgell resigned from his professorship at Harvard to become curator of paintings at the Boston Museum of Fine Arts, a position he held until 1939. Additionally, he was named director of the museum in 1935, a role he held until his death in 1954.

In addition to his academic career at Harvard, Edgell held various prestigious roles. He was a lecturer at the Archaeological Institute of America from 1916 to 1917 and at the Lowell Institute in 1921. He was annual professor to the American Academy in Rome from 1919 to 1920 and exchange professor to the University of Paris in 1929. He was member of the Boston Art Commission from 1925 to 1954, a trustee of the Boston Museum of Fine Arts from 1927 to 1954, and served as chairman of the Massachusetts State Art Commission from 1941 to 1954. He was member of the U.S. Commission for UNE from 1947 to 1954UNESCO.

During the period of U.S. participation in World War I, Edgell was requested by the Federal Committee on Public Information to represent the United States as American commissioner of the Commissione Centrale Interalleate per Propaganda, a commission attached to the general headquarters of the Italian Army at Padua. In 1937 he was made chevalier of the French Legion of Honour. Harvard awarded him with an honorary Art.D. degree in 1948.

As a hobby, Edgell hunted wild bees and published The Bee Hunter in 1949. This publication was intended for friends and family, but was widely publicized both nationally and internationally. In addition, from 1915 to 1917, Edgell was associate editor of Art and Archaeology and was elected a fellow of both the American Association for the Advancement of Science and the American Academy of Arts and Sciences. He was a member of the Archaeological Institute of America, College Arts Association of America, American Institute of Architects, American Association of Museums (president from 1949 to 1951), Boston Society of Architects, Phi Beta Kappa, the Harvard and Tavern clubs of Boston, the Century Association and the Harvard Club of New York City, and The Athenaeum Club of London. He was also a member of the Rhode Island Historical Society.

== Family and death ==
On June 13, 1914, in Barrytown, New York, Edgell married Jean Walters Delano, daughter of Warren Delano IV. They had three children: George Harold Edgell Jr., Delano Edgell, and Henry Walters Edgell. George Harold Edgell died in Newport, New Hampshire on June 29, 1954, following a brief illness. He was buried in North Newport Cemetery.

== Works ==
- 1918 – A History of Architecture with Fiske Kimball
- 1928 – The American Architecture of To-Day
- 1932 – A History of Sienese Painting
- 1949 – The Bee Hunter
