= George A. Lucas =

Art dealer

George Aloysius Lucas
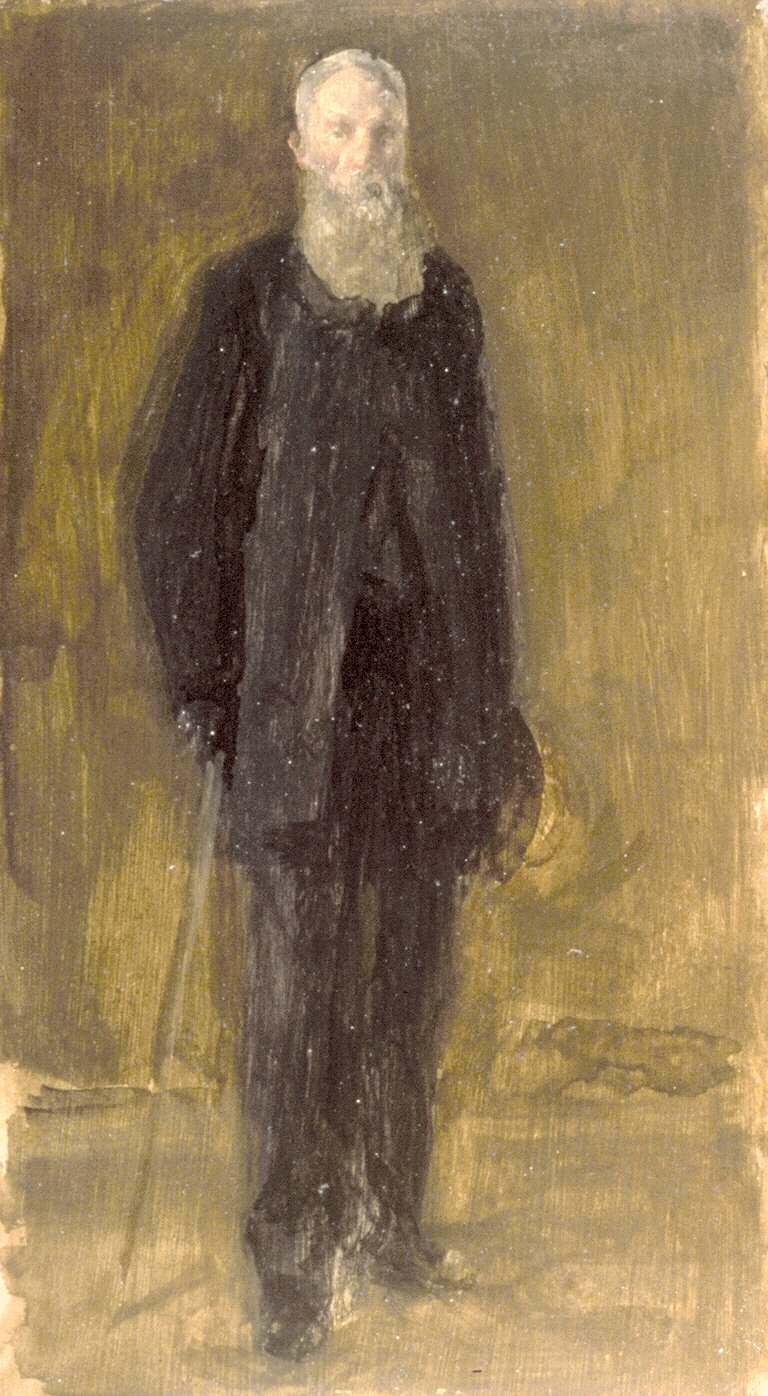
- James McNeill Whistler, Portrait of George A. Lucas, 1886, oil on canvas, The Walters Art Museum.
- Born: George Aloysius Lucas; May 29, 1824; Baltimore
- Died: December 17, 1909 (aged 85); Paris
- Occupation: Art dealer

George Aloysius Lucas (1824–1909) was an American-born art dealer living in Paris in the late nineteenth and early twentieth centuries.

== Early years ==
George A. Lucas, an art collector and agent for American patrons, was born in Baltimore in 1824 as the seventh son of Fielding Lucas Jr., who owned a publishing and stationery company. He attended United States Military Academy at West Point and after graduating in 1845, began working as a civil engineer on railroads in New Jersey. Lucas moved to New York in 1853 and began buying works for his Baltimore friends.

== Work ==
Following the death of his father and older brother, Lucas returned to Baltimore in 1856, only to move to Paris a year later. He lived there on an annuity from his father's estate and worked as an agent for art collectors and dealers in the United States such as Samuel Putnam Avery, John Taylor Johnston, Cyrus Lawrence, William Henry Vanderbilt, and Henry Field. He is perhaps most recognized for helping to build the collection of William Thompson Walters, for whom he purchased pieces by Honoré Daumier, Léon Gérôme, Jean-Baptiste-Camille Corot, Antoine-Louis Barye, Théodore Rousseau, and Paul Delaroche. Lucas' responsibilities as an art dealer for these American business men also included overseeing commissions on their behalf, shipping out food packages, acting as a Parisian tour guide, and hosting dinner parties.

While Lucas had a rapport with many French artists, James Abbott McNeill Whistler and Lucas shared a personal as well as professional relationship. Lucas helped arrange numerous exhibits of Whistler's work in Paris, and Whistler painted Lucas' portrait in 1886, which was given to Henry Walters in 1908. Frequently, Lucas stayed at his friend's country estate house, and the two men regularly corresponded from 1862 to 1886. The friendship came to an end in 1886 when Whistler left Maud Franklin for Beatrix Godwin, whom he married in 1888. Lucas took the side of Franklin and helped her settle in Paris.

== Life in Paris ==
Unlike most of his clients, Lucas had a modest lifestyle. He also paid for the apartment of his long-term mistress Josephine Marchand and her servants; however, their relationship was discreet according to the expert Lilian Randall, who translated and decoded Lucas' diary. Until the 1906 visit of his niece Bertha, Lucas had not seen any member of his family since becoming an expatriate, yet he remained in touch with his family and friends in America through correspondence. As he aged, he became more nostalgic about Baltimore, where he ultimately bequeathed his collection.

== Collection ==
Lucas had a substantial collection, with a large number or prints by Eugène Delacroix, Édouard Manet, Mary Cassatt, and James Abbott McNeill Whistler. At his death, he owned 19,000 prints, 300 paintings, and 170 bronze sculptures. Two months before his death, Lucas bequeathed his art to Henry Walters with the understanding that it would ultimately go to the Maryland Institute for the Promotion of the Mechanic Arts (MICA), which had been destroyed in the Great Baltimore Fire of 1904. In 1933, most of the art was transferred to the Baltimore Museum of Art on indefinite loan and now forms part of the permanent collections of the Baltimore Museum of Art and the Walters Art Museum. Thus, an uproar erupted within the Baltimore art community in 1995 when MICA threatened to sell their portion of Lucas' collection for resources to better fit their mission. Many scholars, who especially appreciate Lucas' prints because they offer a comprehensive view of nineteenth-century graphic art, had enjoyed the convenience of the entire collection being housed in a single city.

== External References ==
- "George A. Lucas" Baltimore Museum of Art.
- “The Night Patrol at Smyrna Alexandre-Gabriel Decamps (French, Paris 1803–1860 Fontainebleau) The Metropolitan Museum of Art
- "Randall, Lilian M[aria] C[harlotte] née Cramer". Dictionary of Art Historians.
- "No Day without a Line, Whistler in the Archives of American Art", October 10, 2003 – January 9, 2004.
- The Baltimore Museum of Art. Annual 1 The Museum: Its First Half Century (Baltimore, Maryland: The Baltimore Museum of Art, 1966), 18.
- "A Century of Baltimore Collecting 1840–1940: An Exhibition at the Baltimore Museum of Art June 6 – September 1, 1941."
