= Liberian Development Chartered Company =

The Mining Company of Liberia was possibly the first mining company in Liberia. This company was founded by Liberians, after the return of the Liberian explorer Benjamin J.K. Anderson from the interior in 1869, and was granted a concession in the same year, during the (first) administration of President James Spriggs Payne and only a few years after the formal establishment of a ‘closed door policy' by the introduction of the 'Ports of Entry Act'.

In 1881 the company was transformed into the 'Union Mining Company' but information on it is scarce. It is known that it was an English-owned company, which operated in conjunction with sixteen Liberians, among whom there were several Government officials.

The company’s mining rights were in 1901 transferred to the 'West African Gold Concessions, Inc.' which is in fact the first real indication that gold and not, for instance, diamonds were involved. Between 1902 and 1904, the company chartered six expeditions to search the hinterlands for minerals.

The company name was changed later to that of the 'Liberian Development Chartered Company'.

== Sources ==
- Sir Harry Johnston, 'Liberia', 1906
