= Warren Delano Jr. =

Opium merchant; Maternal grandfather of Franklin Roosevelt

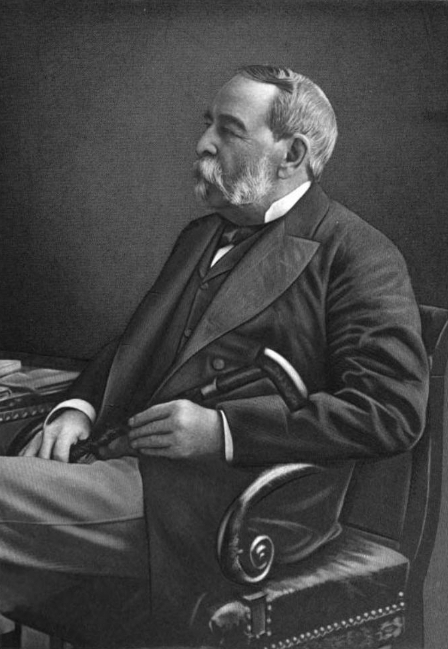
- Born: July 13, 1809; New Bedford, Massachusetts, U.S.
- Died: January 17, 1898 (aged 88); Newburgh, New York, U.S.
- Occupation: Merchant
- Employer: Russell & Company
- Spouse: Catherine Robbins Lyman (m. 1843; died 1896)
- Children: Susan; Louisa; Maria; Anne; Warren III; Warren IV; Sara; Philippe; Katherine; Frederic; Laura
- Relatives: Delano family

Warren Delano Jr. (July 13, 1809 – January 17, 1898) was an American merchant and drug smuggler who made a large fortune smuggling opium into China. He was the maternal grandfather of U.S. President Franklin Delano Roosevelt.

== Early life ==
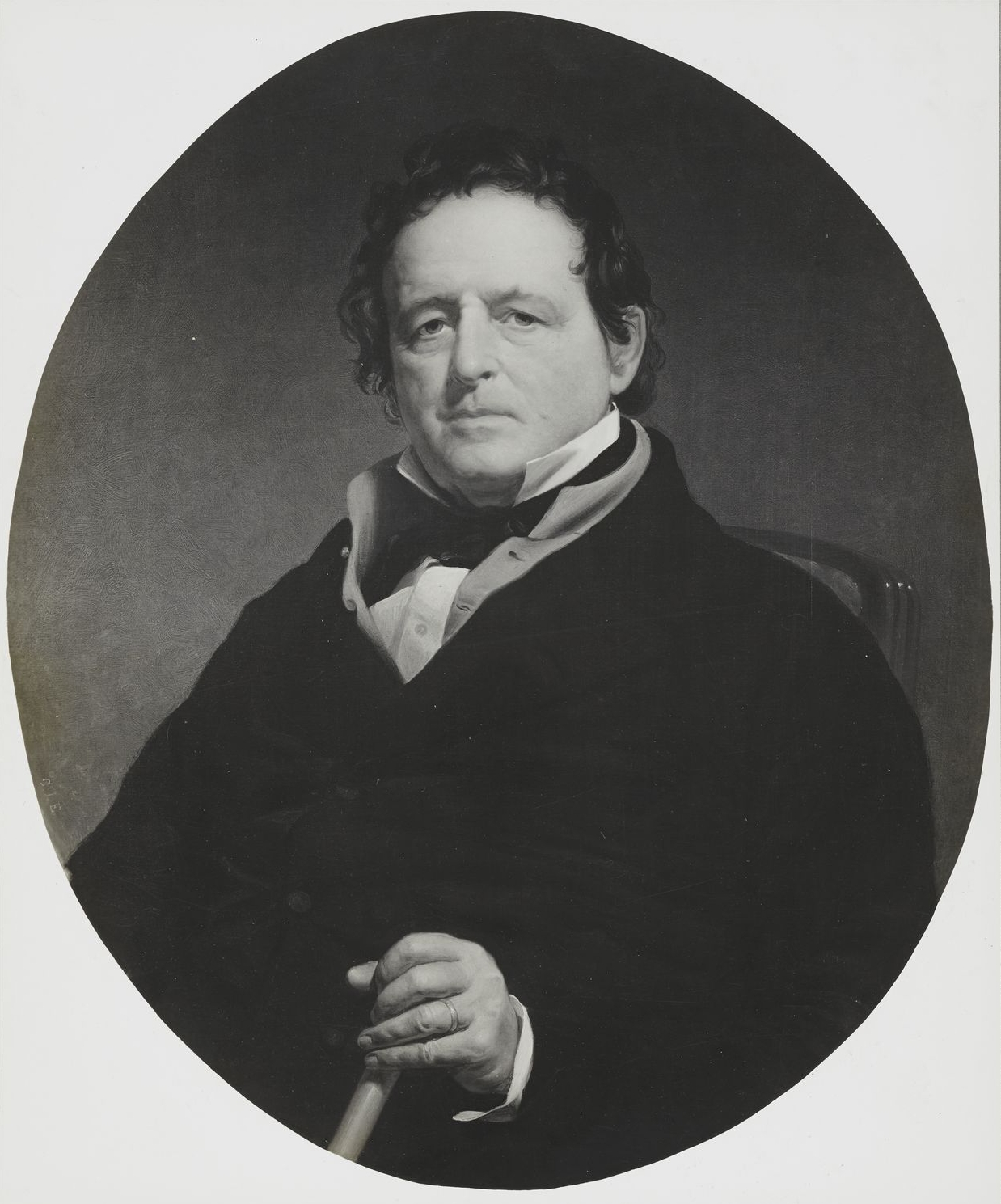
Delano's father, Capt. Warren Delano

Delano was born on July 13, 1809, in New Bedford, Massachusetts. He was the eldest son of Captain Warren Delano Sr. (1779–1866) and Deborah Perry (née Church) Delano.

After his mother's death in 1827, his father, who was involved in the New England sea trade, remarried to Elizabeth Adams, a widow of Captain Parker of the United States Navy. Among his siblings were brothers Frederick Delano, Edward Delano and Franklin Hughes Delano, who was married to Laura Astor, a daughter of William Backhouse Astor Sr. and a sister of, among others, John Jacob Astor III and William Backhouse Astor Jr. (Note: Reportedly, Laura Astor Delano was the favorite granddaughter of John Jacob Astor, the founding Astor family patriarch who was America's first millionaire. As they had no children, Laura and Franklin's 1851 home, Steen Valetje, was inherited by Warren Jr.'s son, Warren Delano IV.)

A descendant of Philip Delano (a Pilgrim who arrived in Plymouth, Massachusetts, in 1621), Warren Jr.'s paternal grandparents were Ephraim Delano and Elisabeth (née Cushman) Delano, and his maternal grandparents were Joseph Church and Deborah (née Perry) Church.

He graduated from the Fairhaven Academy at the age of 15 and by age 17 was a trader in the import business.

== Career ==
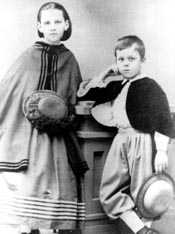
Delano's daughter Sara and son Philippe in 1865 after returning from Hong Kong

Delano made a large fortune smuggling opium into Canton (now Guangzhou), China. Opium, a highly addictive narcotic (which pharmacists later found can be refined into heroin), was illegal in China.

By the 1800s, there was an immense European demand for Chinese luxury products such as silk, tea, porcelain ("china"), and furniture, but Chinese demand for European products was much less.

As a result, many European nations ran large trade deficits with China. Foreign traders such as the Scottish merchant William Jardine of Jardine Matheson introduced large-scale opium smuggling into China as merchandise to pay for coveted Chinese products. The vast illegal opium trade resulted in millions of Chinese becoming addicted, and in a drastic reversal of the trade imbalance to favor Europe. This led to the First Opium War of 1840–1843.

Delano first went to China at age 24, before the Opium War, to work for Russell & Company, which had pioneered the China trade. Earlier, John Perkins Cushing – also a Russell & Company partner – had worked with the largest Chinese hong merchant, Howqua, to establish an offshore base. At this anchored floating warehouse, Russell & Company ships would offload their opium contraband, then continue with their legal cargo up the Pearl River Delta to Canton.

By early 1843, Delano had prospered greatly in the Chinese opium trade, rising to become the head partner of the biggest American firm trading with China. He had witnessed the destruction of the Canton trading concession system, the humiliation of the Chinese government, and the creation of New China.

In the 1850s, Delano, along with his brother Franklin and Asa Packer, builder of the Lehigh Valley Railroad and founder of Lehigh University, headed a land company that purchased several thousand acres and established the town of Delano, Pennsylvania.

Delano lost much of his fortune in the Panic of 1857. In 1860, he returned to China, except this time to Hong Kong, where he rebuilt his fortune. During the U.S. Civil War, Delano shipped opium to the Medical Bureau of the U.S. War Department.

== Personal life ==
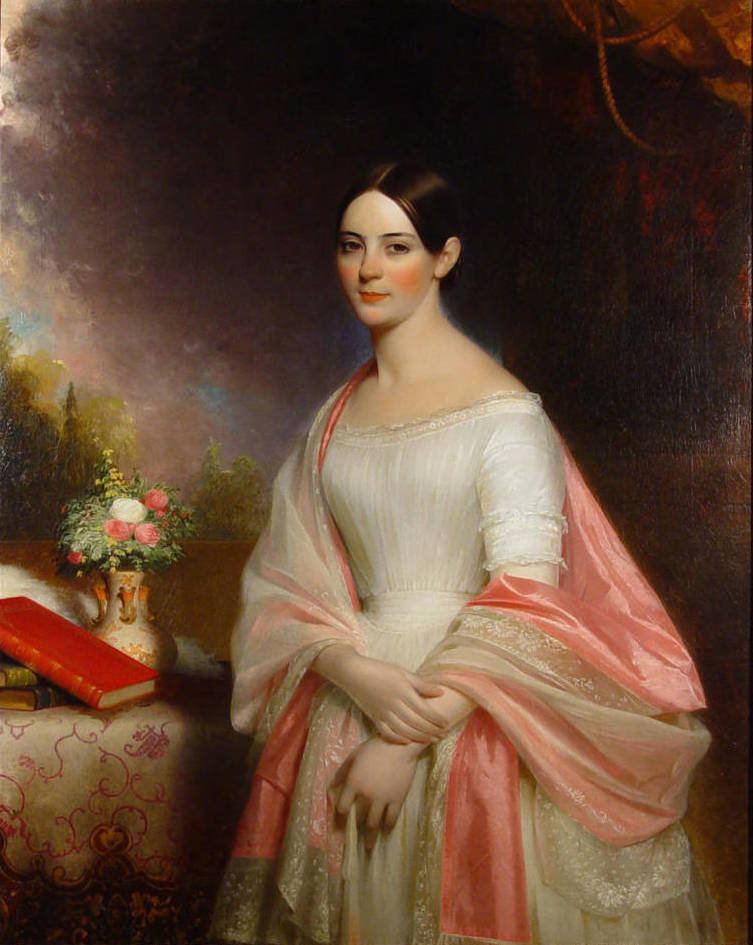
Catherine Robbins Lyman Delano

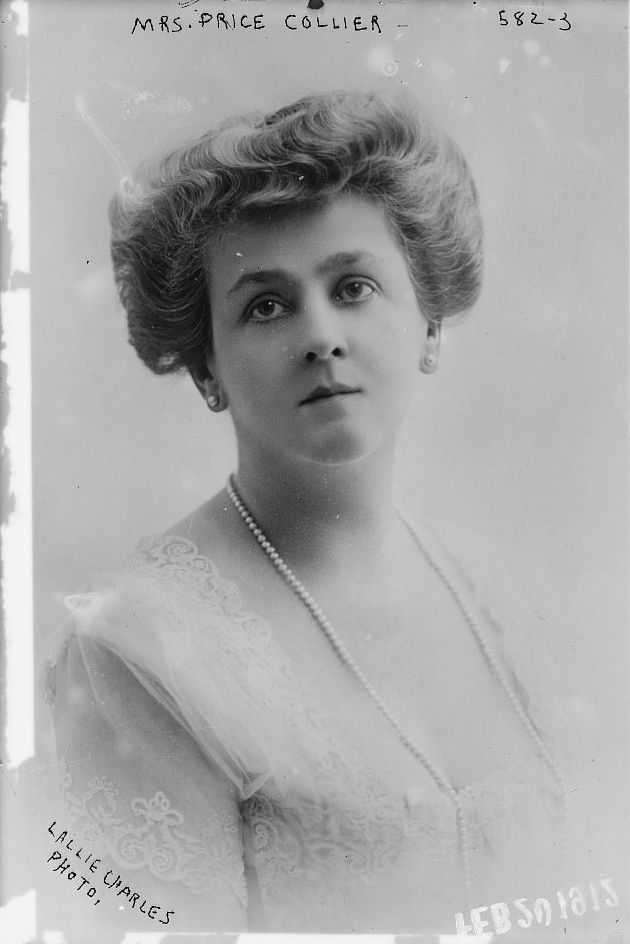
A 1910 portrait of Delano's daughter, Katherine Robbins Collier, by Lallie Charles

On November 1, 1843, Delano was married to Catherine Robbins Lyman (1825–1896), a daughter of Joseph Lyman and Anne Jean (née Robbins) Lyman, during a short visit to Massachusetts. She was a granddaughter of politician Edward Hutchinson Robbins. Together, they were the parents of eleven children:

1. Susan Maria Delano (1844–1846), who died in infancy.
2. Louisa Church Delano (1846–1869), who died young and unmarried.
3. Deborah Perry Delano (1847–1940), who married merchant William Howell Forbes of the Forbes family. After William died in 1896, she married his brother Paul Revere Forbes in 1903.
4. Anne Lyman Delano (1849–1926), who married merchant Frederic Delano Hitch in 1877.
5. Warren Delano III (1850–1851), who died in infancy.
6. Warren Delano IV (1852–1920), who married Jennie Walters, the only daughter of merchant William Thompson Walters.
7. Sara Ann Delano (1854–1941), who married James Roosevelt I and became the mother of President Franklin Delano Roosevelt.
8. Philippe Delano (1857–1881), who died young and unmarried.
9. Katherine Robbins Delano (1860–1953), who married Charles Albert Robbins in 1882. After his death in 1889, she married Hiram Price Collier, a Unitarian minister.
10. Frederic Adrian Delano (1863–1953), who married Matilda Anne Peasley and served as president of the Monon Railroad.
11. Laura Franklin Delano (1864–1884), who died young and unmarried.

In 1851, Delano bought 60 acres on the Hudson River in Balmville, New York (two miles north of Newburgh). He commissioned Andrew Jackson Downing and Calvert Vaux to remodel an existing farmhouse into an Italianate villa, naming it Algonac.

== Death and burial ==
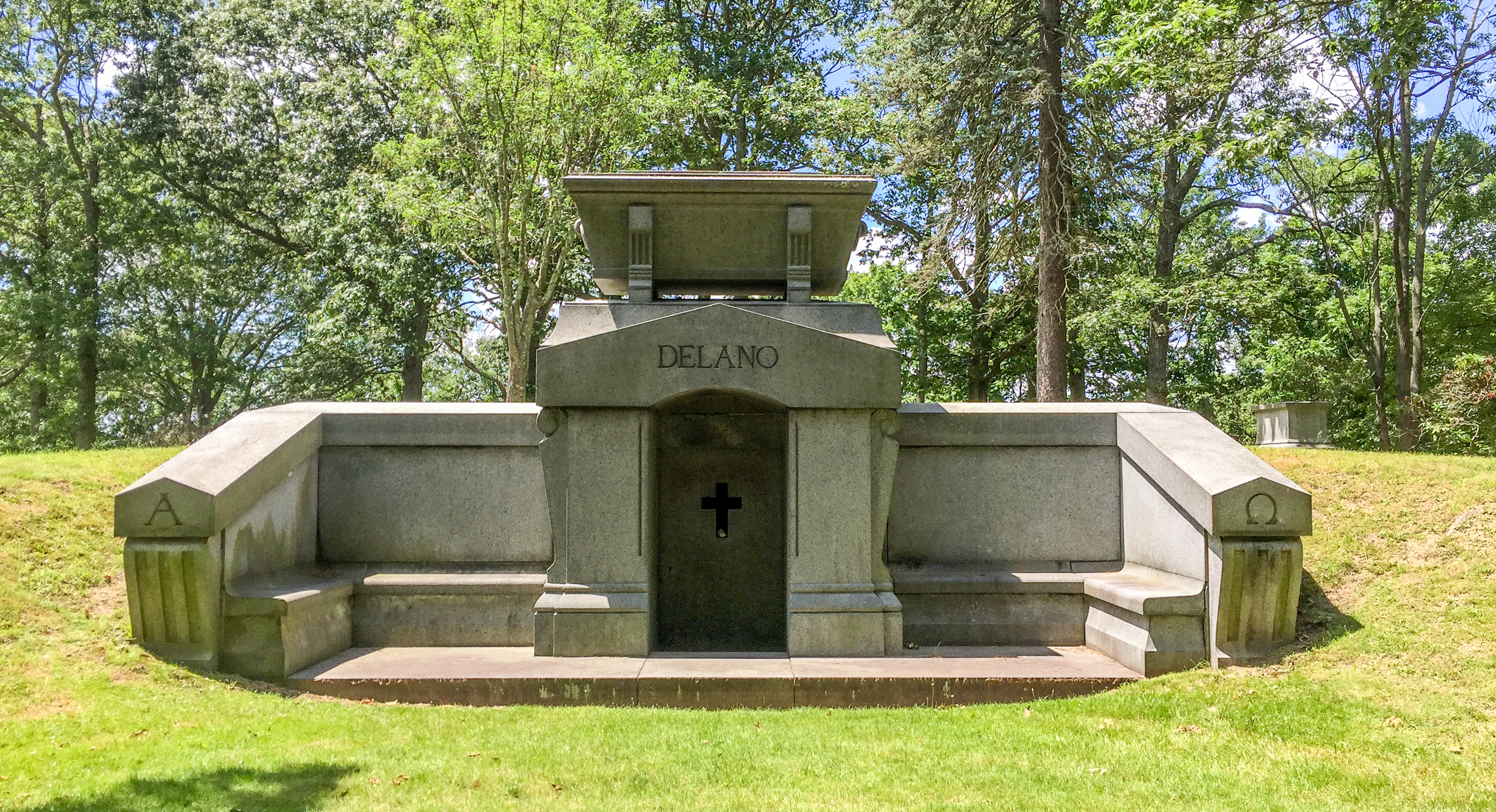
The Delano family tomb at Riverside Cemetery in Fairhaven, Massachusetts

His wife Catherine died on February 10, 1896, in Newburgh, New York. Delano died in Algonac on January 17, 1898, of bronchial pneumonia. After a funeral there, he was buried next to his wife in the Delano Family Tomb at Riverside Cemetery in Fairhaven, Massachusetts, which Delano had established in 1850. The tomb was erected in 1859 and designed by Richard Morris Hunt.

=== Descendants ===
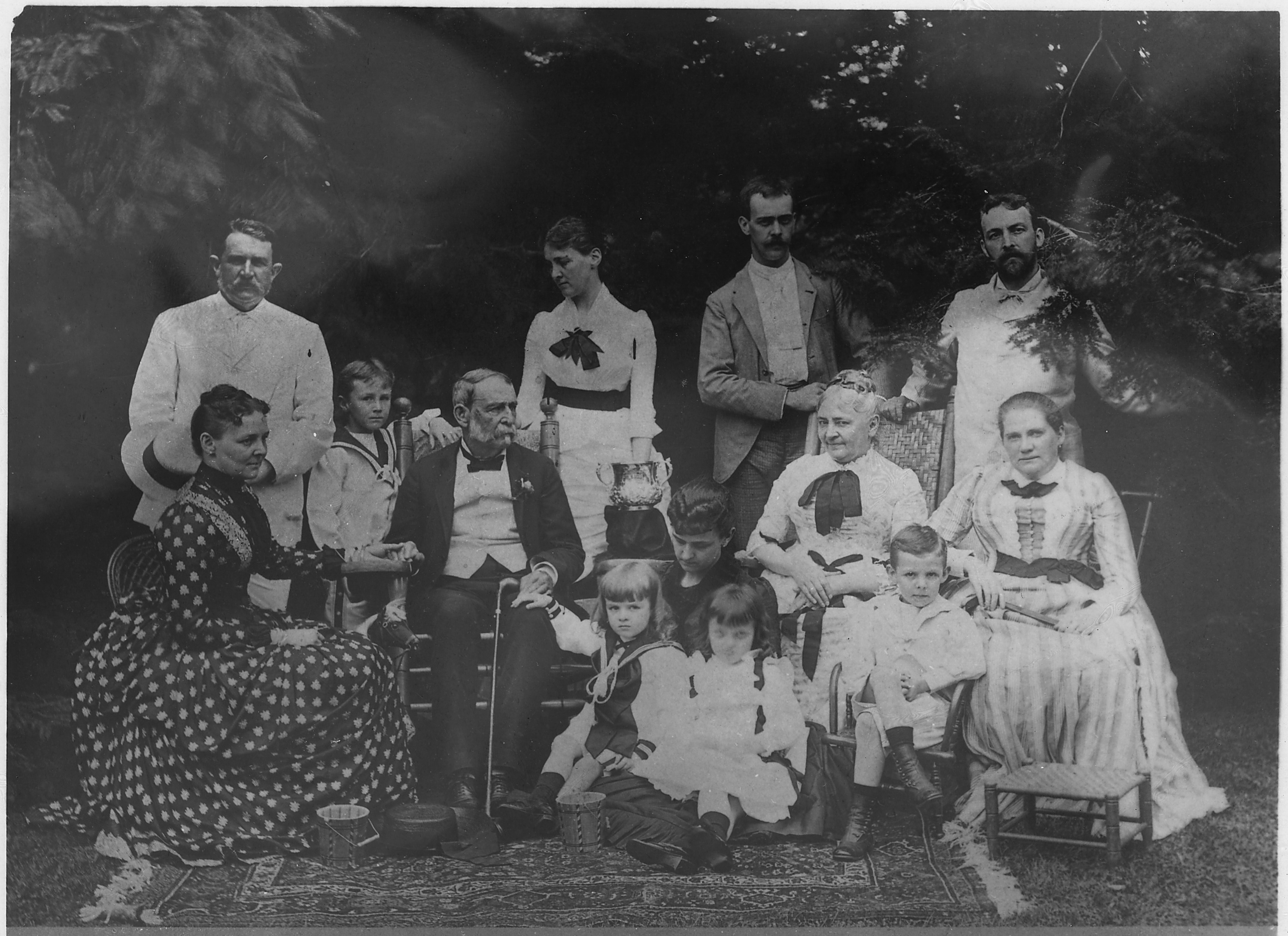
The Delano family in an 1889 family portrait at Algonac

Through his daughter Sara, he was a grandfather of the 32nd President of the United States Franklin Delano Roosevelt, who married his fifth cousin, Eleanor Roosevelt, and was the father of six children, Anna Eleanor Roosevelt, James Roosevelt II, Franklin Roosevelt (who died in infancy), Elliott Roosevelt, Franklin D. Roosevelt Jr., and John Aspinwall Roosevelt II.

Through his daughter Katherine, he was a grandfather of four, including diplomat Warren Delano Robbins and Katharine Price Collier, a Republican U.S. Representative who in 1917 married George St. George, third son of the second Sir Richard St George, 2nd Baronet.

=== Legacy ===
Both Delano, Pennsylvania, and Delano Township, Pennsylvania, were named for Warren Delano Jr.
