= Frederic Adrian Delano =

American businessman (1863–1953)

Frederic Delano
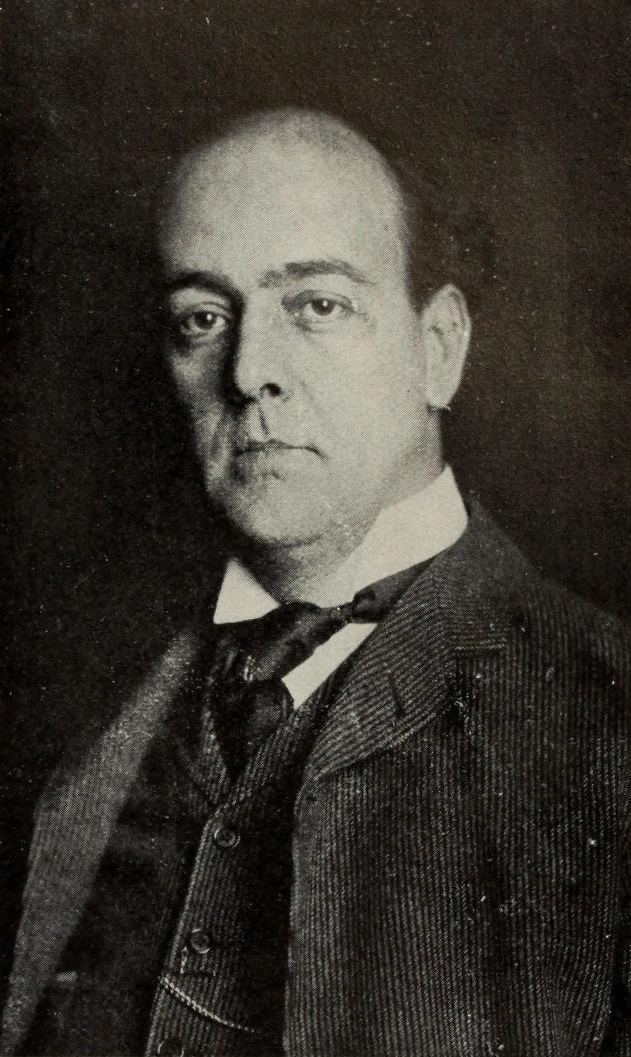
- Delano in 1914

1st Vice Chairman of the Federal Reserve
- In office August 10, 1914 – August 9, 1916
- President: Woodrow Wilson
- Preceded by: Position established
- Succeeded by: Paul Warburg

Member of the Federal Reserve Board
- In office August 10, 1914 – July 21, 1918
- President: Woodrow Wilson
- Preceded by: Position established
- Succeeded by: Henry A. Moehlenpah

President of Monon Railroad
- In office 1913–1914
- Preceded by: Fairfax Harrison
- Succeeded by: Harry Kurrie

Personal details
- Born: Frederic Adrian Delano II; September 10, 1863 Hong Kong
- Died: March 28, 1953 (aged 89) Boston, Massachusetts, U.S.
- Party: Democratic
- Children: 5
- Relatives: Warren Delano Jr. (Father); Sara Ann Delano (Sister); Warren Delano IV (Brother); Franklin D. Roosevelt (Nephew)
- Education: Harvard University (BA)

Frederic Adrian Delano II (September 10, 1863 – March 28, 1953) was an American railroad president who served as the first vice chairman of the Federal Reserve from 1914 to 1916. After his term as vice chairman, Delano continued to serve as a member of the Federal Reserve Board until 1918.

== Early life ==
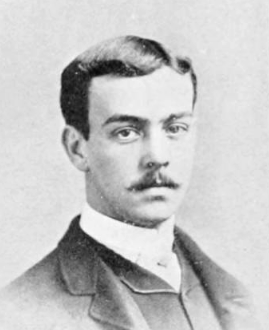
At Harvard, c. 1885

Delano was born in Hong Kong on September 10, 1863. He was a member of the Delano family as a son of Warren Delano Jr. and Catherine Robbins Lyman. He was a brother of Warren Delano IV and Sara Ann Delano, and uncle of U.S. President Franklin Delano Roosevelt.

Like his older brother Warren, he graduated from Harvard University in 1885.

== Career ==
After his graduation from Harvard, Delano was employed by the Chicago, Burlington, and Quincy Railroad in various capacities, rising from the position of civil engineer to be general manager at Chicago. For a time he was consulting engineer to the United States War Department in respect to the railroads of the Philippine Islands. In 1905, he became president of the Wheeling and Lake Erie Railroad, of the Wabash Pittsburgh Terminal Railway, and of the Wabash Railroad. Delano was appointed one of the receivers for the Wabash in 1911, and in 1913, he was elected president of the Monon Railroad (succeeding Fairfax Harrison). He was vice president of the American Unitarian Association in 1907.

His addresses were published under the titles Questions of the Hour (1911) and Are Our Railroads Fairly Treated? (1913). He was also the chairman of the influential National Capital Park and Planning Commission and helped approve and oversee the building of the Pentagon. He held an informal role as an advisor during his nephew's presidency, particularly on issues of land conservation and regional planning.

== Legacy ==
His philanthropic work through the Commercial Club of Chicago, which has been said to have strongly impacted his nephew's presidential policies. Delano was Chairman of the Committee on the Regional Plan for New York and Its Environs, which released the regional plan for New York on May 27, 1929.

He was also a member of the Commercial Club of Chicago which affected the development of Chicago in the 19th and 20th centuries. Delano was the first vice-chairman of the Federal Reserve and the National Resources Planning Board.

His house on 2244 S Street NW in the Kalorama neighborhood of Washington DC, designed by Waddy Butler Wood in 1924, survives as the Residence of the Irish Ambassador.

== Personal life ==
In 1888, Frederic was married to Matilda Anne Peasley (1867–1953). Together, they were the parents of five children, all daughters, including:

- Catherine Lyman Delano (1889–1951), who married Alexander Galt Grant.
- Louise Delano (1891–1923), who married Sherwood Cheney (1873–1949), Commandant of the U.S. Army Engineer School.
- Laura Delano (1893–1978), who married James Lawrence Houghteling (1883–1962). His sister Josephine Houghteling was married to financier Frank Gray Griswold.
- Matilda Delano (1899–1911), who died young.
- Alice Delano (1903–1904), who died young.

Delano died in Newburgh, New York on March 28, 1953.

Government offices
New office	Member of the Federal Reserve Board; 1914–1918	Succeeded by Henry A. Moehlenpah
New office	Vice Chair of the Federal Reserve; 1914–1916	Succeeded by Paul M. Warburg
