= Little Catawissa Creek =

Tributary of Catawissa Creek, Pennsylvania

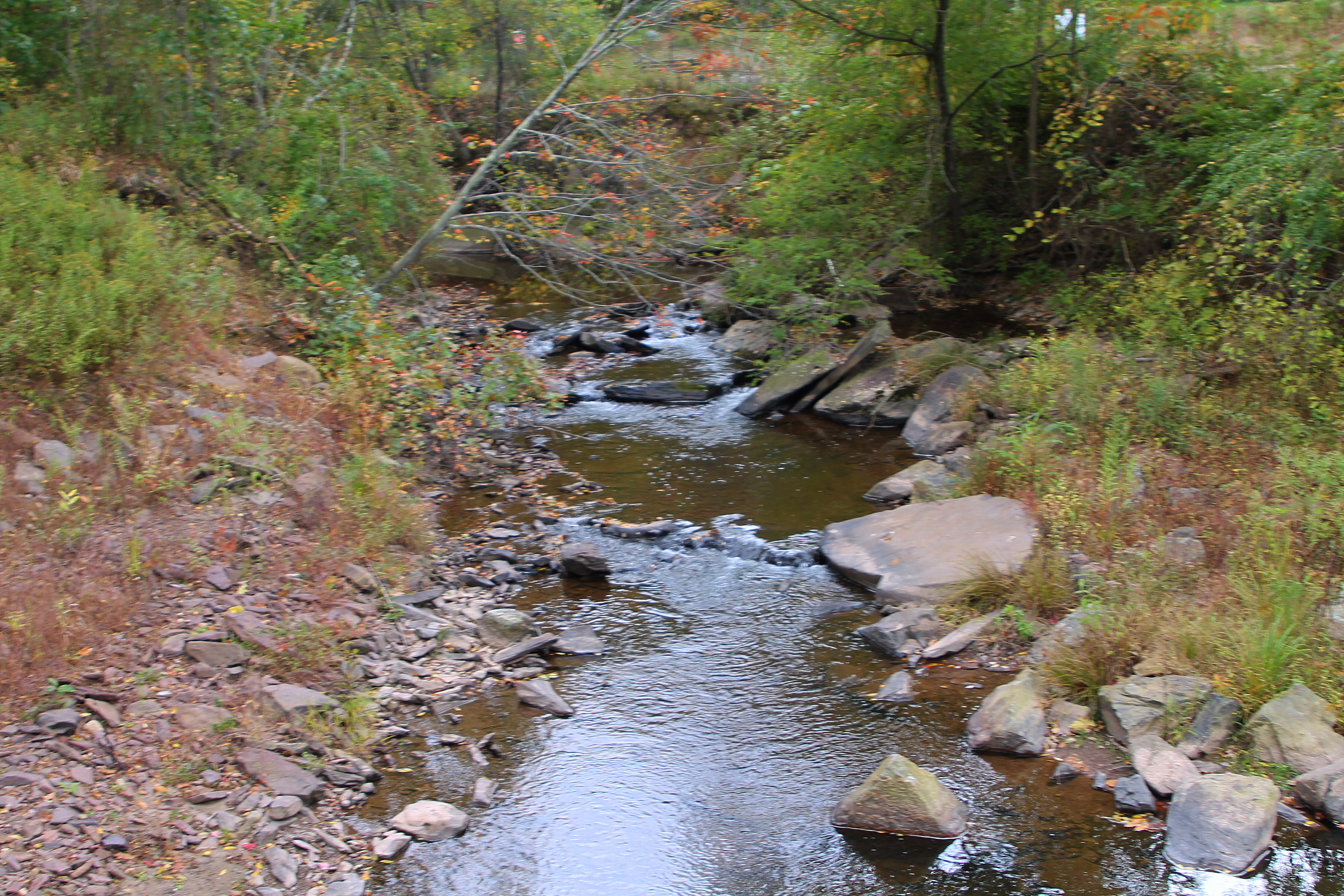
- Little Catawissa Creek looking upstream immediately above the mouth of the tributary Stony Run
- Etymology: the fact that Little Catawissa Creek is smaller than Catawissa Creek

Physical characteristics
- Source
  - location: valley in Conyngham Township, Columbia County, Pennsylvania
  - elevation: 1,360 to 1,380 feet (410 to 420 m)
- Mouth
  - location: Catawissa Creek in North Union Township, Schuylkill County, Pennsylvania
  - coordinates: 40°53′24″N 76°12′33″W
  - elevation: 833 ft (254 m)
- Length: 10.8 mi (17.4 km)
- Basin size: 16.70 mi^{2} (43.3 km^{2})

Basin features
- Progression: Catawissa Creek → Susquehanna River → Chesapeake Bay
- Tributaries
  - left: Trexler Run, Stony Run

Little Catawissa Creek is a tributary of Catawissa Creek in Columbia County and Schuylkill County, in Pennsylvania, in the United States. It is approximately 10.8 miles (17.4 km) long and flows through Conyngham Township in Columbia County and Union Township and North Union Township in Schuylkill County. The named tributaries of the creek include Stony Run and Trexler Run. The creek has some alkalinity and is slightly acidic. The main rock formations in the watershed of it are the Mauch Chunk Formation, the Pocono Formation, and the Pottsville Formation. A number of other rock formations occur in small areas of the watershed as well. The main soils in the watershed are the Leck Kill soil and the Hazleton soil.

The watershed of Little Catawissa Creek has an area of 16.70 square miles (43.3 km^{2}). A number of bridges cross the creek. There are a number of major roads in the watershed of the creek and most of the creek is within several hundred meters of a road. The creek is a High-Quality Coldwater Fishery and Class A Wild Trout Waters in some places. In other places, it is a Coldwater Fishery and Class D Wild Trout Waters. There are many species of fish inhabiting the creek, including brook trout, brown trout, and others. The creek has been surveyed at least nine times by the Pennsylvania Fish and Boat Commission.

== Course ==
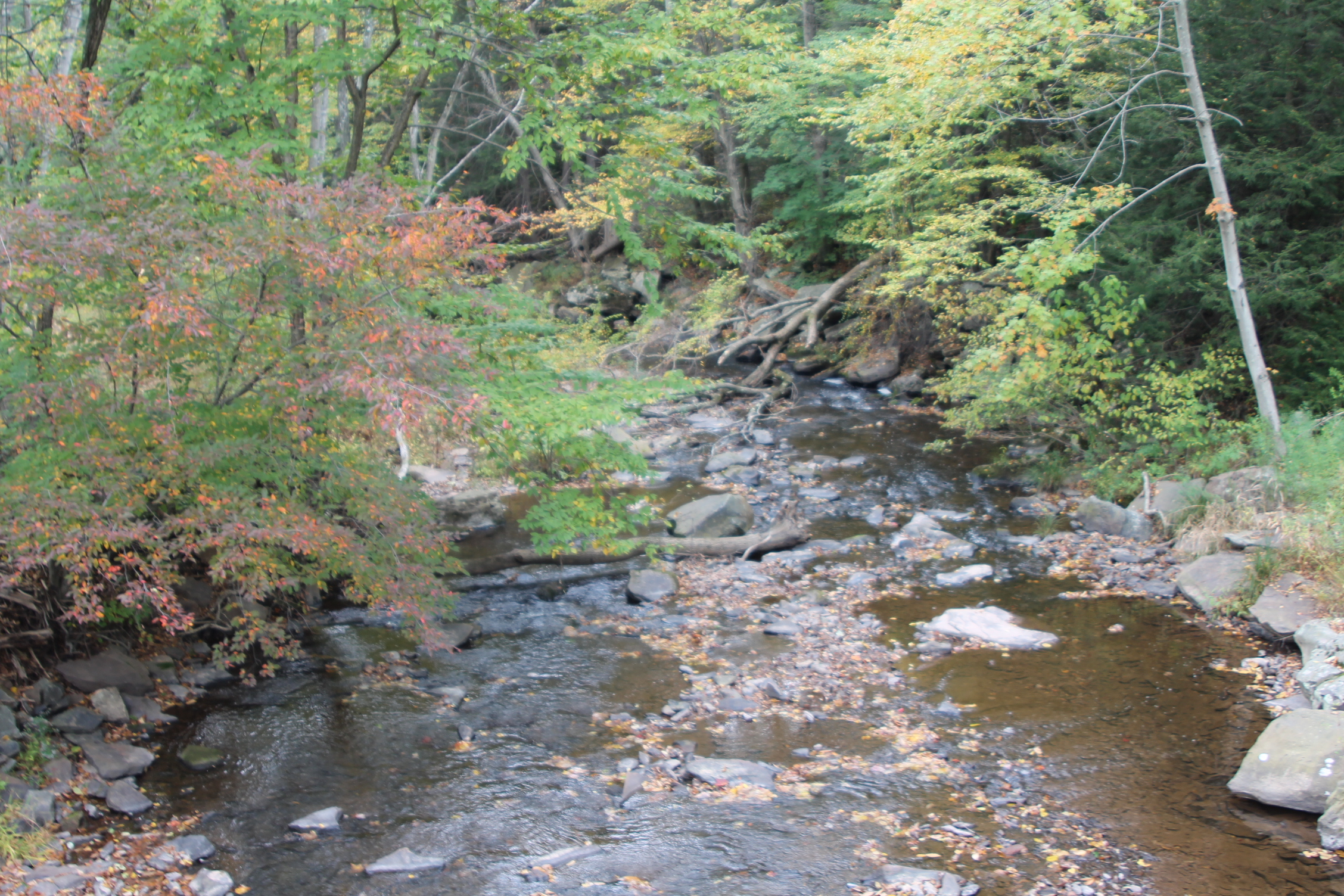
Little Catawissa Creek looking downstream immediately below the mouth of Stony Run

Little Catawissa Creek begins in a narrow valley in Conyngham Township. It flows east for a few miles in the valley, flowing roughly parallel to Aristes Ringtown Road. The creek eventually exits Conyngham Township and Columbia County.

Upon exiting Columbia County, Little Catawissa Creek enters Union Township, Schuylkill County. It continues east and its valley becomes narrower and shallower. Over the next several miles, the creek turns east-northeast and its valley gets broader again. It then turns abruptly north and passes through a ridge. The creek briefly turns northeast before turning north-northeast after a few hundred feet. Approximately a mile downstream, it receives its first named tributary, Trexler Run. At this point, the creek turns abruptly east-northeast. After some distance, it begins meandering northeast for a few miles, receiving the tributary Stony Run. It then begins meandering east for a few miles, briefly entering North Union Township, Schuylkill County before reentering East Union Township. Shortly afterwards, the creek turns north-northeast, crosses into North Union Township again. A few tenths of a mile downstream, it reaches its confluence with Catawissa Creek.

Little Catawissa Creek joins Catawissa Creek 24.24 miles (39.01 km) upstream of its mouth.

=== Tributaries ===
Little Catawissa Creek has a number of tributaries. These include Stony Run, Trexler Run, and an unnamed tributary known as "Trib 27584 To Little Catawissa Creek". Trexler Run flows through Roaring Creek Township, Columbia County and Union Township, Schuylkill County. Stony Run flows through Union Township, Schuylkill County. Stony Run joins Little Catawissa Creek 1.96 miles (3.15 km) upstream of its mouth. Its watershed has an area of 2.24 square miles (5.8 km^{2}). Trexler Run joins Little Catawissa Creek 4.24 miles (6.82 km) upstream of its mouth. Its watershed has an area of 3.81 square miles (9.9 km^{2}).

== Hydrology ==
Little Catawissa Creek is infertile in its upper reaches, from its headwaters to T431, 8.10 miles (13.04 km) upstream of its mouth. The creek is infertile and slightly acidic from T431 to T435 (8.10 miles (13.04 km) upstream of the mouth to 2.90 miles (4.67 km) upstream of the mouth). When the waters of the creek flow into Catawissa Creek, they help offset some of the acidity of the latter creek, contributing to relatively high water quality downstream of the confluence.

At 8.90 miles (14.32 km) above its mouth, the concentration of alkalinity in Little Catawissa Creek is 2 milligrams per liter (7.2×10^{−8} lb/cu in) milligrams per liter. The pH of the creek at this location is 6.4. The creek at this location is infertile and acidic, with the potential to be affected by acid precipitation. Between T431 and T435, the creek's concentration of alkalinity ranges from 10 to 13 milligrams per liter (3.6×10^{−7} to 4.7×10^{−7} lb/cu in) and its pH ranges from 6.8 to 7.0. The concentration of water hardness in the creek's waters 8.90 miles (14.32 km) upstream of its mouth is 16 milligrams per liter (5.8×10^{−7} lb/cu in). 5.40 miles (8.69 km) upstream of its mouth, the water hardness is 28 milligrams per liter (1.0×10^{−6} lb/cu in) and 3.85 miles (6.20 km) upstream of its mouth it is 22 milligrams per liter (7.9×10^{−7} lb/cu in). The water hardness of the creek's waters 2.90 miles (4.67 km) upstream of its mouth is 24 milligrams per liter (8.7×10^{−7} lb/cu in).

At 1:00 P.M. on June 26, 1997, the air temperature in the vicinity of Little Catawissa Creek 8.90 miles (14.32 km) upstream of its mouth was 28 °C (82 °F). The water temperature of the creek at this place and time was 19.8 °C (67.6 °F). At 12:40 P.M. on June 27, 1997, the air temperature near the creek was 28 °C (82 °F) and the water temperature was 21.0 °C (69.8 °F). At 3.85 miles (6.20 km) upstream of the creek's mouth, the air temperature was 24 °C (75 °F) and the water temperature was 18.4 °C (65.1 °F) on June 27, 1997, at 11:00 A.M. At 11:10 A.M. on June 30, 1997, the air temperature of the creek 2.90 miles (4.67 km) upstream of its mouth was 27 °C (81 °F) and the water temperature was 17.1 °C (62.8 °F).

The specific conductivity of the waters of Little Catawissa Creek is 80 micro-mhos 8.90 miles (14.32 km) upstream of its mouth. The specific conductivity of the creek's waters 5.40 miles (8.69 km) and 3.85 miles (6.20 km) upstream of its mouth is 86 and 76 micro-mhos respectively. The specific conductivity 2.90 miles (4.67 km) upstream of its mouth is 80 micro-mhos.

== Geography and geology ==
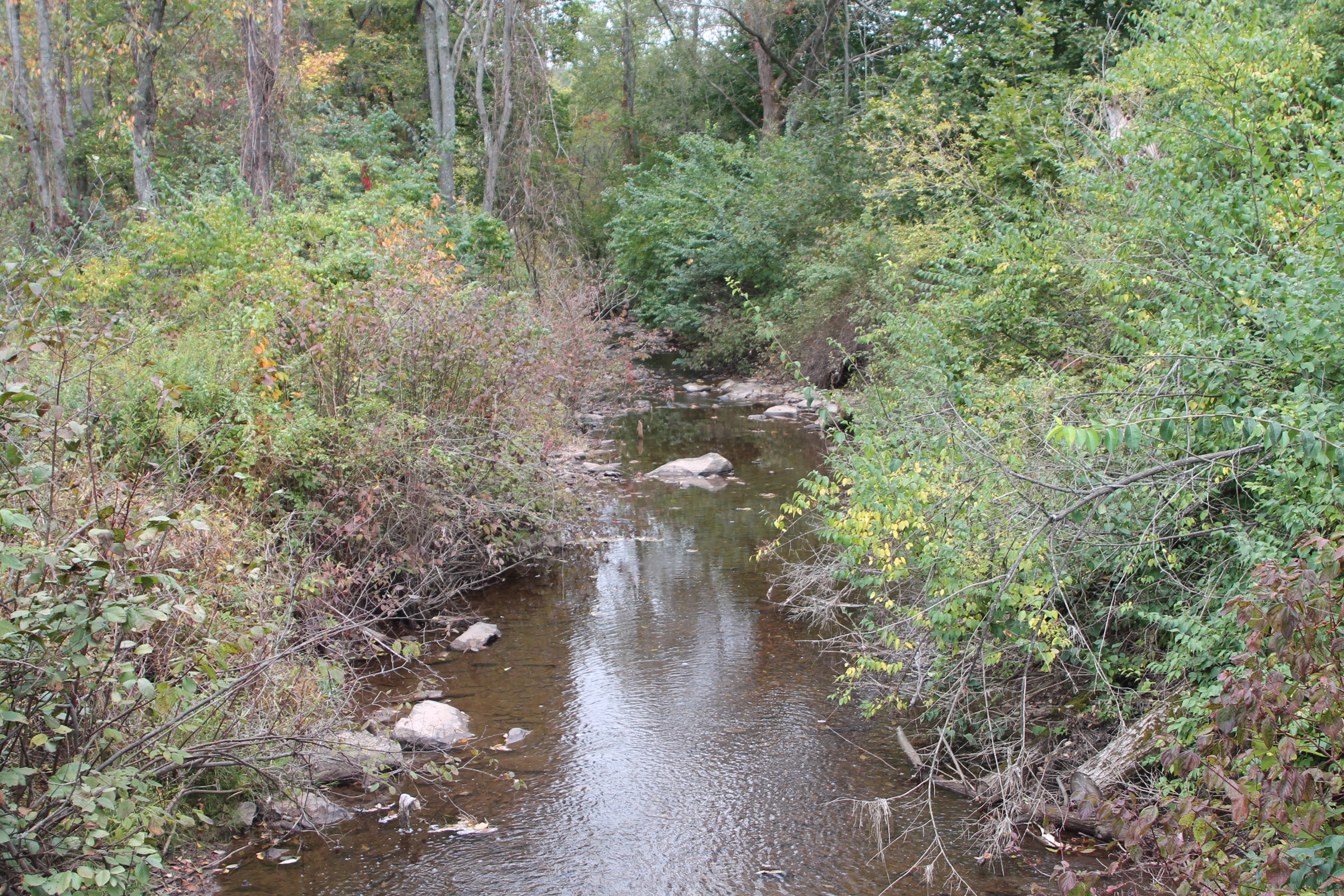
Little Catawissa Creek at the huylkill County Bridge No. 95

The elevation near the mouth of Little Catawissa Creek is 833 feet (254 m) above sea level. The elevation of the creek's source is between 1,360 feet (410 m) and 1,380 feet (420 m) above sea level.

Little Catawissa Creek flows over rock of the Mauch Chunk Formation for its entire length. Most of the rest of the watershed is also on this rock formation. However, other rock formations also occur in the watershed. A substantial area of the Pocono Formation can be found in the northwestern part of the watershed and large areas of rock of the Pottsville Formation occupy portions of the southern and western parts of the watershed. Small areas of the Spechty Kopf Formation and the Buddys Run Member of the Catskill Formation are found in the northwestern part of the watershed.

Little Catawissa Creek flows over Leck Kill soil for most of its length. However, its headwaters are on Hazleton soil. Additionally, the westernmost and southernmost parts of the watershed are on Hazleton soil, as is the northwestern part of the watershed.

Little Catawissa Creek is flanked by areas prone to flooding between the point where it enters Schuylkill County and its mouth. The tributary Stony Run also flows through some areas prone to flooding and a few areas near Trexler Run are susceptible to flooding as well. Other small areas prone to flooding are scattered throughout the watershed of the creek.

Between the headwaters of Little Catawissa Creek and T431, the width of the creek is 3.0 meters (9.8 ft) wide. Between T431 and T435, the creek is 5.3 meters (17 ft) wide and between T435 and the creek's mouth, its width is 6.2 metres (20 ft). The gradient of the creek upstream of T431 is 20.8 meters per kilometer (110 ft/mi). The gradient between T431 and T435 is 5.6 meters per kilometer (30 ft/mi) and the gradient between T435 and the mouth of the creek is 7.7 meters per kilometer (41 ft/mi) meters per kilometer.

There is a flooded strip mine in the western part of the watershed of Little Catawissa Creek. The headwaters of the creek are on a mountain known as Big Mountain. The creek is a freestone stream.

== Watershed ==
The watershed of Little Catawissa Creek has an area of 16.70 square miles (43.3 km^{2}). Most of the watershed is in Union Township, Schuylkill County. However, substantial portions are in Conyngham Township, Columbia County and Columbia County. Smaller parts of the watershed are in southern North Union Township, Schuylkill County and western Ringtown, also in Schuylkill County.

Major roads in the watershed of Little Catawissa Creek include Zion Grove Road, Little Mountain Road, and Aristes Road. Additionally, Pennsylvania Route 42 traverses the western edge of the creek's watershed. Between its headwaters and T431, none of the creek's length is within 100 metres (330 ft) of a road, but all of its length is within 300 metres (980 ft) of a road. Between T431 and T435, 29 percent of the creek's length is within 100 metres (330 ft) of a road, 66 percent is within 300 metres (980 ft) and 81 percent is within 500 metres (1,600 ft). Between T435 and the creek's mouth, 21 percent of the creek's length is within 100 metres (330 ft) of a road, 40 percent is within 300 metres (980 ft) of one, and 66 percent is within 500 metres (1,600 ft) of one.

In 1990, the population density of the upper reaches of the watershed of Little Catawissa Creek was 30 people per square kilometer. The population density in the middle reaches of the creek's watershed was 40 people per square kilometer and the density in the lower reaches of the watershed was 31 people per square kilometer. The creek is completely closed to public access between T435 and its mouth.

There are large areas of agricultural land in the middle reaches of the watershed of Little Catawissa Creek, but most of the agricultural operations in the watershed are relatively small. The main areas of residential development in the watershed are the communities of Aristes and Ringtown. The Pennsylvania Department of Environmental Protection has issued four mining permits in the watershed of the creek. All of these permits are for mining on a ridge on the northern edge of the watershed. There are a number of other land uses in the creek's watershed. These include private forests and rural residences.

Little Catawissa Creek is on the United States Geological Survey quadrangles of Ashland, Shenandoah, and Nuremberg. It is managed by the Pennsylvania Fish and Boat Commission between T431, 8.10 miles (13.04 km) upstream of the mouth and T435, 2.90 miles (4.67 km) upstream of the mouth.

A reservoir known as the Ringtown Reservoir is on an unnamed tributary of Little Catawissa Creek.

== History and etymology ==
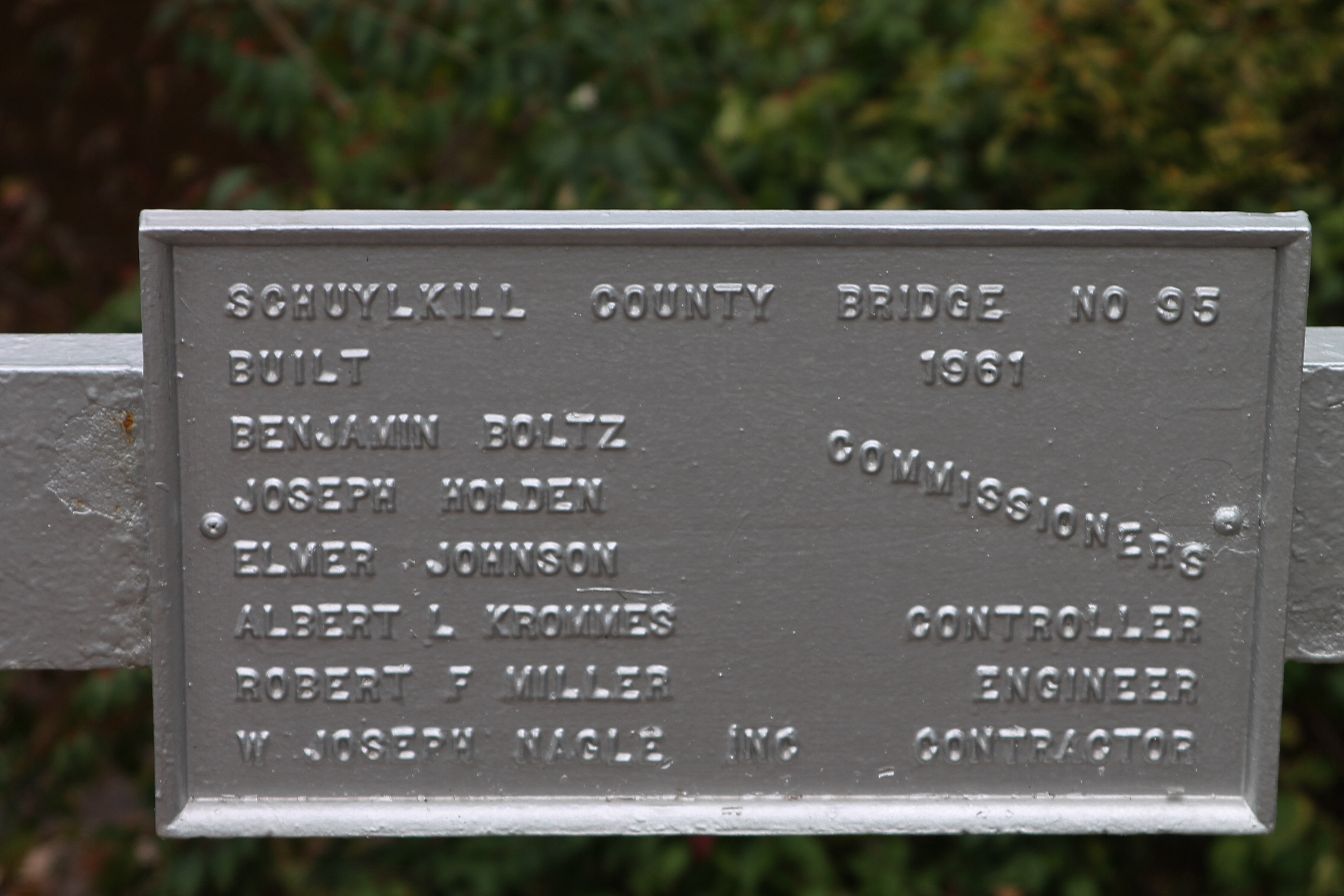
Sign for the Schuylkill County Bridge No. 95 over Little Catawissa Creek

Little Catawissa Creek is named for the fact that it is smaller than Catawissa Creek.

Little Catawissa Creek was historically stocked with trout from near the border between Columbia County and Schuylkill County downstream to the mouth of the creek. The creek was surveyed by the Pennsylvania Fish and Boat Commission nine times between 1939 and 1985. The first survey was performed in 1936. This was the first time that the creek was recommended for trout stocking. The creek was also surveyed by the Pennsylvania Fish and Boat Commission several times in the 1950s, 1960s, 1970s, and 1980s.

A number of bridges have been built over Little Catawissa Creek. A steel stringer bridge was built over the creek in 1914 and restored in 1939. This bridge is 40.0 feet (12.2 m) long. Another bridge was built over the creek in 1930. It is a concrete arch bridge that is 60.0 feet (18.3 m) long. In 1961, a prestressed box beam bridge was built across the creek. This bridge is 47.9 feet (14.6 m) long. A concrete slab bridge was built over the creek in 1973 and a prestressed box beam bridge was built over it in 1990. These bridges are 30.8 feet (9.4 m) and 57.1 feet (17.4 m) long, respectively.

John Mourey constructed a sawmill and gristmill on Little Catawissa Creek 0.5 miles (0.80 km) west of Ringtown in 1853. Little Catawissa Creek was used as an emergency water supply in the early 1900s.

== Biology ==
Little Catawissa Creek is considered by the Pennsylvania Department of Environmental Protection to be a High-Quality Coldwater Fishery between its headwaters and Reservoir Road. Between Reservoir Road and the mouth of the creek, it is considered to be a Coldwater Fishery. The upper reaches of the creek, between its headwaters and a point slightly downstream of where it enters Schuylkill County are considered by the Pennsylvania Fish and Boat Commission to be Class A Wild Trout Waters and the rest of the creek's length is considered to be Approved Trout Waters. The upper reaches of the creek were Class A Wild Trout Waters in 1976 before becoming Class D Wild Trout Waters in 1984. This change was due to acid mine drainage and sediment buildup. However, the creek rebounded to Class A Wild Trout Waters by 1997. The creek is considered to be Class D Wild Trout Waters between T431 and T435. The tributary Trexler Run is also considered to be Class A Wild Trout Waters throughout its length.

Wild brook trout naturally reproduce in Little Catawissa Creek. However, introducing rainbow trout into the creek is forbidden, although they were historically stocked there by the Pennsylvania Fish and Boat Commission. River chubs were historically present in the creek, but have disappeared. The reason for this disappearance is unknown.

Between the headwaters of Little Catawissa Creek and 8.10 miles (13.04 km) upstream of its mouth, at T431, there are three species of fish: brook trout, creek chub, and eastern blacknose dace. White suckers were also observed in this part of the creek in 1976. There are twelve species of fish in the creek between T431 and T435, including brook trout, brown trout, and green sunfish. Additionally, numerous more have been historically observed in this stretch of the creek, but are not any more. Eight fish species, including brown trout, were observed on the creek between T435 and its mouth during a 1976 survey. The brown trout ranged from 300 to 324 millimeters (11.8 to 12.8 in).

The biomass of wild trout in Little Catawissa Creek upstream of T431 is 30.85 kilograms per hectare (27.52 lb/acre). This includes 24.81 kilograms per hectare (22.13 lb/acre) of brook trout that are less than 175 millimeters (6.9 in) long and 6.04 kilograms per hectare (5.39 lb/acre) of brook trout that are more than 175 millimeters (6.9 in) long. The trout in this part of the creek range from 25 to 224 millimeters (0.98 to 8.82 in). The biomass of wild trout in the creek between T431 and T405 is 5.08 kilograms per hectare (4.53 lb/acre). 4.97 kilograms per hectare (4.43 lb/acre) kilograms per hectare come from brown trout (including 0.98 kilograms per hectare (0.87 lb/acre) from brown trout shorter than 175 millimeters (6.9 in) and 3.99 kilograms per hectare (3.56 lb/acre) from brown trout longer than 175 millimeters) and 0.11 kilograms per hectare (0.098 lb/acre) come from brook trout over 175 millimeters (6.9 in) long. The brown trout range from 50 to 299 millimeters (2.0 to 11.8 in) long and the brook trout range from 50 to 224 millimeters (2.0 to 8.8 in) long.

Between the headwaters of Little Catawissa Creek and T431, there are 799 brook trout per square kilometer that are shorter than 175 millimeters and 23 per kilometer that are longer. There are 2997 brook trout per hectare that are less than 175 millimeters long and 88 that are more than 175 millimeters long. In the creek between T431 and T435, there is one brook trout per kilometer that is less than 175 millimeters long and one per kilometer that is more than 175 millimeters long. On the other hand, there are 197 brown trout per kilometer less than 175 millimeters long and 25 per kilometer that are more than 175 millimeters long. There is one brook trout per hectare that are less than 175 millimeters long and one that is more than 175 millimeters long. There are 230 brook trout per hectare that are less than 175 millimeters long and 31 that are more than 175 millimeters long.

A 1997 report stated that Little Catawissa Creek was a poor site for angling.

Little Catawissa Creek has a diverse population of aquatic macroinvertebrates.

== See also ==
- Tomhicken Creek, next tributary of Catawissa Creek going downstream
- Dark Run next tributary of Catawissa Creek going upstream
- List of tributaries of Catawissa Creek
