= Dark Run =

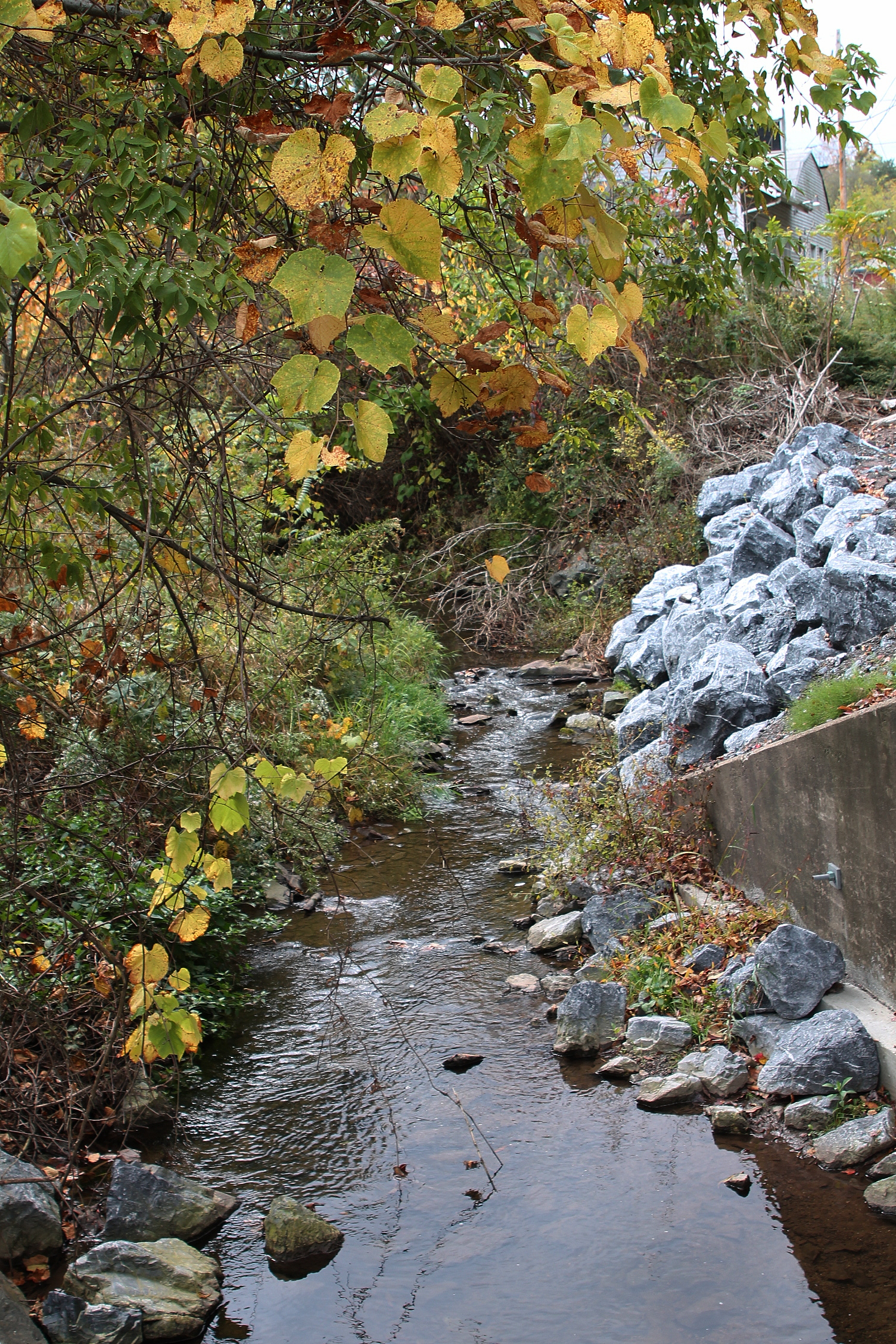
- Dark Run looking upstream near Ringtown

Physical characteristics
- Source
  - location: Union Township, Schuylkill County, Pennsylvania near Pattersonville
  - elevation: 1,160 to 1,180 feet (350 to 360 m)
- Mouth
  - location: Catawissa Creek in Union Township, Schuylkill County, Pennsylvania
  - coordinates: 40°52′56″N 76°12′23″W
  - elevation: 843 ft (257 m)
- Length: 4.3 mi (6.9 km)
- Basin size: 4.55 mi^{2} (11.8 km^{2})

Basin features
- Progression: Catawissa Creek → Susquehanna River → Chesapeake Bay
- Tributaries
  - left: "Trib 27588 to Dark Run", "Trib 27587 to Dark Run", "Trib 27586 to Dark Run"
  - right: "Trib 27590 to Dark Run", "Trib 27589 to Dark Run"

Dark Run is a tributary of Catawissa Creek in Schuylkill County, Pennsylvania, in the United States. It is approximately 4.3 miles (6.9 km) long and flows through Union Township. The watershed of the stream has an area of 4.55 square miles (11.8 km^{2}). The stream is considered to be a High-Quality Coldwater Fishery and Class D Wild Trout Waters. Eight species of fish inhabit the stream. The main rock formations in the stream's watershed are the Mauch Chunk Formation and the main soil is the Leck Kill soil. The stream has several unnamed tributaries.

== Course ==
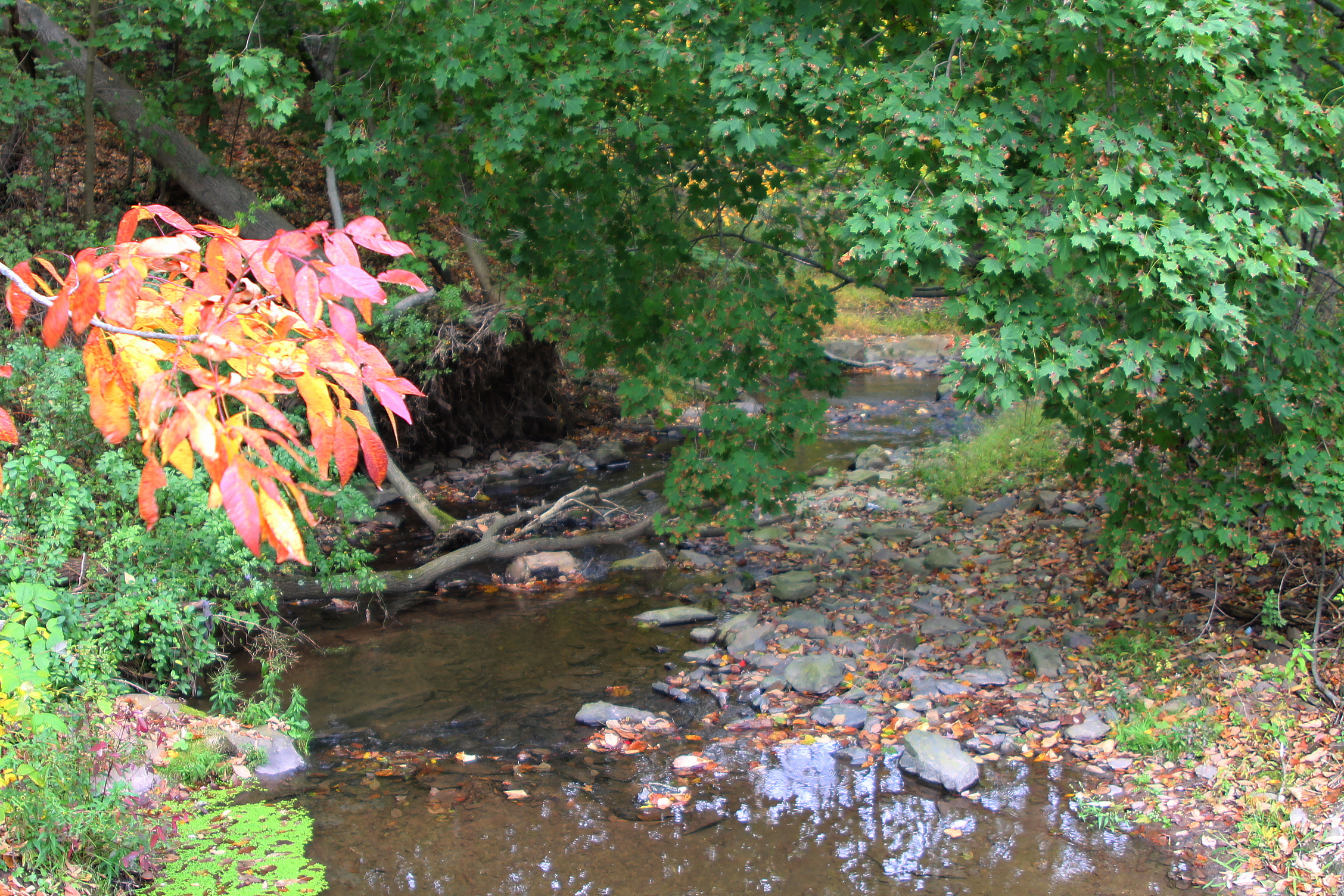
Dark Run looking downstream near Ringtown

Dark Run begins in Union Township, a few tenths of a mile west of the community of Pattersonville. The stream flows north for several tenths of a mile, passing through a pond. It eventually turns east and passes through another pond before turning northeast. After some distance, the stream receives two unnamed tributaries and turns north-northeast, cutting through a ridge. On the other side of the ridge, it receives another unnamed tributary and passes through the southeastern corner of Ringtown before returning to Union Township. The stream continues north-northeast and receives another unnamed tributary before cutting through another ridge. It then meanders northeast for approximately a mile until it reaches its confluence with Catawissa Creek on the border between Union Township and East Union Township.

Dark Run joins Catawissa Creek 24.83 miles (39.96 km) upstream of its mouth.

=== Tributaries ===
Dark Run has no named tributaries. However, it has several unnamed tributaries. "Trib 27590 to Dark Run" is the first unnamed tributary to enter the stream. It is followed closely by "Trib 27589 to Dark Run". "Trib 27588 to Dark Run" and "Trib 27587 to Dark Run" join the stream east of Ringtown. "Trib 27586 to Dark Run" joins it not far from its mouth.

== Hydrology ==
Dark Run, along with Little Catawissa Creek, contributes relatively fertile water to Catawissa Creek. However, the stream is affected by agricultural runoff.

The pH of Dark Run 2.66 miles (4.28 km) upstream of its mouth is 7.0 and the concentration of alkalinity at this location is 16 milligrams per liter. The pH of the stream 1.71 miles (2.75 km) upstream of its mouth is 7.4 and the concentration of alkalinity is 28 milligrams per liter. The water hardness of the stream 2.66 miles (4.28 km) upstream of its mouth is 34 milligrams per liter.

At 1:35 P.M. on June 19, 1997, the air temperature in the vicinity of Dark Run 2.66 miles (4.28 km) upstream of its mouth was 29 °C (84 °F). The water temperature at that location and time was 17.5 °C (63.5 °F). At 12:00 P.M. on June 20, 1997, the air temperature near the stream 1.71 miles (2.75 km) upstream of its mouth was 27 °C (81 °F). The water temperature at this time and location was 17.2 °C (63.0 °F). The specific conductivity of the stream's waters 2.66 miles (4.28 km) upstream of its mouth is 118 umhos and the specific conductivity 1.71 miles (2.75 km) upstream of its mouth is 171 umhos.

== Geography and geology ==
The elevation near the mouth of Dark Run is 843 feet (257 m) above sea level. The elevation of the stream's source is between 1,160 feet (350 m) and 1,180 feet (360 m) above sea level.

Dark Run and all of its tributaries are on rock of the Mauch Chunk Formation. This rock formation consists of siltstone, sandstone, grayish-red shale, and conglomerate. The entire length of the stream and all of its tributaries are on Leck Kill soil.

Dark Run is a small stream, with a width of 3.3 metres (11 ft). It has a low gradient of 13.5 meters per kilometer.

Dark Run is surrounded by areas prone to flooding during a 100-year flood between its mouth and Ringtown. "Trib 27588 to Dark Run" is surrounded by such areas throughout its length. There are also a few others areas in the watershed that are prone to flooding during a 100-year flood.

== Watershed ==
The watershed of Dark Run has an area of 4.55 square miles (11.8 km^{2}). Most of the watershed is in Union Township. However, the watershed also occupies nearly all of Ringtown. There is agricultural land throughout the watershed, especially in the valley of the stream. Additionally, it contains some club and association land in its upper and lower reaches.

Major roads in the watershed of Dark Run include Rattlin Run Road, Ringtown Boulevard, Pattersonville Road, Center Street, and Main Street, the last two of which are in Ringtown. 33 percent of the stream's length is within 100 metres (330 ft) of a road and 66 percent is within 300 metres (980 ft) of one. 95 percent of the stream is within 500 metres (1,600 ft) of a road. In 1990, the population density of the watershed 40 people per square mile.

Dark Run is in the United States Geological Survey quadrangles of Nuremberg and Shenandoah. The stream is one of the southernmost tributaries of Catawissa Creek. There are three water resources on Dark Run in its upper reaches. Another water resource is near the mouth of "Trib 27588 to Dark Run" and one other is in the upper reaches of "Trib 27587 to Dark Run".

A bridge carrying Farmers Road was built over Dark Run in 1960. It is a steel stringer bridge that is 26.9 feet (8.2 m) long. It is currently closed.

== Biology ==
Dark Run is considered by the Pennsylvania Department of Environmental Protection to be a High-Quality Coldwater Fishery, although it was historically a Coldwater Fishery. It is the only tributary of Catawissa Creek to be a High-Quality Coldwater Fishery, but not Class A Wild Trout Waters. The stream is inhabited by native trout. It is one of the few fertile streams in the watershed of Catawissa Creek that support fish life. The stream is considered to be Class D Wild Trout Waters. A 1997 report advised against stocking the stream. The stream is not stocked due to its high level of narrowness.

There are eight species of fish inhabiting Dark Run. These include brook trout, brown trout, and largemouth bass. However, the brown trout in the stream are from hatcheries and the largemouth bass come from farm ponds. Eight fish species inhabit the stream 2.66 miles (4.28 km) upstream of its mouth and six species inhabit it 1.71 miles (2.75 km) upstream of its mouth.

The biomass of wild brook trout in Dark Run is 6.85 kilograms per hectare, including 0.98 kilograms per hectare of brook trout less than 175 millimeters long and 5.87 kilograms per hectare that are more than 175 millimeters long. These trout range from 50 to 249 millimeters in length. There are 30 brook trout per kilometer that are less than 175 millimeters long and 20 per kilometer that are more than 175 millimeters long. There are 105 brook trout per hectare that are less than 175 millimeters long and 76 per hectare that are more than 175 millimeters long.

A 1997 report stated that Dark Run was a poor site for angling.

== See also ==
- Little Catawissa Creek, next tributary of Catawissa Creek going downstream
- Rattling Run, next tributary of Catawissa Creek going upstream
- List of tributaries of Catawissa Creek
