= Trexler Run =

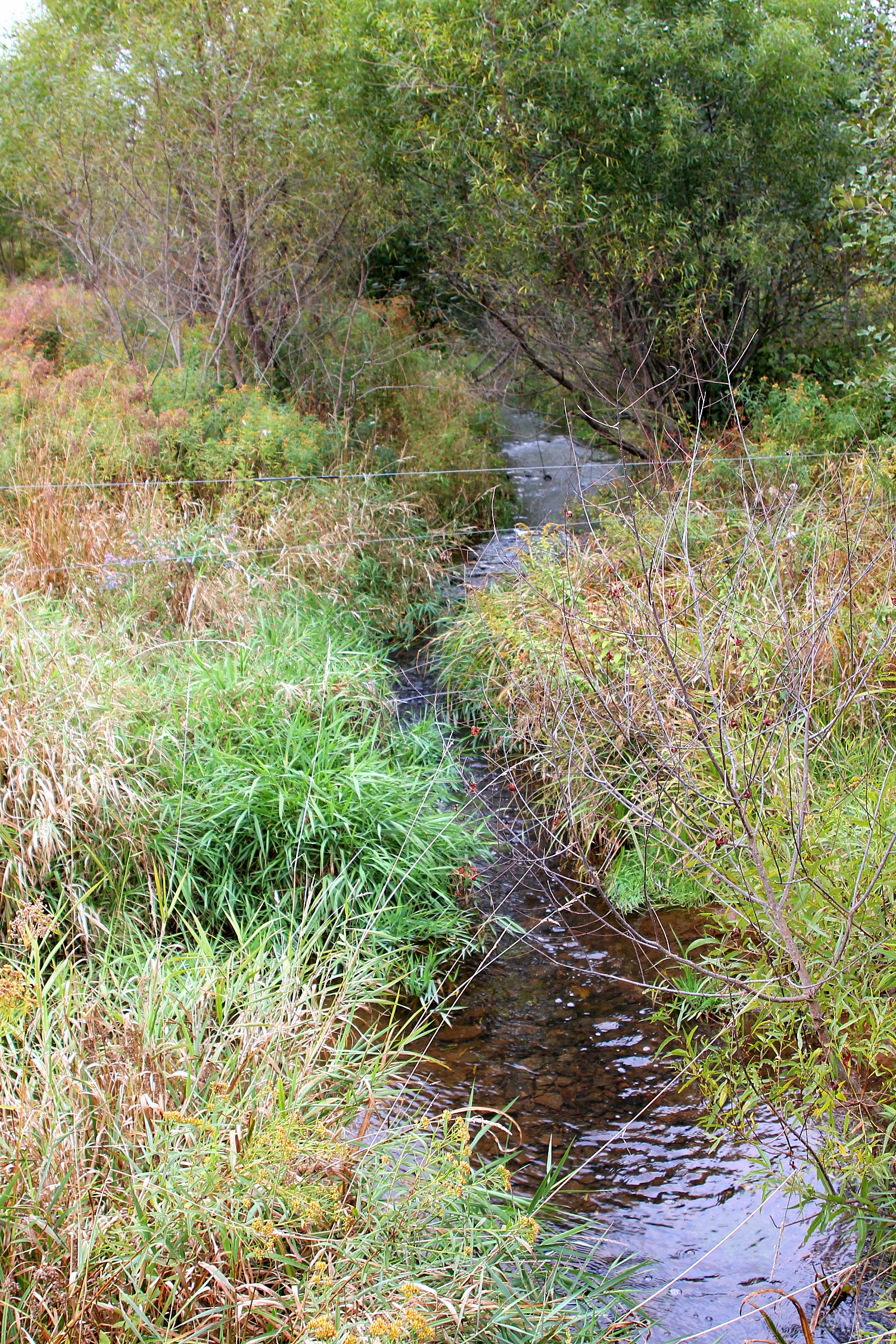
- Trexler Run looking upstream from Pine Swamp Road

Physical characteristics
- Source
  - location: valley on Little Mountain in Roaring Creek Township, Pennsylvania
  - elevation: 1,560 ft (480 m)
- Mouth
  - location: Little Catawissa Creek in Union Township, Schuylkill County, Pennsylvania
  - coordinates: 40°51′51″N 76°15′13″W
  - elevation: 1,000 ft (300 m)
- Length: 3.4 mi (5.5 km)
- Basin size: 3.4 sq mi (8.8 km^{2})
- Discharge
  - average: 0.60 cu ft/s (0.017 m^{3}/s)

Basin features
- Progression: Little Catawissa Creek → Catawissa Creek → Susquehanna River → Chesapeake Bay

Trexler Run is a tributary of Little Catawissa Creek in Columbia and Schuylkill counties in Pennsylvania, in the United States. It is approximately 3.4 miles (5.5 km) long and flows through Roaring Creek Township in Columbia County and Union Township in Schuylkill County. The watershed of the stream has an area of 3.81 square miles (9.9 km^{2}). The stream is considered to be a High-Quality Coldwater Fishery and Class A Wild Trout Waters. The main rock formations in the stream's watershed are the Mauch Chunk Formation, the Pocono Formation, and the Pottsville Formation and the main soil is the Leck Kill soil. Both brook trout and brown trout inhabit the stream, as do several other species of fish.

== Course ==
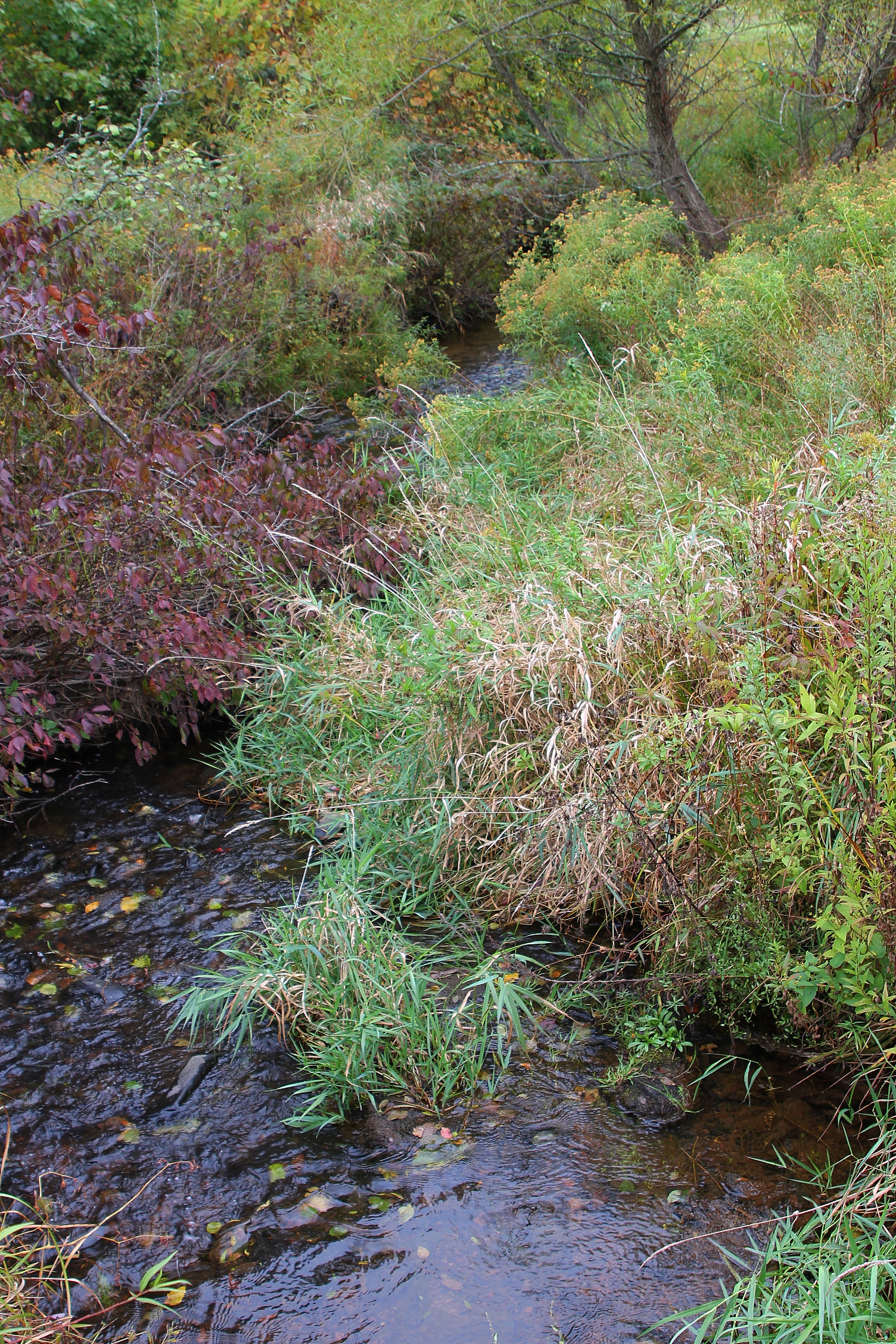
Trexler Run looking downstream from Pine Swamp Road

Trexler Run begins in a valley on Little Mountain in Roaring Creek Township, Columbia County. It flows south-southeast for several tenths of a mile, exiting Roaring Creek Township and Columbia County.

Upon exiting Columbia County, Trexler Run enters Union Township, Schuylkill County. It continues south-southeast, crossing State Route 4036, for a short distance before receiving an unnamed tributary and turning east in a valley. After some distance, it crosses State Route 4036 again and continues east and slightly north. The stream eventually turns north for a short distance before turning east-northeast. After slightly more than a mile, it reaches its confluence with Little Catawissa Creek.

Trexler Run joins Little Catawissa Creek 4.24 miles (6.82 km) upstream of its mouth.

== Hydrology ==
Trexler Run is infertile and slightly acidic. It has the potential to be affected by acid precipitation.

The concentration of alkalinity in Trexler Run was measured to be 4 milligrams per liter in 1985. More recently, in 1997, it was measured to be 10 milligrams per liter. The pH of the stream was measured to be 6.4 in 1985 and 6.6 in 1997. The water hardness of the stream is 15 milligrams per liter.

At 1:10 P.M. on June 30, 1997, the air temperature in the vicinity of Trexler Run 0.80 miles (1.29 km) upstream of its mouth was 28 °C (82 °F). The water temperature of the stream at this location was 16.3 °C (61.3 °F). The specific conductivity of the stream's waters is 43 umhos.

The discharge of Trexler Run near Ringtown has been measured by the United States Geological Survey several times. The discharge of the stream ranged from 0.210 to 1.70 cubic feet per second in these measurements. The average discharge was 0.60 cubic feet per second. The peak annual discharge of the stream between 1959 and 1980 ranged from 8.80 cubic feet per second in 1965 to 487 cubic feet per second in 1972. The gauge height during the peak annual discharges ranged from 1.83 feet (0.56 m) in 1967 to 5.15 feet (1.57 m) in 1972.

== Geography and geology ==
The elevation near the mouth of Trexler Run is 1,000 feet (300 m) above sea level. The elevation of the creek's source is approximately 1,560 feet (480 m) above sea level.

Most of the length of Trexler Run is on rock of the Mauch Chunk Formation. However, the headwaters of the stream are on rock of the Pocono Formation. The Pottsville Formation is in the southern part of the watershed and the Spechty Kopf Formation and the Buddys Run Member of the Catskill Formation occur in the northwestern part of the watershed. The southern and central parts of the watershed, including most of the stream's length, are on Leck Kill soil. The northern part of the watershed, including the stream's headwaters, are on Hazleton soil.

The headwaters of Trexler Run are on a mountain known as Little Mountain. The watershed is surrounded by ridges. It also contains valleys. A till-capped deposit of sand known as the Hill runs from the flank of Little Mountain to Trexler Run. The Hill has forced the stream southwards and the stream makes a wide loop around it. Near this geographical feature, the stream has a narrow channel that cuts 40 feet (12 m) into bedrock. The Hill was formed by glacial activity.

There are a few small areas that are prone to flooding scattered throughout the watershed of Trexler Run.

Trexler Run is a small stream, with a width of 3.7 metres (12 ft). It has a low gradient of 12.6 meters per kilometer.

== Watershed ==
The watershed of Trexler Run has an area of 3.81 square miles (9.9 km^{2}). The watershed of mostly in Union Township, Schuylkill County, but a substantial portion of it is in Roaring Creek Township, Columbia County.

Trexler Run flows through agricultural lands throughout much of its length. These lands are mostly on the valley floors of the watershed. Forests are found on the ridges that surround the watershed. There is some land belonging to Nature Conservancy Priority Forest Hubs found in the northern part of the watershed.

Major roads in the watershed of Trexler Run include Little Mountain Road. 64 percent of the stream's length is within 100 metres (330 ft) of road. 89 percent of its length is within 300 metres (980 ft) of a road and the entire length of the stream is within 500 metres (1,600 ft) of a road. The population density of the watershed in 1990 was 23 people per square kilometer.

50 percent of the length of Trexler Run is on private land that is open to fishing. The remaining 50 percent is on private land that is closed to fishing.

Trexler Run is in the United States Geological Survey quadrangle of Ashland.

== History ==
Trexler Run has been surveyed by the Pennsylvania Fish and Boat Commission three times. The first was performed by Shoemaker in 1932 and advised against stocking the stream on account of its small size. A second survey was carried out in 1939 by Lech. This survey also suggested not stocking the stream because public access was restricted by posting. However, it was stocked with fingerling brown trout and brook trout by the Pennsylvania Fish and Boat Commission five times between 1940 and 1957. The third survey was carried out by Daniels in 1985.

A prestressed slab bridge was built over Trexler Run in 1989. It is 23.0 feet (7.0 m) long and carries Pine Swamp Road.

== Biology ==
Trexler Run is considered by the Pennsylvania Department of Environmental Protection to be a High-Quality Coldwater Fishery, although it was historically a Coldwater Fishery instead. Additionally, it is considered by the Pennsylvania Fish and Boat Commission to be Class A Wild Trout Waters. A 1997 report advised against stocking the stream.

There are seven species of fish inhabiting Trexler Run. These species include brook trout, brown trout, pumpkinseeds, and largemouth bass. However, the largemouth bass originate from nearby farm ponds. Six of the seven species of fish living in the stream were present before 1997.

In 1984, the biomass of wild trout was 85.19 kilograms per hectare. This included 81.18 kilograms per hectare of brown trout and 4.01 kilograms per hectare of brook trout. By 1997, the wild trout biomass decreased to 50.85 kilograms per hectare. This included 39.66 kilograms per hectare of brown trout (including 5.72 kilograms per hectare of brown trout less than 175 millimeters long and 33.94 kilograms per hectare of brown trout that are more than 175 millimeters long) and 11.19 kilograms per hectare of brook trout (including 4.45 kilograms per hectare of brook trout that are less than 175 millimeters long and 6.74 kilograms per hectare of brook trout that are less than 175 millimeters long.

The brook trout inhabiting Trexler Run range from 50 to 249 millimeters in length. The brown trout inhabiting the stream range from 25 to 349 millimeters in length. There are 354 wild trout per kilometer that are less than 175 millimeters long, including 254 brook trout and 100 brown trout. There are 97 wild trout per kilometer that are more than 175 millimeters long, including 27 brook trout and 70 brown trout. The stream has 1143 wild trout per hectare that are less than 175 millimeters long, including 820 brook trout and 323 brown trout. It has 312 wild trout per hectare that are more than 175 millimeters long, including 86 brook trout and 226 brown trout.

A 1997 report stated that Trexler Run was an excellent site for angling.

Trexler Run is one of two streams in the watershed of Catawissa Creek with a significant population of brown trout.

== See also ==
- Stony Run (Little Catawissa Creek), next tributary of Little Catawissa Creek going downstream
