= Stony Run (Little Catawissa Creek tributary) =

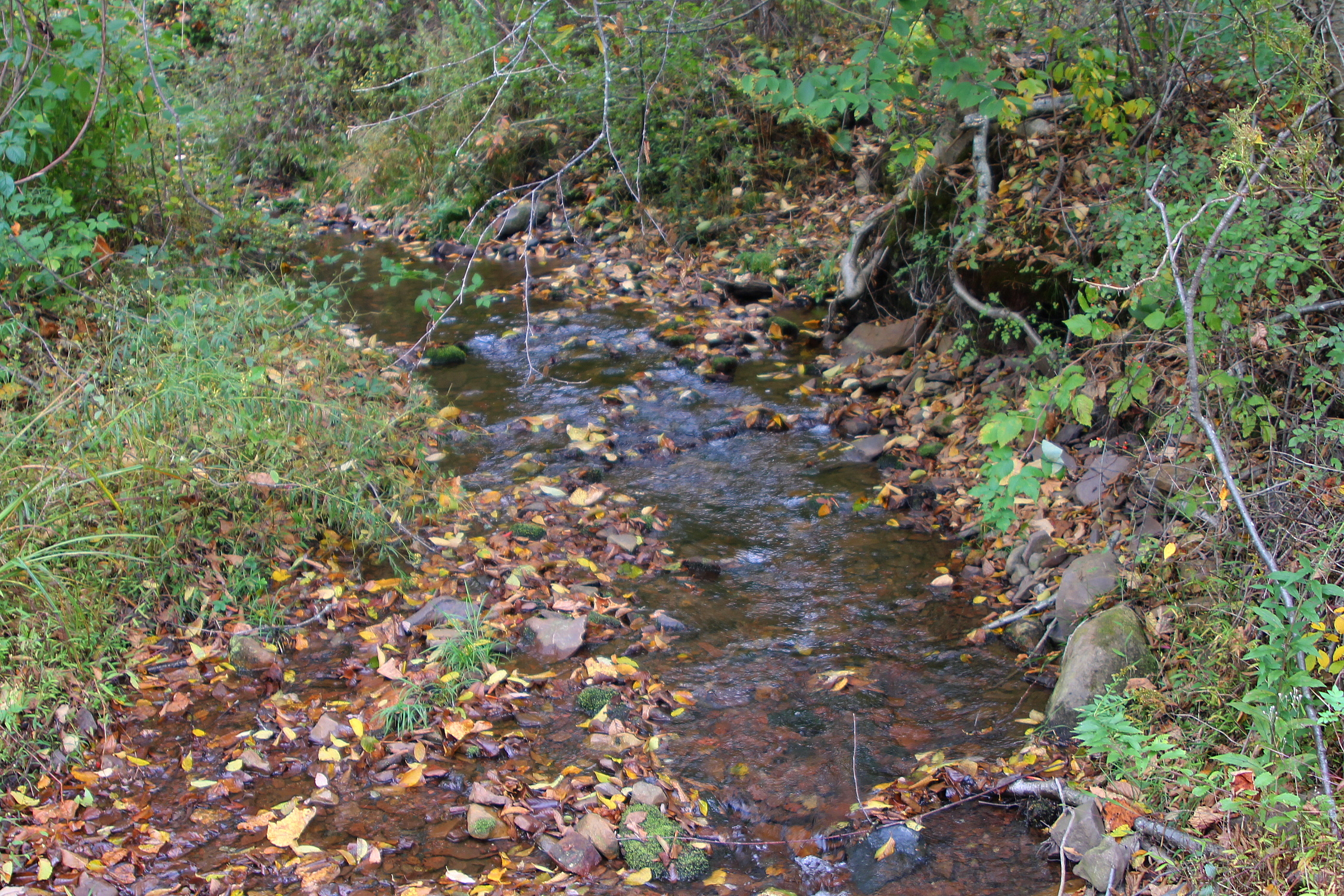
- Stony Run

Physical characteristics
- Source
  - location: Little Mountain in Union Township, Schuylkill County, Pennsylvania
  - elevation: 1,460 to 1,480 feet (450 to 450 m)
- Mouth
  - location: Little Catawissa Creek in Union Township, Schuylkill County, Pennsylvania
  - coordinates: 40°52′53″N 76°13′57″W
  - elevation: 912 ft (278 m)
- Length: 2.2 mi (3.5 km)
- Basin size: 2.24 mi^{2} (5.8 km^{2})

Basin features
- Progression: Little Catawissa Creek → Catawissa Creek → Susquehanna River → Chesapeake Bay

Stony Run is a tributary of Little Catawissa Creek in Schuylkill County, Pennsylvania, in the United States. It is approximately 2.2 miles (3.5 km) long and flows through Union Township. The watershed of the stream has an area of 2.24 square miles (5.8 km^{2}). The stream is polluted and acidic. However, it is considered to be a coldwater fishery. The main rock formations in the stream's watershed are the Mauch Chunk Formation and the Pocono Formation. The main soils in the watershed are the Leck Kill soil and the Hazleton soil. No fish inhabit the stream.

== Course ==
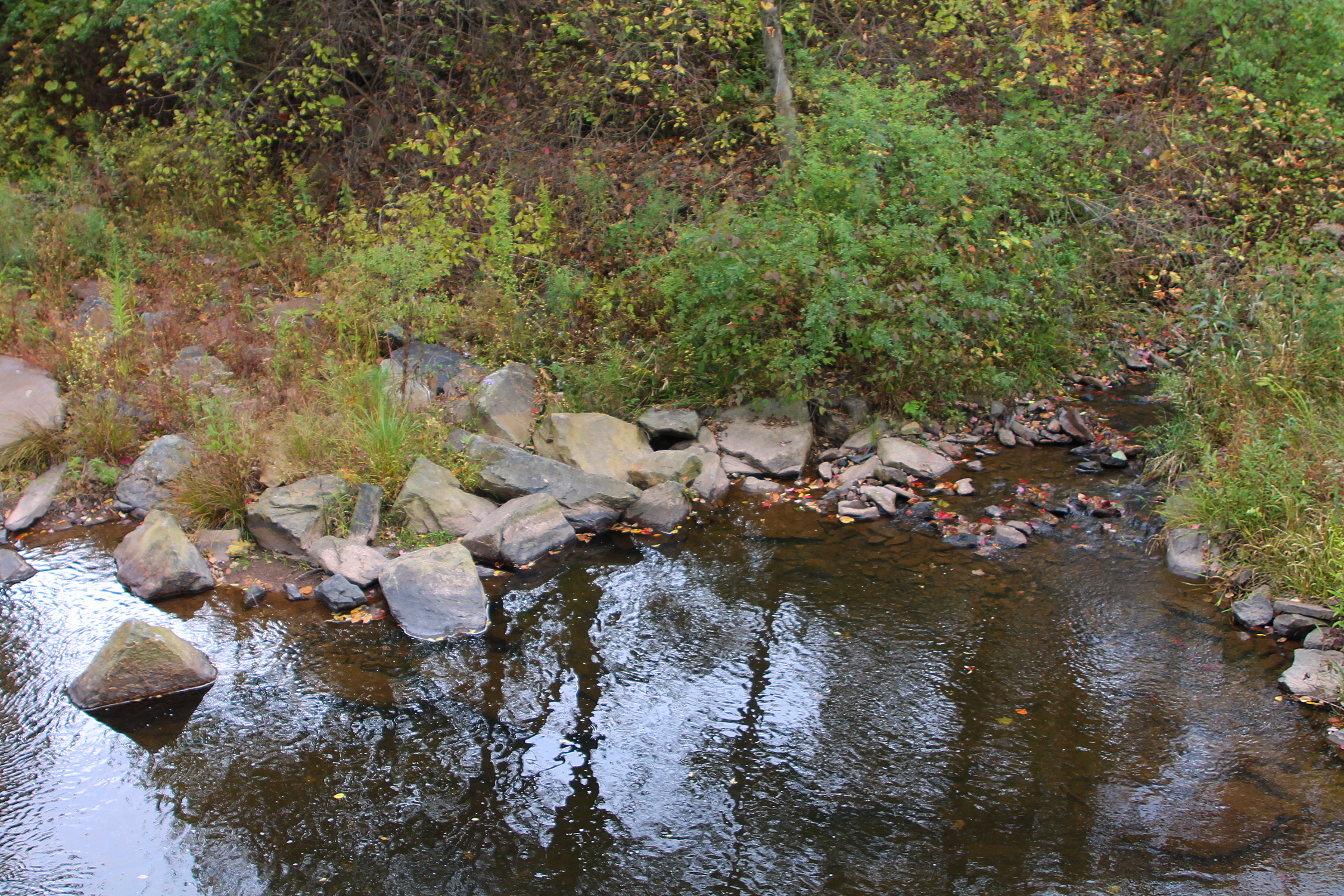
Stony Run (right) at its confluence with Little Catawissa Creek

Stony Run begins on Little Mountain in Union Township. It flows east for several tenths of a mile before turning southeast for several hundred feet, leaving behind Catawissa Mountain and Little Mountain. The stream then turns northeast for a few tenths of a mile before turning east-northeast. Several tenths of a mile downstream, it crosses Ridge Road and turns east-southeast, almost immediately reaching its confluence with Little Catawissa Creek.

Stony Run joins Little Catawissa Creek 1.96 miles (3.15 km) upstream of its mouth.

== Hydrology ==
Stony run experiences some form of pollution. The stream is also highly acidic because it has been significantly impacted by acid precipitation.

The pH of Stony Run is 6.0 and the concentration of alkalinity in the stream is 0 milligrams per liter. The water hardness of the stream is 0 milligrams per liter.

At 1:00 P.M. on July 1, 1997, the air temperature in the vicinity of Stony Run 1.14 miles (1.83 km) upstream of its mouth was 26 °C (79 °F). The water temperature of the stream at that location and time was 14.4 °C (57.9 °F). The specific conductivity of its waters is 19 umhos.

== Geography and geology ==
The elevation near the mouth of Stony Run is 912 feet (278 m) above sea level. The elevation of the source of the stream is between 1,460 feet (450 m) and 1,480 feet (450 m) above sea level.

Most of the length of Stony run is on rock of the Mauch Chunk Formation. However, the upper reaches of the creek are on rock of the Pocono Formation. The lower reaches of the stream are on Leck Kill soil and the rest of it is on Hazleton soil.

For approximately its lower half, Stony Run is flanked by areas that are prone to flooding during a 100-year flood.

Stony Run is a small stream, with a width of 1.7 metres (5.6 ft). It has a high gradient of 47.5 meters per kilometer.

== Watershed ==
The watershed of Stony Run has an area of 2.24 square miles (5.8 km^{2}). The vast majority of the watershed is in Union Township. However, a small portion of it is in Roaring Creek Township, in Columbia County. A very small part of the watershed is in North Union Township.

There is some club and association land in the upper and lower reaches of Stony Run. An area of land belonging to a Nature Conservancy Priority Forest Hub is located in the upper reaches of the watershed. The land in the watershed includes both forested land and agricultural land.

9 percent of the length of Stony Run is within 100 metres (330 ft) of road. 35 percent of the stream's length is within 300 metres (980 ft) of a road and 50 percent is within 500 metres (1,600 ft) of one. In 1990, the population density of the watershed was 40 people per square kilometer.

Stony Run is in the United States Geological Survey quadrangles of Shumans, Nuremberg, Ashland, and Shenandoah.

== Biology ==
Stony Run is considered by the Pennsylvania Department of Environmental Protection to be a Coldwater Fishery. A 1997 report advised against additional management actions on the stream due to low water quality and also suggested that the Pennsylvania Fish and Boat Commission not manage the stream for the same reason. The stream cannot support fish life due to the fact that it has been affected by acid precipitation.

A 1997 report stated that Stony Run was a poor site for angling.

== See also ==
- Trexler Run, next tributary of Little Catawissa Creek going upstream
