= Davis Run =

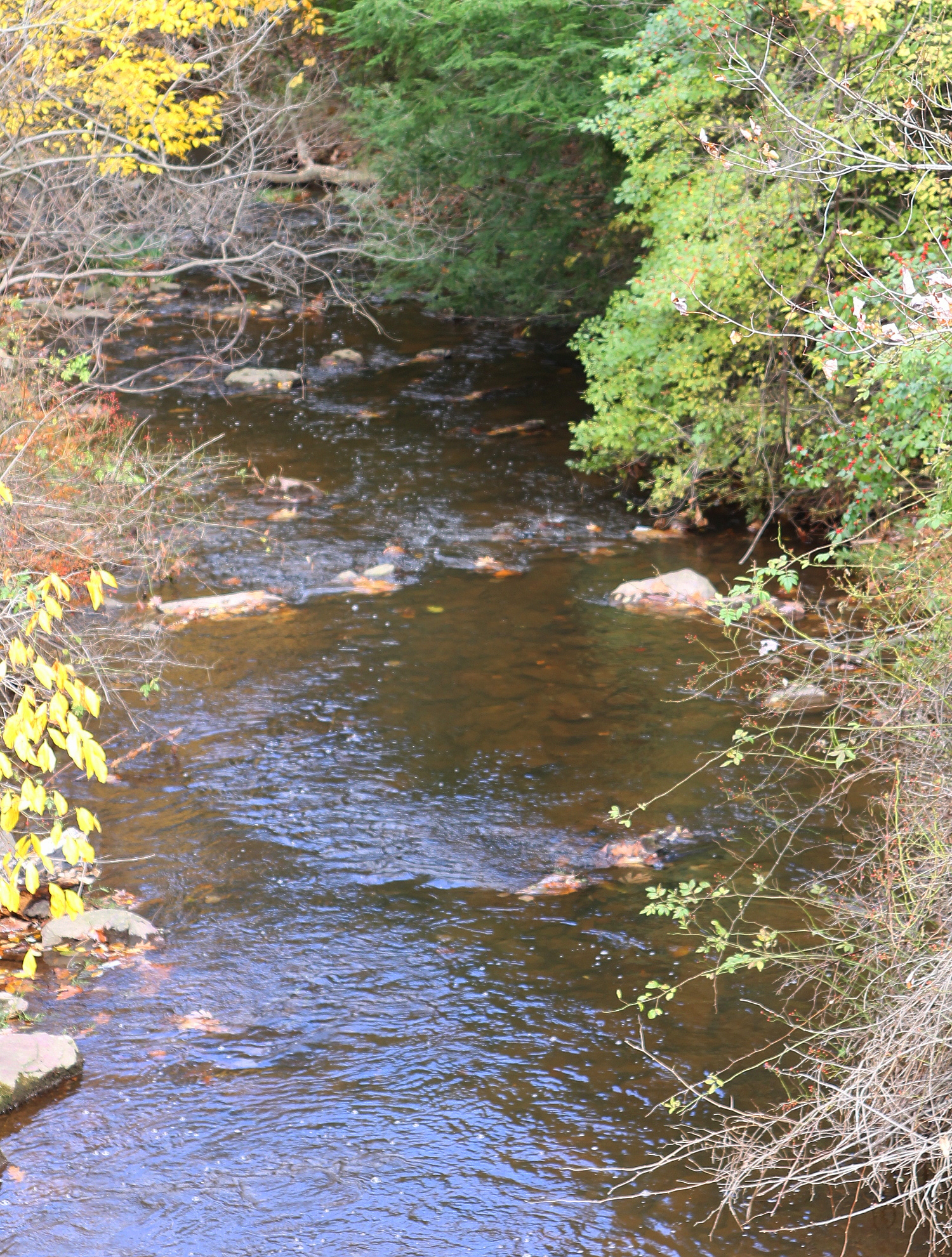
- Davis Run looking downstream a few hundred feet from its mouth

Physical characteristics
- Source
  - location: Locust Mountain on the southern edge of East Union Township, Schuylkill County, Pennsylvania
  - elevation: 1,280 to 1,300 feet (390 to 400 m)
- Mouth
  - location: Catawissa Creek in East Union Township, Schuylkill County, Pennsylvania
  - coordinates: 40°52′28″N 76°08′45″W
  - elevation: 971 ft (296 m)
- Length: 1.2 mi (1.9 km)
- Basin size: 2.86 mi^{2} (7.4 km^{2})

Basin features
- Progression: Catawissa Creek → Susquehanna River → Chesapeake Bay
- Tributaries
  - left: "Trib 27601 To Davis Run"
  - right: "Trib 27602 To Davis Run"

Davis Run is a tributary of Catawissa Creek in Schuylkill County, Pennsylvania, in the United States. It is approximately 1.2 miles (1.9 km) long. The watershed of the stream has an area of 2.86 square miles (7.4 km^{2}). The stream is considered to be a High-Quality Coldwater Fishery and Class A Wild Trout Waters. Six species of fish inhabit the stream, including brown trout and brook trout. The main rock formations in the stream's watershed are the Mauch Chunk Formation and the Pottsville Formation and the main soils are the Leck Kill soil and the Hezleton soil. The stream has two unnamed tributaries and a lake known as the Pumping Station Reservoir.

== Course ==
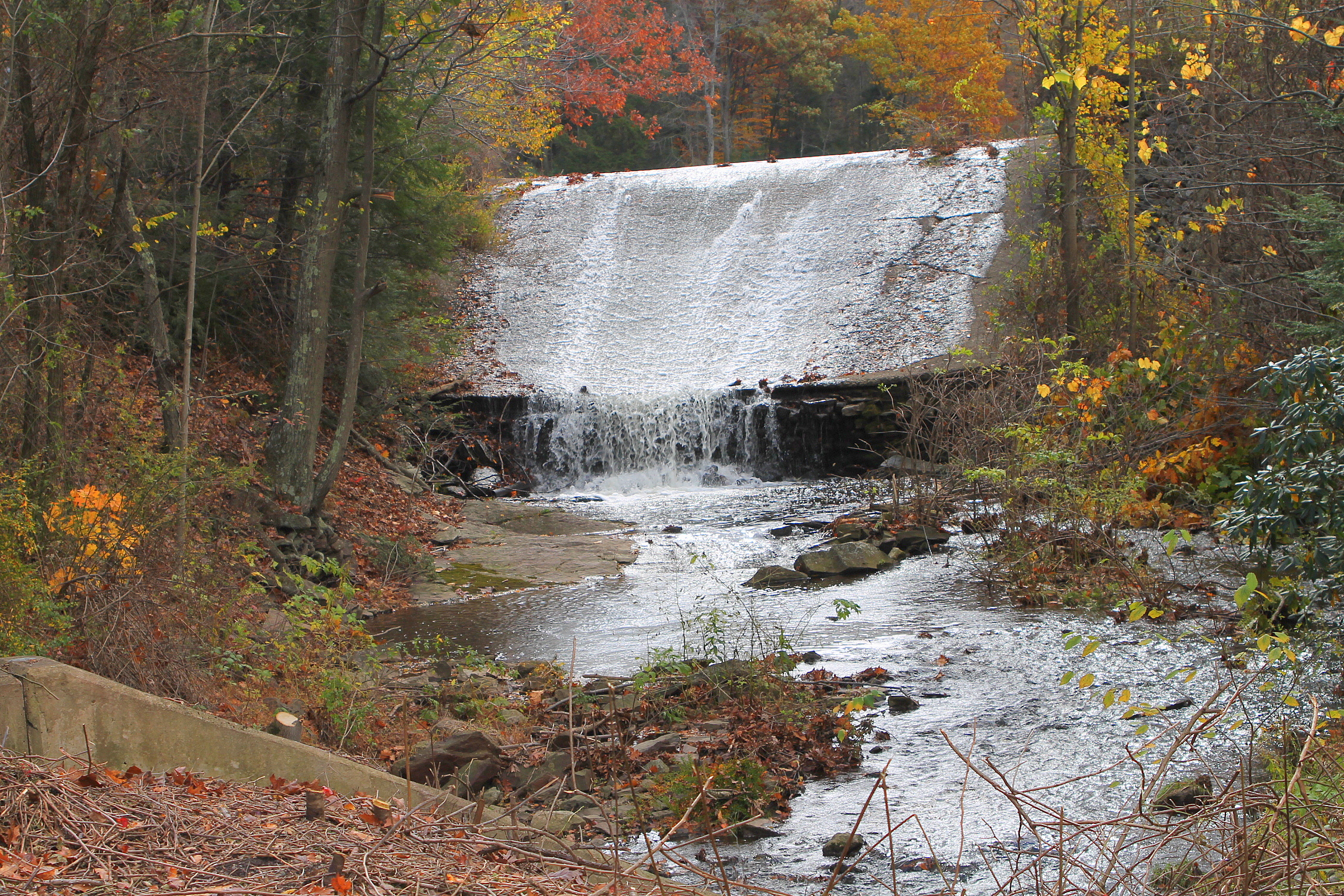
Davis Run looking upstream to the Pumping Station Dam

Davis Run begins on the northern edge of Locust Mountain on the southern edge of East Union Township. It flows north for several tenths of a mile before receiving an unnamed tributary and entering a valley. It then turns west for several hundred feet. The stream then turns north-northwest and enters the Pumping Station Reservoir after a few tenths of a mile. In this reservoir, it receives another unnamed tributary. The stream leaves its valley and turns north when it exits the reservoir. Approximately two-tenths of a mile further downstream, it reaches its confluence with Catawissa Creek.

Davis Run joins Catawissa Creek 30.56 miles (49.18 km) upstream of its mouth.

=== Tributaries ===
Davis Run has no named tributaries. However, it has two unnamed tributaries. They are known as "Trib 27602 To Davis Run" and Trib 27601 To Davis Run".

== Hydrology ==
Davis Run is an infertile stream. It has the potential to be affected by acid precipitation.

The pH of Davis Run is 6.6 and the concentration of alkalinity in the stream is 4 milligrams per liter. The alkalinity of the stream was measured using methyl orange by Graff in 1966 to be 17 milligrams per liter. This value was most likely downstream of the Pumping Station Reservoir, where chemical and biological processes increase the stream's alkalinity significantly. The total concentration of water hardness in the stream is 6 milligrams per liter. The specific conductivity of the stream's waters is 27 umhos.

== Geography and geology ==
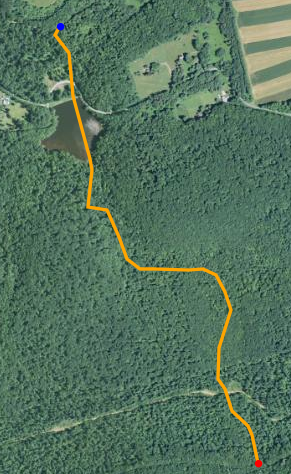
Satellite map of Davis Run. The red dot is the stream's source and blue dot is its mouth.

The elevation near the mouth of Davis Run is 971 feet (296 m) above sea level. The elevation of the stream's source is between 1,280 feet (390 m) and 1,300 feet (400 m).

Most of the watershed of Davis Run, including the entire length of the stream, is on rock of the Mauch Chunk Formation. This rock formation consists of siltstone, sandstone, grayish-red shale, and conglomerate. The upper reaches of the watershed have rock of the Pottsville Formation. The lower reaches of the watershed, including most of the stream's length, is on Leck Kill soil. The upper reaches of the watershed, including the stream's headwaters, are on Hazleton soil.

Davis Run is a small stream, with a width of 2.8 metres (9.2 ft). It has a high gradient of 52.3 meters per kilometer.

A mountain known as Locust Mountain is at the headwaters of Davis Run. The stream begins on the mountain's northern side.

There are almost no areas in the watershed of Davis Run that are prone to flooding during a 100-year flood.

== Watershed ==
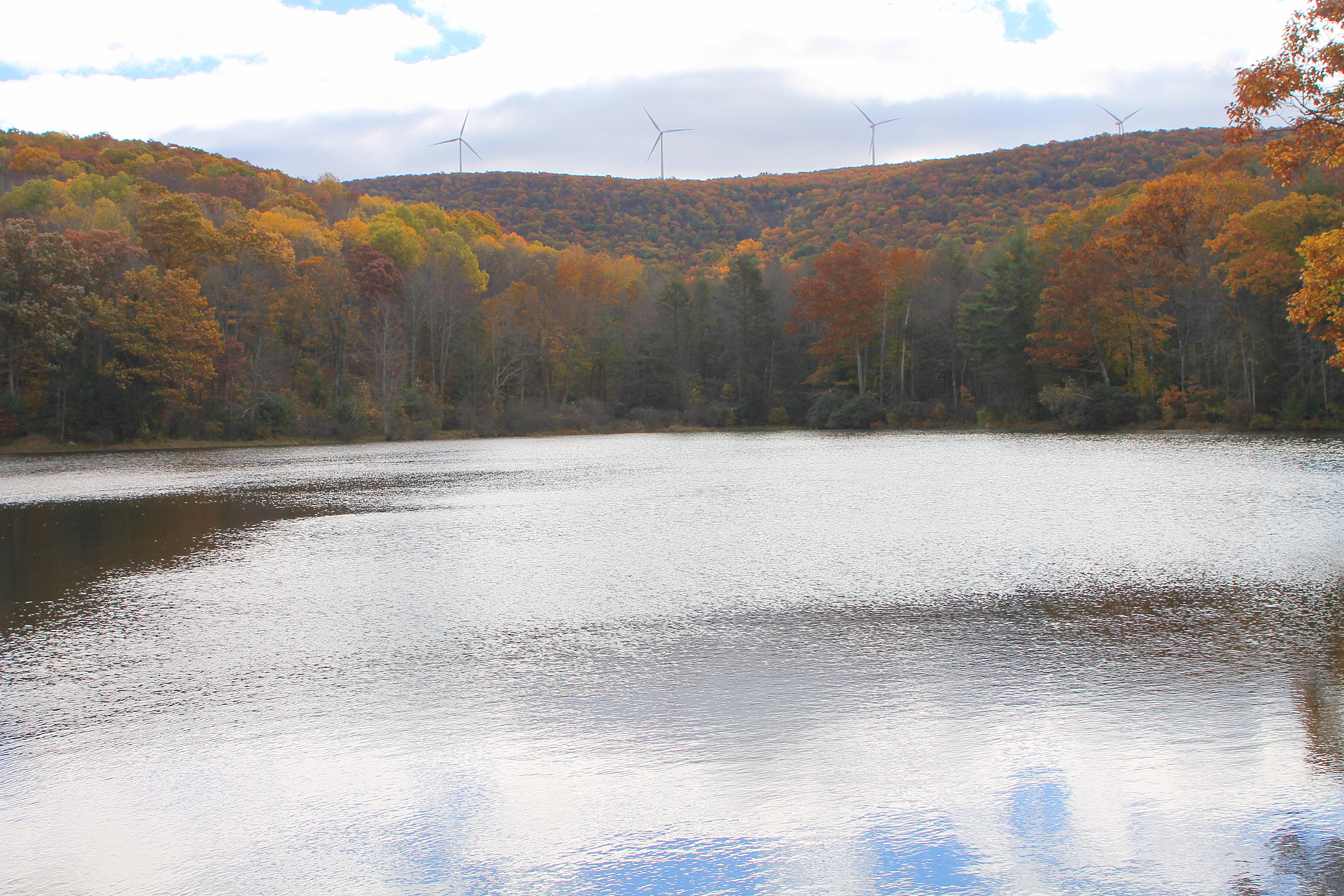
Pumping Station Reservoir from the north

The watershed of Davis Run has an area of 2.86 square miles (7.4 km^{2}). Much of the watershed is in East Union Township. However, a significant portion of the watershed is in Mahanoy Township. The northern and extreme southeastern parts of the watershed are in East Union Township and the southern part of the watershed is in Mahanoy Township. The stream is in the United States Geological Survey quadrangle of Shenandoah.

There is little agricultural activity in the watershed of Davis Run above the Pumping Station Reservoir. The geology of the watershed upstream of the reservoir is not fertile. Nearly all of the watershed consists of forested land. 6 percent of the stream's length is within 100 metres (330 ft) of a road and 31 percent is within 300 metres (980 ft) of a road. 48 percent of its length is within 500 metres (1,600 ft) of a road.

A reservoir known as the Pumping Station Reservoir is situated on Davis Run. The stream also has a dam known as the Pumping Station Dam.

In 1990, the population density of the watershed of Davis Run was 20 people per square kilometer.

== Biology ==
Davis Run is considered by the Pennsylvania Department of Environmental Protection to be a High-Quality Coldwater Fishery. It is considered by the Pennsylvania Fish and Boat Commission to be Class A Wild Trout Waters for both brook trout and brown trout. A 1997 report advised against stocking the stream.

As of 1997, Davis Run is one of two streams in the watershed of Catawissa Creek that has a substantial population of brown trout (the other being Trexler Run). A total of six species of fish inhabited the stream at that time. The biomass of wild trout was 48.30 kilograms per hectare, which included 23.49 kilograms per hectare of brook trout and 24.81 kilograms per hectare of brown trout. The brook trout in the stream ranged between 50 and 249 millimeters in length and the brown trout ranged from 25 to 324 millimeters in length and the brook trout ranged between 50 and 249 millimeters in length.

== Recreation ==
The Pumping Station Reservoir on Davis Run is used for recreational purposes. A 1997 report stated that the stream was an excellent site for angling.

== See also ==
- Rattling Run, next tributary of Catawissa Creek going downstream
- Messers Run, next tributary of Catawissa Creek going upstream
- List of tributaries of Catawissa Creek
