= Rattling Run (Catawissa Creek tributary) =

Tributary of Catawissa Creek in Schuylkill County, Pennsylvania

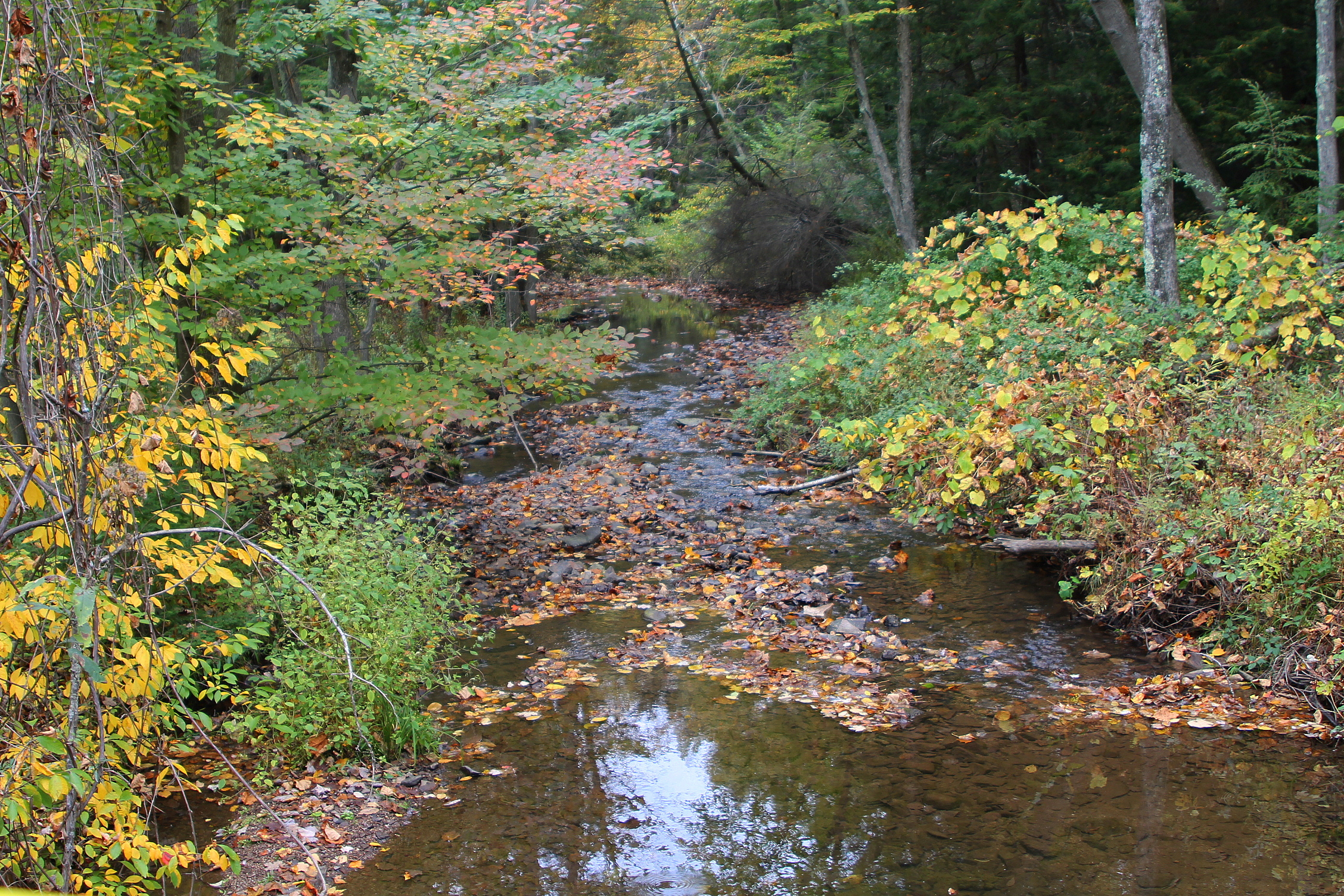
- Rattling Run looking downstream near its mouth

Physical characteristics
- Source
  - location: Southern border of Brandonville in East Union Township, Schuylkill County, Pennsylvania
  - elevation: 1,280 to 1,300 feet (390 to 400 m)
- Mouth
  - location: Catawissa Creek in East Union Township, Schuylkill County, Pennsylvania
  - coordinates: 40°51′59″N 76°11′41″W
  - elevation: 882 ft (269 m)
- Length: 2.4 mi (3.9 km)
- Basin size: 2.28 mi^{2} (5.9 km^{2})

Basin features
- Progression: Catawissa Creek → Susquehanna River → Chesapeake Bay
- Tributaries
  - left: "Trib 27595 To Rattling Run", "Trib 27594 To Rattling Run"

Rattling Run is a tributary of Catawissa Creek in Schuylkill County, Pennsylvania, in the United States. It is approximately 2.4 miles (3.9 km) long and flows through East Union Township. The watershed of the stream has an area of 2.28 square miles (5.9 km^{2}). The stream is considered to be a High-Quality Coldwater Fishery and Class A Wild Trout Waters. Three species of fish inhabit the stream. The main rock formations in the stream's watershed are the Mauch Chunk Formation and the Pottsville Formation and the main soils are the Leck Kill soil and the Hezleton soil. The stream has two unnamed tributaries.

== Course ==
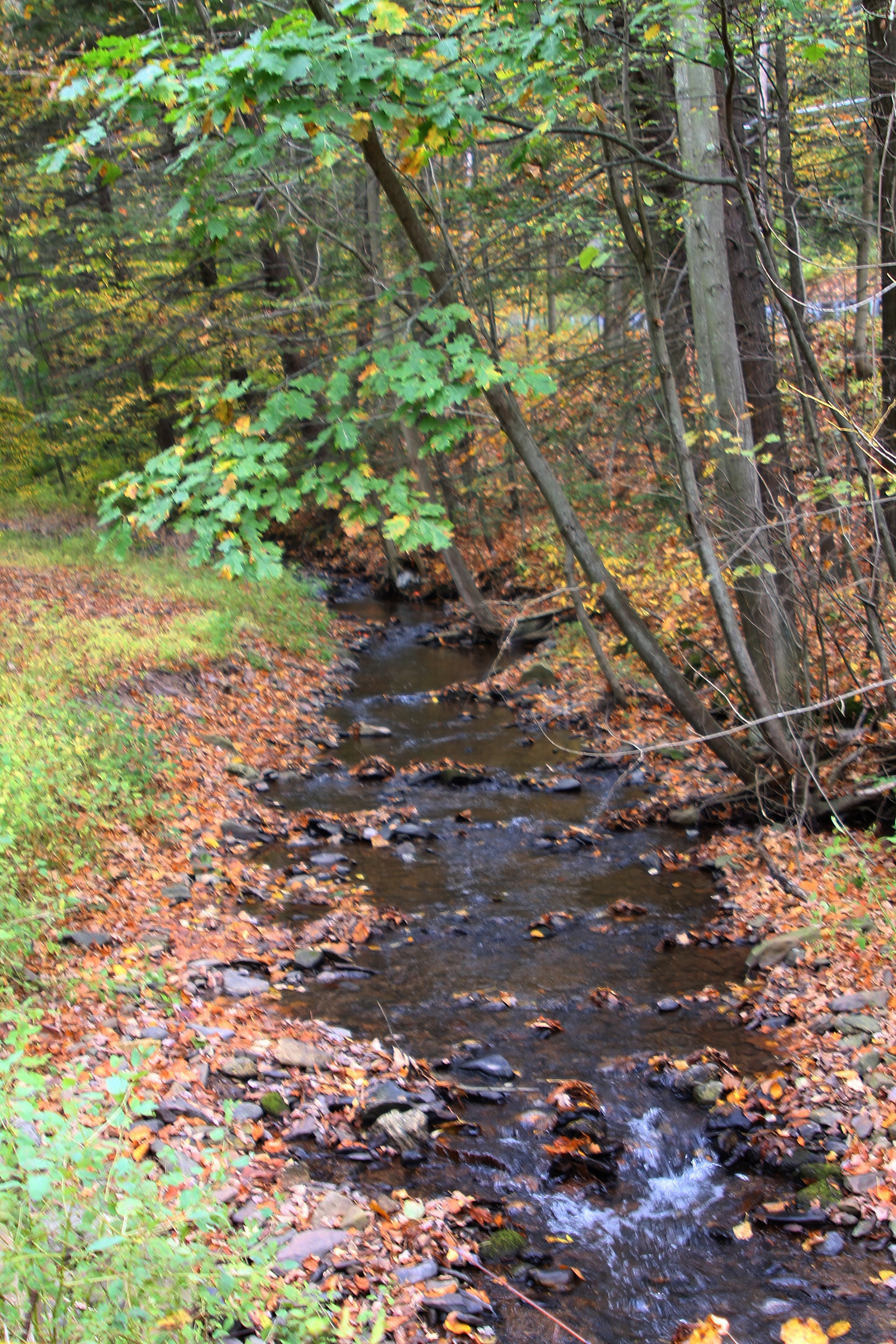
Rattling Run looking upstream near its mouth

Rattling Run begins on the southern border of Brandonville in East Union Township. It flows north and slightly west, reaching the central part of Brandonville after several tenths of a mile. It then turns west and slightly south and enters a valley. After more than a mile, the stream turns north-northwest and then north-northeast, crossing Pennsylvania Route 339. After crossing Pennsylvania Route 339, it turns west-northwest and reaches its confluence with Catawissa Creek after several tenths of a mile.

Rattling Run joins Catawissa Creek 26.32 miles (42.36 km) upstream of its mouth.

=== Tributaries ===
Rattling Run has no named tributaries. However, it does have two unnamed tributaries, known as "Trib 27594 To Rattling Run" and "Trib 27595 To Rattling Run".

== Hydrology ==
Rattling Run is infertile and acidic. It has the potential to be affected by acid precipitation.

The concentration of alkalinity in Rattling Run is 5 milligrams per liter. The pH of the stream is 6.6. Its total concentration of water hardness is 22 milligrams per liter.

At 11:31 A.M. on June 19, 1997, the air temperature in the vicinity of Rattling Run 0.57 miles (0.92 km) upstream of its mouth was 22 °C (72 °F). The water temperature of the stream at that time and place was 13.2 °C (55.8 °F). The specific conductivity of the waters of the stream is 81 umhos.

== Geography and geology ==
The elevation near the mouth of Rattling Run is 882 feet (269 m) above sea level. The elevation of the stream's source is between 1,280 feet (390 m) and 1,300 feet (400 m) above sea level.

Rattling Run flows over rock of the Mauch Chunk Formation for its entire length. This rock formation consists of siltstone, sandstone, grayish-red shale, and conglomerate. The Pottsville Formation is also found in the southern part of the watershed. The lower reaches of the watershed of the stream are on Leck Kill soil. The upper reaches are on Hazleton soil.

Rattling Run is a small stream, with a width of 3.0 metres (9.8 ft). It has a high gradient of 33.0 meters per kilometer.

There are few areas in the vicinity of Rattling Run that are prone to flooding during a 100 year flood. The valley of the stream is narrow and mostly forested.

== Watershed ==
The watershed of Rattling Run has an area of 2.28 square miles (5.9 km^{2}). Most of the watershed is in North Union Township, with a portion of it being in East Union Township. Smaller portions of the watershed are in Mahanoy Township and West Mahanoy Township.

Some agricultural land is located in the watershed of Rattling Run. There is a police station or fire station at the stream's headwaters. 25 percent of the stream's length is within 100 metres (330 ft) of a road and 42 percent is within 300 metres (980 ft) of one. 56 percent of the stream is within 500 metres (1,600 ft) of a road.

Rattling Run is in the United States Geological Survey quadrangle of Shenandoah.

== Biology ==
Rattling Run is considered by the Pennsylvania Department of Environmental Protection to be a High-Quality Coldwater Fishery, although it has not always had this designation but instead was considered to be a Coldwater Fishery in the past. Additionally, it is considered by the Pennsylvania Fish and Boat Commission to be Class A Wild Trout Waters.

Three species of fish inhabit Rattling Run. They are brook trout, eastern blacknose dace, and sculpins.

The biomass of wild brook trout in Rattling Run is 56.64 kilograms per hectare. This includes 35.30 kilograms per hectare of brook trout that are less than 175 millimeters long and 21.34 kilograms per hectare of brook trout that are more than 175 millimeters long. The brook trout in the stream range from 25 to 224 millimeters in length. There are 819 brook trout per kilometer that are less than 175 millimeters long and 94 per kilometer that are more than 175 millimeters long. There are 2729 brook trout per hectare that are less than 175 millimeters long and 314 per hectare that are more than 175 millimeters long.

A 1997 report stated that Rattling Run was an excellent site for angling.

== See also ==
- Dark Run, next tributary of Catawissa Creek going downstream
- Davis Run, next tributary of Catawissa Creek going upstream
- List of tributaries of Catawissa Creek
