= St. Paul's Union Church and Cemetery =

Historic site in Schuylkill County, Pennsylvania, US

- U.S. National Register of Historic Places
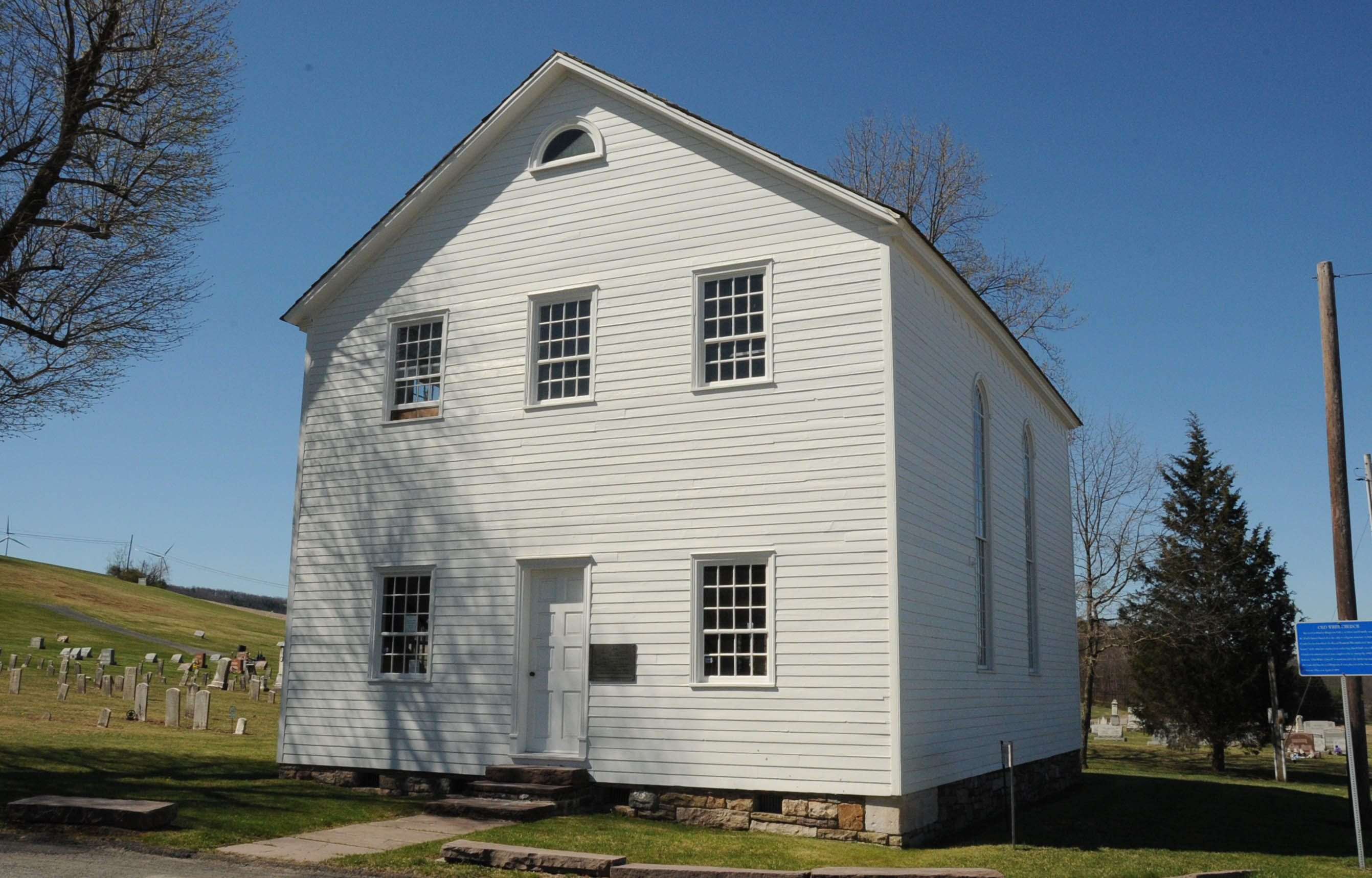
- Church in 2016

- Location within Pennsylvania Location within the United States
- Location: Junction of Township 798 and Legislative Route 4037, southwest corner, about 1 mile (1.6 km) east of Ringtown, Union Township, Pennsylvania
- Coordinates: 40°51′33″N 76°12′38″W
- Built: 1842
- Architectural style: Early 19th-Century Federal
- NRHP reference No.: 95000516
- Added to NRHP: April 27, 1995

St. Paul's Union Church and Cemetery, also known as the Old White Church and Cemetery, is a historic church and cemetery located at Union Township, Schuylkill County, Pennsylvania. The church was built in 1842, and is a two-story, wood-frame meeting house style building in a vernacular Federal style. It measures 30 feet, 8 inches, by 40 feet, 4 inches. The church was restored in 1990–1992. The adjacent cemetery includes a number of stone markers in German.

It was added to the National Register of Historic Places in 1995.
