= Ringtown, Pennsylvania =

Borough in Pennsylvania, US

- Borough
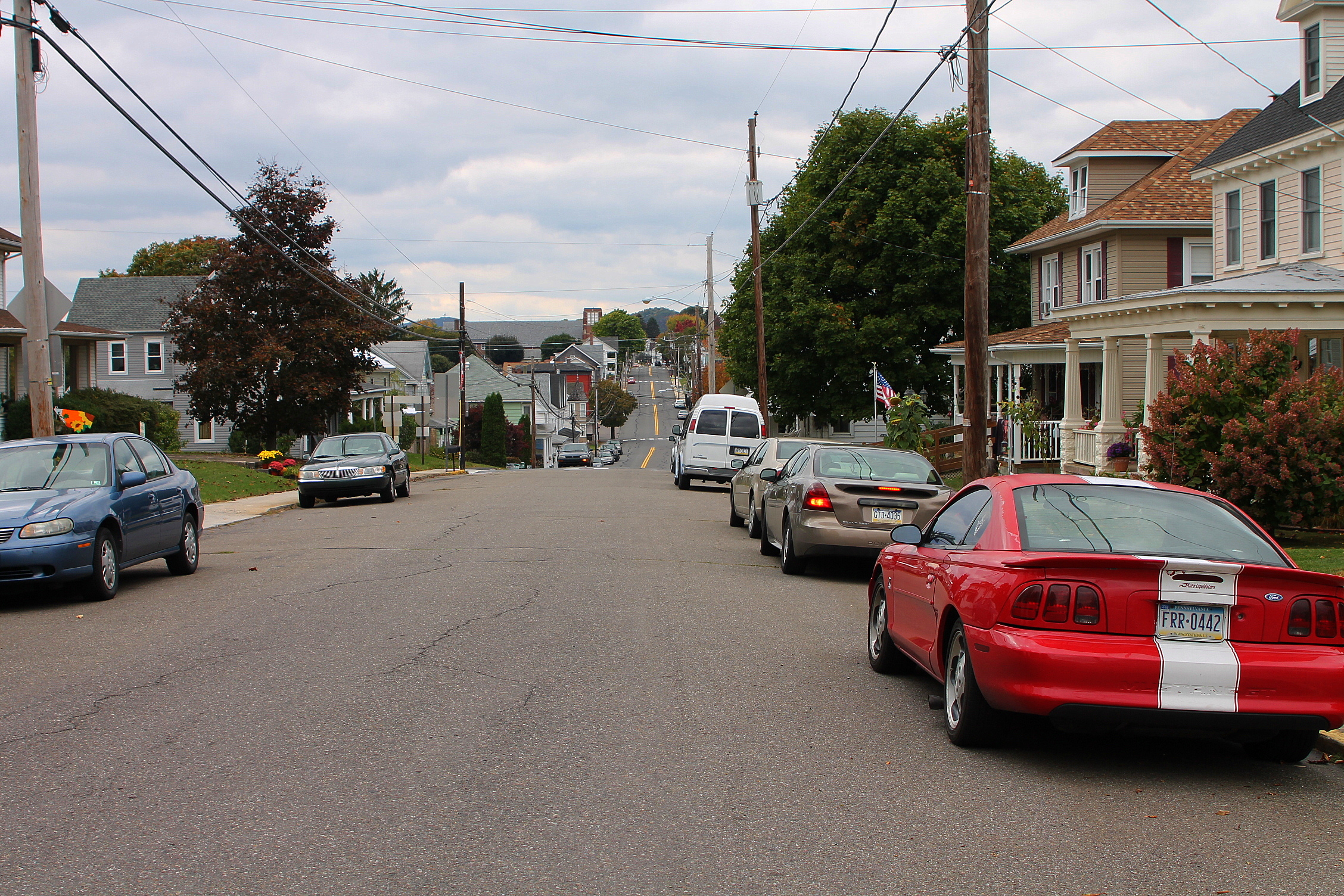
- Main Street in Ringtown, looking west

- Location of Ringtown in Schuylkill County, Pennsylvania.

- Location in Pennsylvania Ringtown (the United States)
- Coordinates: 40°51′27″N 76°14′01″W
- Country: United States
- State: Pennsylvania
- County: Schuylkill
- Settled: 1833
- Incorporated: 1909

Government
  - Type: Borough Council
  - Mayor: Albert Breznik

Area
  - Total: 0.44 sq mi (1.14 km^{2})
  - Land: 0.44 sq mi (1.14 km^{2})
  - Water: 0 sq mi (0.00 km^{2})

Population (2020)
  - Total: 721
  - Density: 1,644.6/sq mi (634.99/km^{2})
- Time zone: UTC-5 (Eastern (EST))
  - Summer (DST): UTC-4 (EDT)
- ZIP code: 17967
- Area code: 570
- FIPS code: 42-65000

Ringtown is a borough that is located in Schuylkill County, Pennsylvania, United States. As of the 2020 census, Ringtown had a population of 721. It is approximately five miles north to northwest of Shenandoah and seventeen miles west to southwest of Hazleton.

== Geography ==
Ringtown is located at 40°51′27″N 76°14′1″W (40.857604, −76.233718).

According to the United States Census Bureau, the borough has a total area of 0.4 square miles (1.0 km^{2}), all land.

== Demographics ==
Historical population
Census	Pop.	Note	%±
1910	723		—
1920	785		8.6%
1930	899		14.5%
1940	910		1.2%
1950	835		−8.2%
1960	849		1.7%
1970	880		3.7%
1980	837		−4.9%
1990	853		1.9%
2000	826		−3.2%
2010	818		−1.0%
2020	721		−11.9%
2021 (est.)	723	▲	0.3%

At the time of the 2000 census, there were 826 people, 319 households, and 231 families located in the borough.

The population density was 1,869.1 per square mile (721.7/km^{2}). There were 340 housing units at an average density of 769.4 per square mile (297.1/km^{2}).

The racial make-up of the borough was 98.79% White, 0.12% African American, 0.48% Asian and 0.61% from other races. Hispanic or Latino of any race were 0.61%.

Of the 319 households documented by the census, 30.4% had children who were under the age of eighteen living with them, 59.2% had married couples living together, 8.8% had a female householder with no husband present, and 27.3% had residents classified as non-families. Of all households, 23.2% were one-person households and 12.9% had one person living alone who was aged sixty-five or older.

The average household size was 2.59 and the average family size was 3.09.

The age distribution of residents documented by the census was 24.7% who were under the age of eighteen, 6.4% who were aged eighteen to twenty-four, 25.7% who were aged twenty-five to forty-four, 22.5% who were aged forty-five to sixty-four, and 20.7% who were aged sixty-five or older. The median age was thirty-nine years.

For every one hundred females, there were 89.4 males. For every one hundred females who were aged eighteen or older, there were 92.6 males.

The median household income was $36,563 and the median family income was $43,125. The median income for males was $32,685, as compared to $22,000 for females.

The per capita income was $20,345.

Approximately 2.6% of families and 4.6% of the population were living below the poverty line, including 4.4% of those who were under the age of eighteen and 11.2% of those who were aged sixty-five or older.

== Education ==
The school district is North Schuylkill School District.

== Notable person ==
- Danny Litwhiler, baseball player and coach
