= Union Township, Schuylkill County, Pennsylvania =

Township in Pennsylvania, US

Coordinates: 40°52′36″N 76°15′59″W

- Township
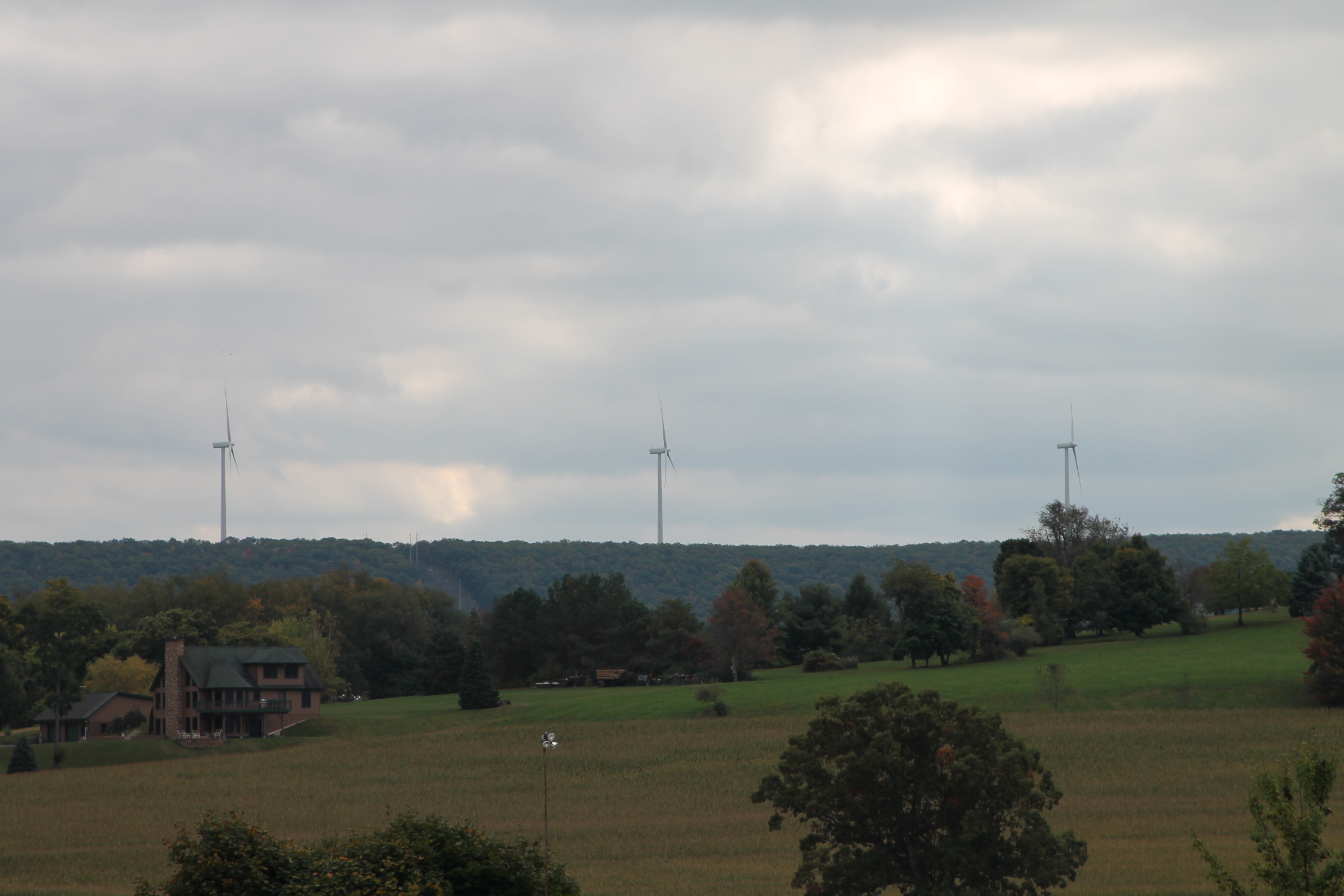
- Wind turbines in Union Township

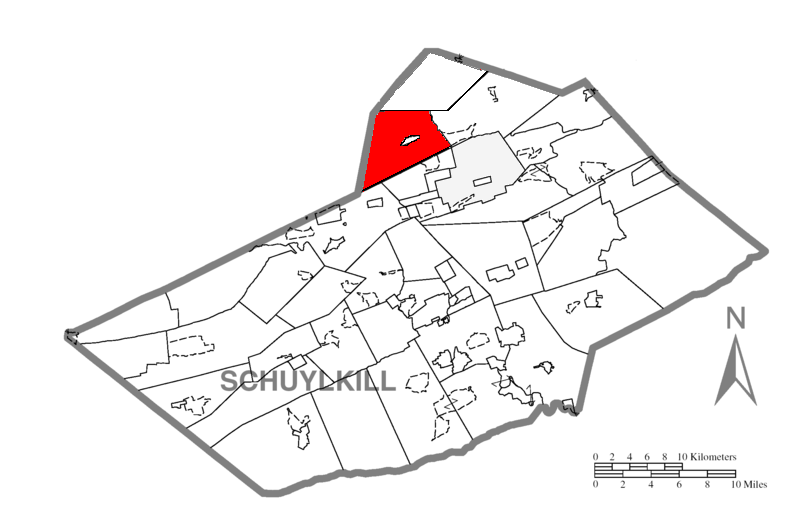
- Map of Schuylkill County, Pennsylvania Highlighting Union Township

- Map of Schuylkill County, Pennsylvania
- Country: United States
- State: Pennsylvania
- County: Schuylkill
- Settled: 1800
- Incorporated: 1818

Area
  - Total: 21.71 sq mi (56.22 km^{2})
  - Land: 21.54 sq mi (55.80 km^{2})
  - Water: 0.16 sq mi (0.42 km^{2})

Population (2020)
  - Total: 1,231 ▼
  - Estimate (2021): 1,231
  - Density: 57.1/sq mi (22.04/km^{2})
- Time zone: UTC-5 (Eastern (EST))
  - Summer (DST): UTC-4 (EDT)
- FIPS code: 42-107-78400

Union Township is a township that is located in Schuylkill County, Pennsylvania, United States. The population was 1,231 at the time of the 2020 census.

== History ==
The St. Paul's Union Church and Cemetery was added to the National Register of Historic Places in 1995.

== Geography ==
According to the U.S. Census Bureau, the township has a total area of 22.2 square miles (57.6 km^{2}), of which 22.1 square miles (57.1 km^{2}) is land and 0.2 square mile (0.4 km^{2}) (0.72%) is water.

== Demographics ==
Historical population
Census	Pop.	Note	%±
2010	1,273		—
2020	1,231		−3.3%
2021 (est.)	1,231		0.0%
U.S. Decennial Census

As of the census of 2000, there were 1,308 people, 529 households, and 363 families living in the township. The population density was 59.3 inhabitants per square mile (22.9/km^{2}). There were 598 housing units at an average density of 27.1 per square mile (10.5/km^{2}). The racial makeup of the township was 99.62% White, and 0.38% African American. Hispanic or Latino of any race were 0.92% of the population.

There were 529 households, out of which 30.6% had children under the age of 18 living with them, 56.5% were married couples living together, 7.4% had a female householder with no husband present, and 31.2% were non-families. 26.8% of all households were made up of individuals, and 13.8% had someone living alone who was 65 years of age or older. The average household size was 2.47 and the average family size was 3.01.

In the township the population was spread out, with 23.2% under the age of 18, 5.6% from 18 to 24, 26.7% from 25 to 44, 28.8% from 45 to 64, and 15.7% who were 65 years of age or older. The median age was 42 years. For every 100 females, there were 103.7 males. For every 100 females age 18 and over, there were 101.4 males.

The median income for a household in the township was $35,524, and the median income for a family was $44,286. Males had a median income of $31,964 versus $25,000 for females. The per capita income for the township was $17,773. About 4.2% of families and 6.9% of the population were below the poverty line, including 8.2% of those under age 18 and 7.1% of those age 65 or over.

== Gallery ==
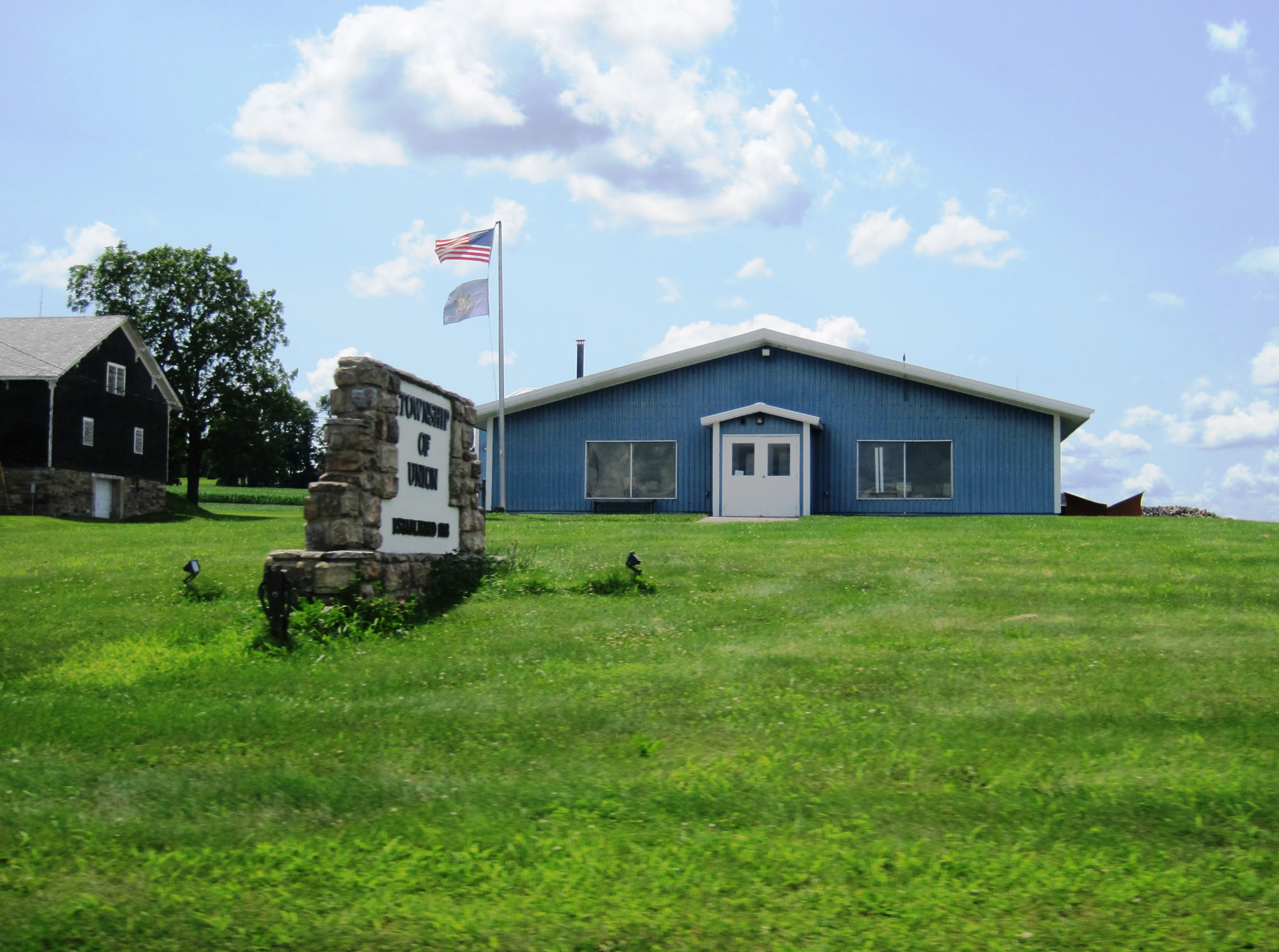
Town hall

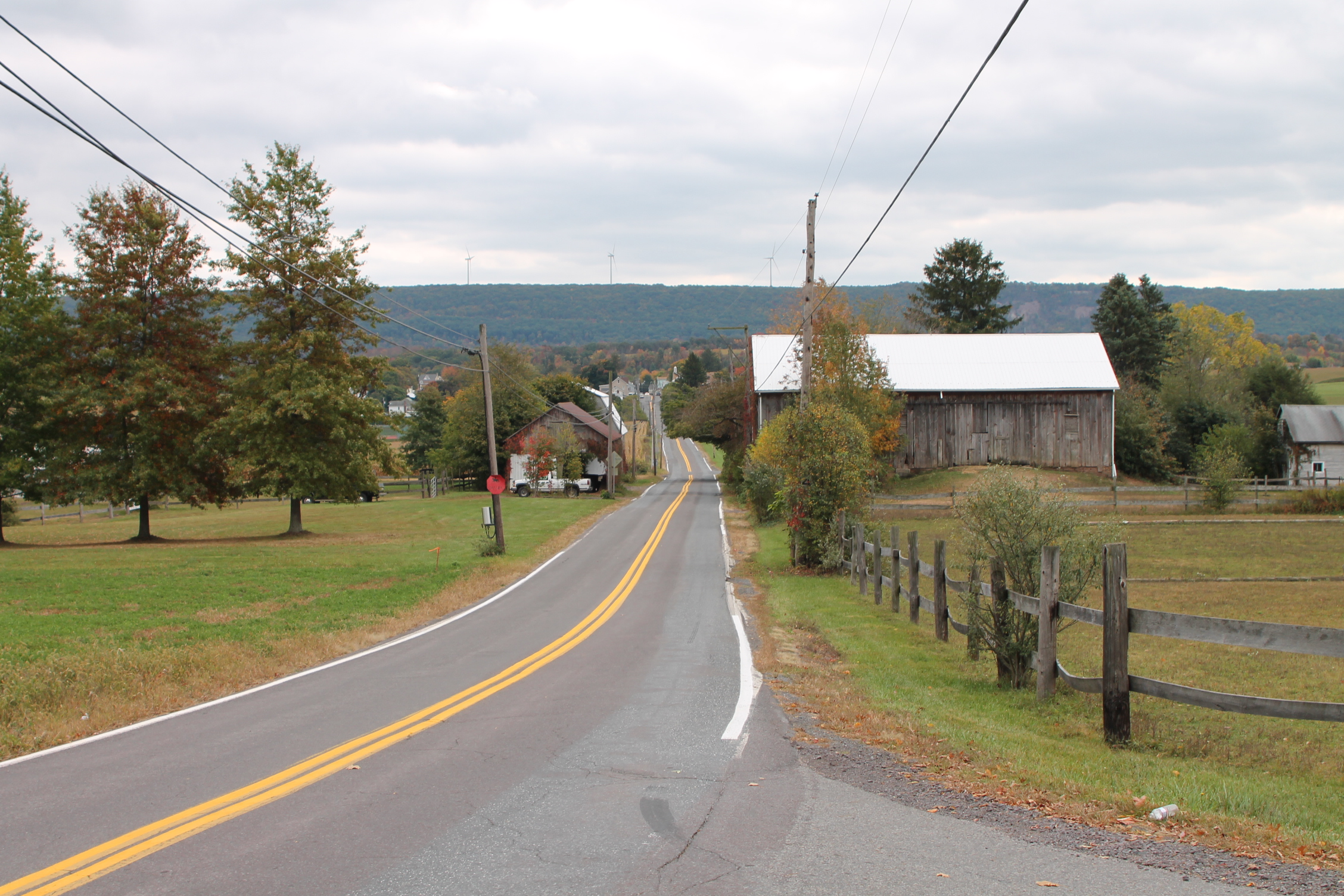
State Route 4033 looking south in Union Township

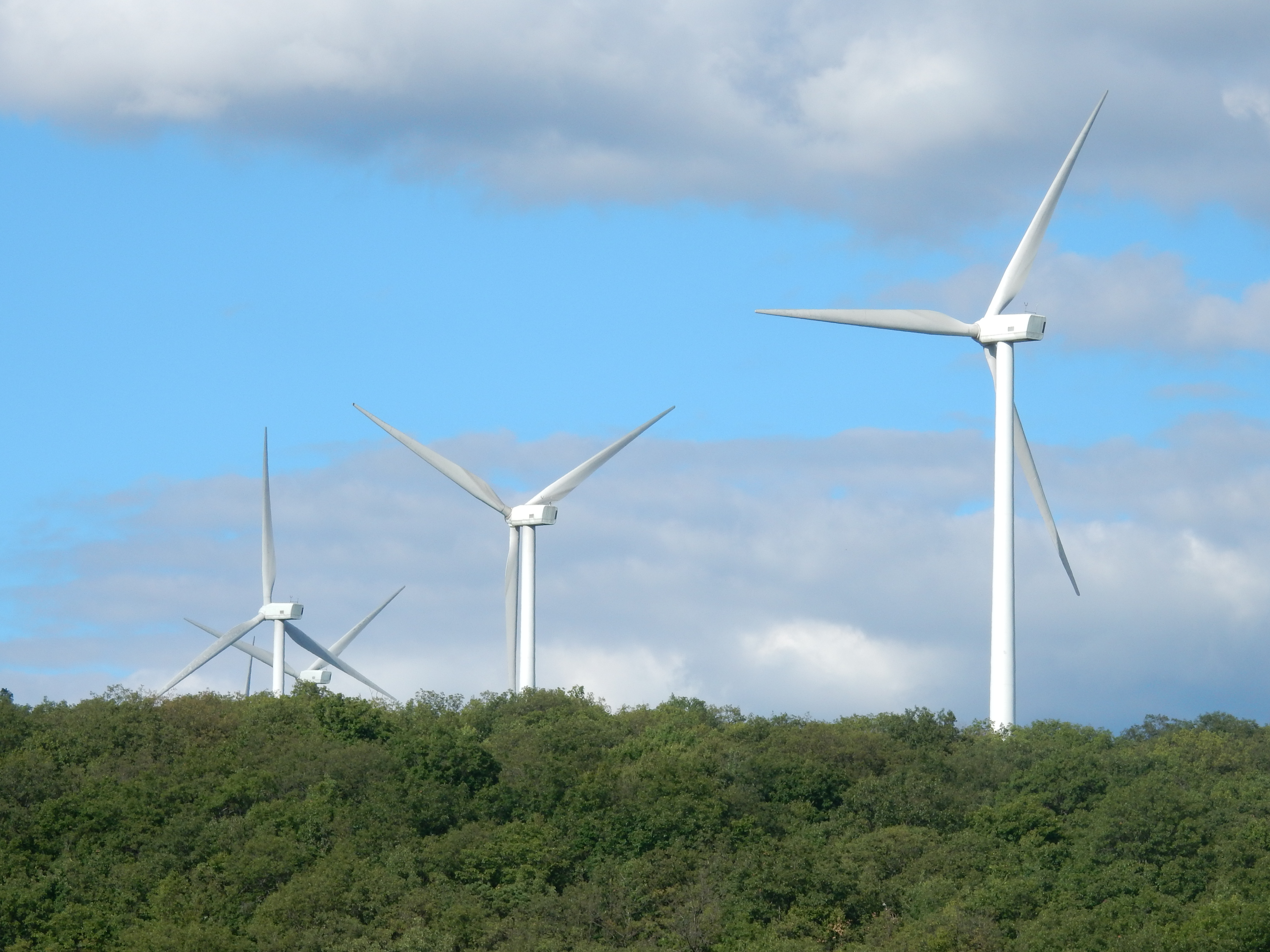
Wind Turbine Park
