= Delano (name) =

Delano is a surname and a given name. Notable people with the name include:

== People with the surname ==
- Adore Delano (born 1989), American drag queen, singer-songwriter and television personality
- Diane Delano (1957–2024), American actress
- Francis Roach Delano (1823–1887), American businessman and politician
- The Delano family, a prominent American political family including:
  - Columbus Delano (1809–1896), American congressman and government official
  - Francis R. Delano (1842–1892), American banker, prison warden and railroad superintendent
  - Frederic Adrian Delano (1863–1953), American railroad president, first Federal Reserve Vice Chairman
  - Gerald Curtis Delano (1890–1972), American painter
  - Jane Delano (1862–1919), American nurse
  - Paul Delano (1775–1842), U.S. sea captain, Commander in the Chilean Navy
  - Philip Delano (1603–1682), member of Plymouth Colony, North America
  - Sara Roosevelt nee Delano (1854–1941), mother of Franklin Delano Roosevelt
  - William Adams Delano (1874–1960), American architect of Delano & Aldrich
- Jack Delano (1914–1997), American photographer and composer
- Jamie Delano (born 1954), British comics writer
- Jon Delano (active 1980-present), journalist, professor at Carnegie Mellon University
- Lee Delano (1931–2017), American actor
- Michael DeLano (1940–2025), American actor and singer
- Warren Lyford DeLano (1972–2009), American advocate for open-source practices in sciences

== People with the given name ==
- Delano Burgzorg (born 1998), Nederlander football player
- Lano Hill (formerly Delano, born 1995), US American football player
- Delano Johnson (born 1988), US American football player
- Delano Ladan (born 2000), Nederlander football player
- Delano Lewis (1938–2023), American attorney, businessman and diplomat
- Delano Sam-Yorke (born 1989), English footballer
- Delano Seiveright, Jamaican politician
- Delano Stewart (born 1947), Jamaican singer
- Delano Thomas (born 1983), American indoor volleyball player
- Delano Williams (born 1993), British sprinter
- Delano E. Williamson (1822–1903), American politician, Indiana Attorney General

== People with the middle name ==
- Joan Aiken (Joan Delano Aiken) (1924–2004), British author
- Dési Delano Bouterse (born 1945), 8th President of Suriname
- Adrian Delano Dantley (born 1955), American basketball player
- J. Delano Ellis (1944–2020), American Pentecostal bishop and writer
- Franklin Delano Floyd (1943–2023), American murderer
- Tyrone Delano Gilliam Jr. (1966–1998), American murderer
- Ki-Jana Delano Hoever (born 2002), Nederlander football player
- Franklin Delano Roosevelt (1882–1945), 32nd president of the United States (1933–1945)
