= Delano family =

American family

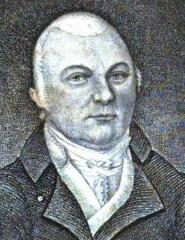
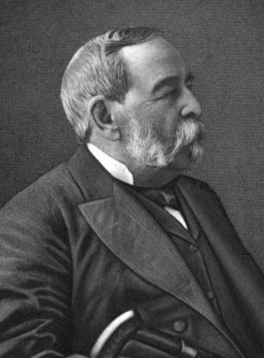
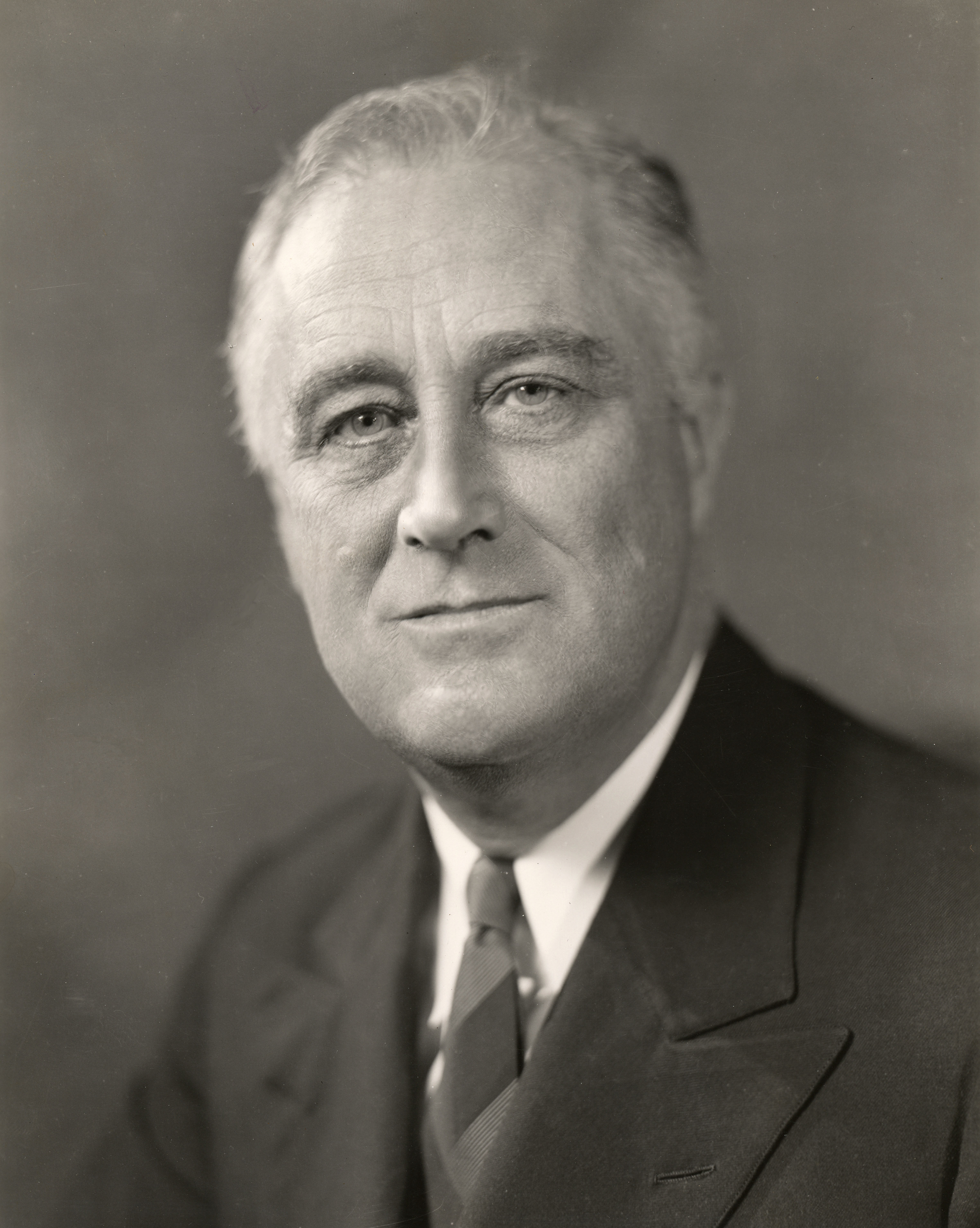
- Amasa Delano Warren Delano Jr. Franklin Delano Roosevelt Sr.
- Earlier spellings: de Lannoy, de La Noye
- Etymology: "of Lannoy"
- Origin: Walloon Flanders
- Founder: Philip Delano
- Connected families: Roosevelts

In the United States, members of the Delano family include U.S. presidents Franklin Delano Roosevelt, Ulysses S. Grant and Calvin Coolidge, astronaut Alan B. Shepard, and writer Laura Ingalls Wilder. Its progenitor is Philippe de Lannoy (1602–1681), a Pilgrim of Walloon descent, who arrived at Plymouth, Massachusetts, in the early 1620s. His descendants also include Eustachius De Lannoy (who played an important role in Indian history), Frederic Adrian Delano, Robert Redfield, and Paul Delano. Delano family forebears include the Pilgrims who chartered the Mayflower, seven of its passengers, and three signers of the Mayflower Compact.

== De Lannoy family in Europe ==
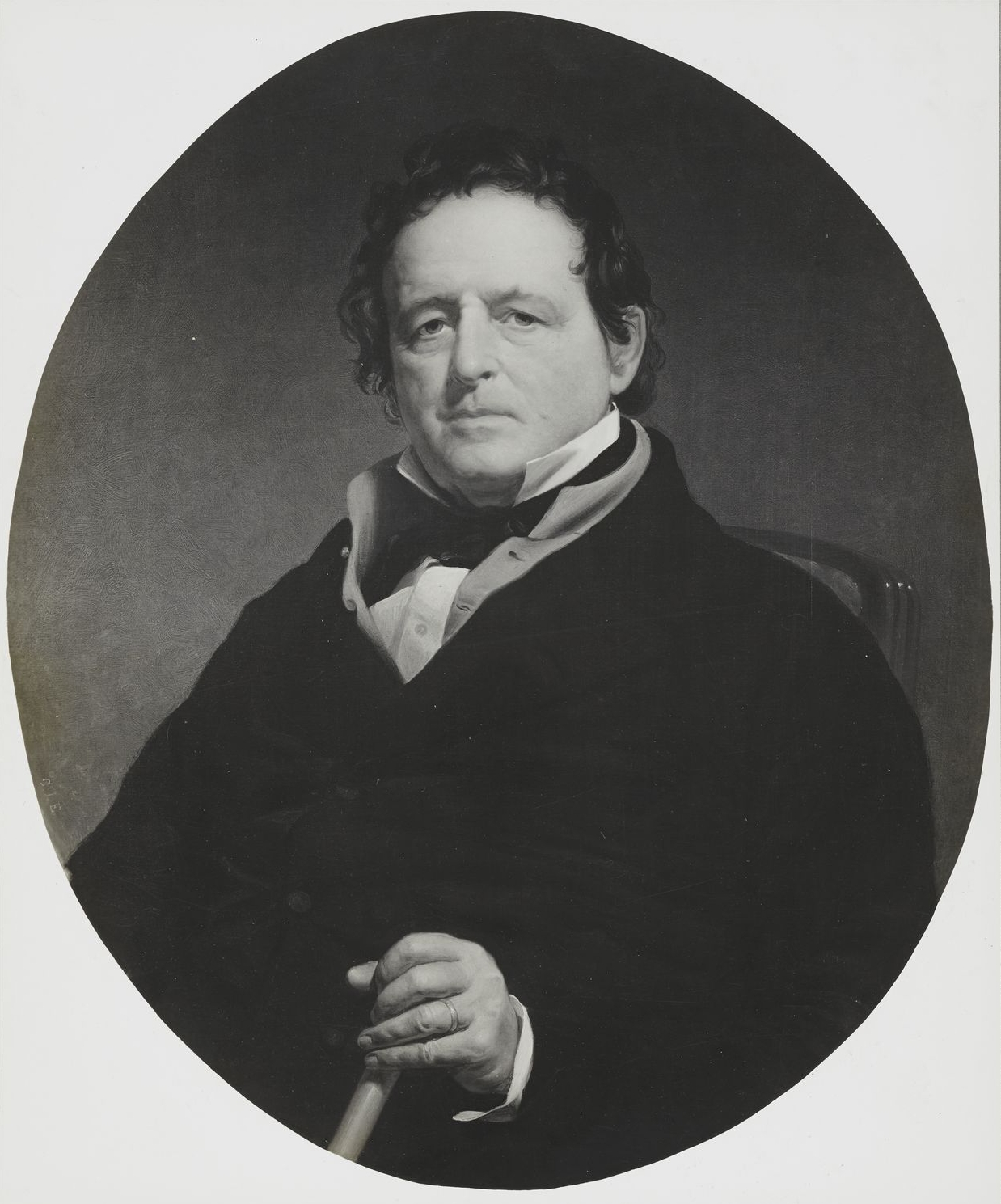
Captain Warren Delano Sr.

Philippe de Lannoy was baptized in Leiden on December 7, 1603. He was the son of religious refugee parents Jan Lano, born Jean de Lannoy in 1575 at Tourcoing; and Marie Mahieu of Lille, two towns in French-speaking Flanders, one of 17 provinces of the Spanish Netherlands. Today, this area is in northern France. Philip's parents were betrothed in the Leiden Walloon Church on January 13, 1596. His father died in 1604 at Leiden. Philippe's grandfather, Guilbert de Lannoy of Tourcoing, was born Roman Catholic but apparently became an early Protestant. He left the mainland with his family for England probably in the late 1570s and then, in 1591, moved to Leiden, a safe harbor for religious dissidents. The Mahieu family arrived in Leiden around the same time, having earlier been at Armentières, near Lille. The family name de Lannoy may derive from the town of Lannoy (that results from the agglutination of the definite article le "the" and annoy "alder plantation", Picard variant form corresponding to Modern French aulnaie "alder plantation") also near Lille.

Extensive research has found no evidence to connect the Delano family with the House of Lannoy.

=== Migration to America ===
Arriving in Leiden, Holland, from England, Philippe de Lannoy's ancestors affiliated with the Leiden Walloon Church, which held services in French. The timing and extent of his contact with the John Robinson Pilgrim congregation in Leiden is unknown but Philippe traveled to England and sailed to the new Plymouth Colony aboard Fortune in early July 1621, arriving on November 9, 1621.

=== Life in America ===
Philippe de Lannoy joined and resided with his uncle Francis Cooke and cousin John, who had arrived on the Mayflower the year before. In 1623, he received a land grant in Plymouth but sold this property in 1627 and moved to Duxborough. In 1634, at Plymouth, Massachusetts, he married Hester Dewsbury. Their children: 1. Mary Delano, b. abt 1635; 2. Philip Delano, b. abt 1637; 3. Hester or Esther Delano, b. abt 1640; 4. Thomas Delano, b. 21 March 1642; 5. John Delano, b. 1644; 6. Jonathan Delano, b. 1647–1648, prob. Duxbury, Massachusetts. Delano prospered and was part of the group that organized the construction of highways and bridges around the village. Hester died after 1648. Before 1653 he married the widowed Mary Pontus Glass, b. abt 1625, by whom he had three children: 1. Jane Delano; 2. Rebecca Delano; 3. Samuel Delano.

He volunteered to serve in the Pequot War of 1637, but news soon arrived that Connecticut and Massachusetts Bay men had extinguished the threat, and Plymouth men stayed home. In 1652, he was one of 36 Purchasers of the Dartmouth territory, about 115,000 acres purchased from Massasoit, the leader of the Wampanoag. Philippe's share amounted to 800 acres. He sold half of his share to William Earle in 1659 and the other half to John Russell, Sr. in 1667. Philip also owned land in Bridgewater and Middleborough. Philip died in Duxbury sometime between 22 August 1681 and 4 March 1681/82. He was 79. A great many of his offspring would become prominent mariners, whalers, and shipbuilders. The later commercial success of some Delanos was such that they would become part of the Massachusetts aristocracy, sometimes referred to as one of the Boston Brahmins (the "First Families of Boston").

== Descendants ==
Philippe de Lannoy's sixth child Jonathan (about 1648–1720) married Mercy Warren, granddaughter of Mayflower passenger Richard Warren; among their direct descendants are the author Laura Ingalls Wilder, President Ulysses S. Grant, President Calvin Coolidge, anthropologist Robert Redfield, astronaut Alan B. Shepard, journalist Hunter S. Thompson, entertainer Martina McBride and the poet Conrad Potter Aiken.

Over time, family members migrated to other states, including Pennsylvania, Utah, Georgia, Michigan, Maine, New York, Ohio, Oklahoma, Virginia, Vermont and as far away as Chile, where today descendants of Captain Paul Delano are numerous and prominent. From the New York clan, Sara Delano married James Roosevelt I and their only child, Franklin Delano Roosevelt, became President of the United States.

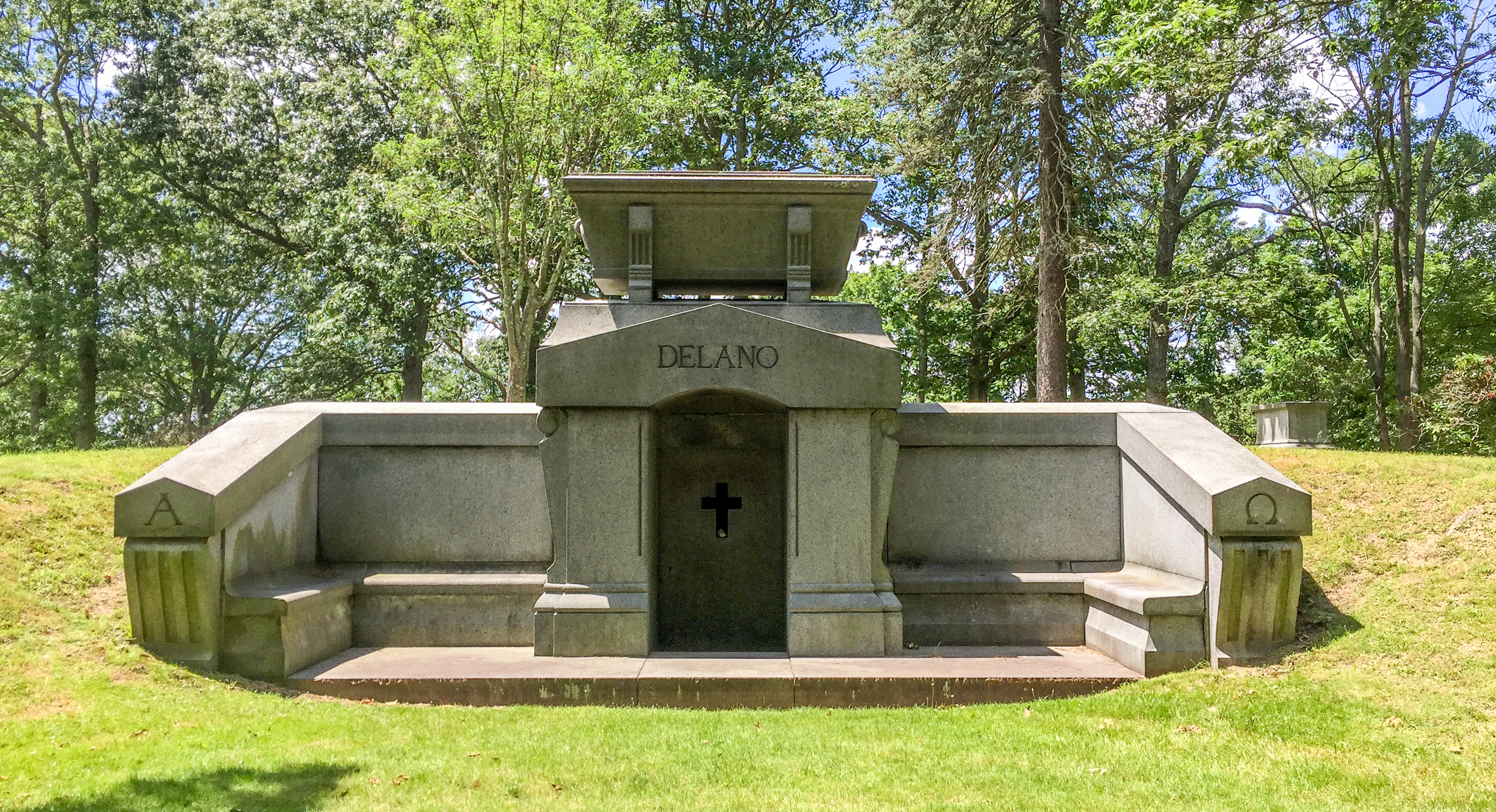
Delano Family Tomb in Riverside Cemetery in Fairhaven, Massachusetts

Delano family in America

- Amasa Delano (1763–1823), master mariner, shipbuilder and author Amasa Delano was a 19th-century American sea captain and trader who is best known for his role in several maritime adventures, including an encounter with a group of shipwrecked slaves that later became the basis for a famous novella. Amasa Delano was born on February 22, 1763, in Duxbury, Massachusetts, USA. He came from a seafaring family and grew up with a strong connection to the maritime world. Delano began his maritime career as a sailor, eventually rising through the ranks to become a ship captain.He engaged in various trading voyages and was involved in the lucrative sealing industry, which involved hunting seals for their valuable fur and oil in remote regions, including the South Pacific and South America. One of the most notable events in Delano's life occurred in 1805 when he encountered the Spanish schooner Tryal near the coast of Chile. Delano's ship, the Perseverance, came across the Tryal, which appeared to be in distress. Delano boarded the Spanish vessel to offer assistance. What he found was a grim scene. The Tryal was a slave ship, and the slaves on board had revolted against their captors. Delano and his crew were initially unaware of this fact. Delano and some of his crew were eventually taken captive by the rebelling slaves, but they managed to escape. Delano later returned with reinforcements and subdued the revolt. This incident and Delano's account of it became the basis for Herman Melville's novella "Benito Cereno", which was published in 1855. After his maritime adventures, Amasa Delano returned to the United States. He continued to be involved in the shipping and trading business. Amasa Delano died on May 13, 1823, in Fairhaven, Massachusetts.
- Paul Delano (1775–1842), Commander of the Chilean Department of the Navy
- Columbus Delano (1809–1896), a statesman, lawyer, rancher, banker, U.S. Congressman from Ohio, Whig/Republican Party member. Advocated for federal rights for African-Americans and protection under federal government occupation of the South. U.S. Secretary of the Interior in the Grant administration. In 1874 demanded Yellowstone be federally protected. In 1875 under a cloud of corruption during his tenure, President U.S. Grant, a cousin, demanded his resignation. He returned to Ohio as a farmer and lawyer; later a town in California was named for him.
- Warren Delano Jr. (1809–1898), a grandfather of President Franklin D. Roosevelt and Chief of Operations of Russell & Company, whose business included the opium trade in Canton.
- Franklin Hughes Delano (1813–1893), a merchant and diplomat (husband of Laura Astor, favorite granddaughter of John Jacob Astor)
- Francis Ralph Delano, (1842–1892), banker, railroad executive
- Warren Delano IV (1852–1920), a coal magnate and horseman
- Sara Ann Delano (1854–1941), mother of Franklin Delano Roosevelt
- Jane Arminda Delano (1862–1919), a registered nurse (RN), founder of the American Red Cross Nurses Service; died in Lille, France, a victim of the Spanish flu pandemic, which she was in service to try to stop
- Frederic Adrian Delano II, (1863–1953), civil engineer, member of the Commercial Club of Chicago, brother of Sara
- William Adams Delano (1874–1960), an architect
- Franklin Delano Roosevelt (1882–1945), 32nd President of the United States
- Warren Delano Robbins (1885–1935), a diplomat
- Preston Delano (1886–1961), U.S. Comptroller of the Currency, 1938-1953
- David Delano Clark (1924–1997), a nuclear physicist
- Diane Delano (1957-2024), an actress
- James Whitlow Delano (born 1960), a photographer
- Mary Gray-Reeves (daughter of Florence Delano Gray) (born 1962), first woman to be an Episcopal bishop in California.
- Jack Houghteling (great-great-grandson of Frederic Adrian Delano) (born 1991), novelist

Delano family namesakes

- Delano, California, named for Columbus Delano
- Delano, Minnesota, named for Francis Roach Delano
- Delano, Pennsylvania, and Delano Township, Pennsylvania, named for Warren Delano Jr.
- Delano Hall, the main dining facility for midshipmen at the United States Merchant Marine Academy, is named in honor of the Delano family for its support of the American Merchant Marine in general, and President F.D. Roosevelt's support for the Academy in particular.

=== Warren Delano Jr.'s career smuggling opium into China ===
Warren Delano Jr. made a large fortune trading opium in Canton (now Guangzhou), China. Delano first went to China at age 24 to work for Russell & Company, which had pioneered trading with China. John Perkins Cushing – also a Russell & Company partner – had preceded Delano and initiated a close relationship with a Chinese official called Howqua. The two men had established an offshore base – an anchored floating warehouse – where Russell & Company ships would offload their opium contraband before continuing up the Pearl River Delta to Canton with their legal cargo.

By early 1843, Delano had spent a momentous decade in the China trade. He had achieved his financial competence and risen to become the head partner of the biggest American firm dealing with China. He had witnessed the destruction of the hated Canton system, the humiliation of the Chinese government, and the creation of New Chinas.
