= Francis Delano =

Francis Delano may refer to:

- Francis R. Delano (1842–1892), American banker
- Francis Roach Delano (1823–1887), American businessman and politician.
