= Negro Hollow =

Coordinates: 40.8696°N 76.0885°W

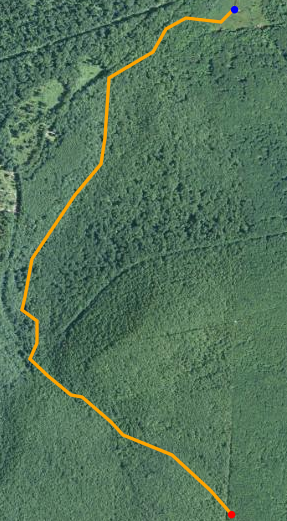

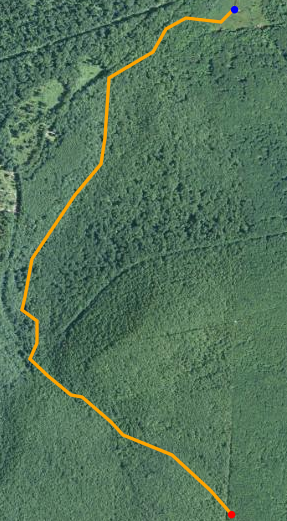
- Satellite map of Negro Hollow. The red dot is the stream's source and blue dot is its mouth.

Physical characteristics
- Source
  - location: Bears Head in Delano Township, Pennsylvania
  - elevation: 1,800 ft (550 m)
- Mouth
  - location: Messers Run in East Union Township, Schuylkill County, Pennsylvania
  - elevation: 1,128 ft (344 m)
- Length: 1.7 mi (2.7 km)
- Basin size: 1.57 sq mi (4.1 km^{2})

Basin features
- Progression: Messers Run → Catawissa Creek → Susquehanna River → Chesapeake Bay
- Tributaries
  - left: "Trib 27607 To Negro Hollow"

Negro Hollow (also known as Negro Hollow Run) is the only named tributary of Messers Run in Schuylkill County, Pennsylvania, in the United States. It is approximately 1.7 miles (2.7 km) long and flows through Delano Township, Kline Township, and East Union Township. The watershed of the stream has an area of 1.57 square miles (4.1 km^{2}). The stream is considered to be a High-Quality Coldwater Fishery and Class A Wild Trout Waters. Two species of fish inhabit the stream, including brook trout. The main rock formations in the stream's watershed are the Mauch Chunk Formation and the Pottsville Formation and the main soils are the Leck Kill soil and the Hezleton soil. The stream has one unnamed tributary.

== Course ==
Negro Hollow begins on a mountain known as Bears Head in Delano Township. It flows northwest for several tenths of a mile, entering a valley. The stream then receives an unnamed tributary and turns north for several hundred feet, flowing through another valley. It enters Kline Township and turns north-northeast for several tenths of a mile, entering East Union Township. The stream then turns east-northeast for a few tenths of a mile and reaches its confluence with Messers Run near the Blue Head Reservoir.

Negro Hollow joins Messers Run 0.80 miles (1.29 km) upstream of its mouth.

=== Tributaries ===
Negro Hollow has no named tributaries. However it has one unnamed tributary. It is known as "Trib 27607 To "Negro Hollow"". This tributary flows through Mahanoy Township and Delano Township.

== Hydrology ==
Negro Hollow is an infertile and acidic stream. It has the potential to be affected by acid precipitation.

The pH of Negro Hollow is 6.6. The concentration of alkalinity in the stream is 4 milligrams per liter. The total concentration of water hardness is 7 milligrams per liter.

At 12:20 P.M. on July 22, 1997, the air temperature in the vicinity of Negro Hollow 0.28 miles (0.45 km) upstream of its mouth was 23 °C (73 °F). The water temperature of the stream at this time and location was 14.2 °C (57.6 °F). The specific conductivity of the stream's waters is 20 micromhos.

== Geography and geology ==
The elevation near the mouth of Negro Hollow is 1,128 feet (344 m) above sea level. The elevation of the stream's source is approximately 1,800 feet (550 m) above sea level.

The lower reaches of the watershed of Negro Hollow are on rock of the Mauch Chunk Formation. This rock formation consists of siltstone, sandstone, grayish-red shale, and conglomerate. This rock formation is also present in some areas in the upper reaches of the watershed. However, rock of the Pottsville Formation is also present in this part of the watershed. This rock formation contains claystone, limestone, conglomerate, shale, and gray sandstone.

The lower reaches of the watershed of Negro Hollow are on Leck Kill soil. However, the rest of the watershed is on Hazleton soil.

Negro Hollow is a small stream, with a width of 2.8 metres (9.2 ft). It has a high gradient of 64.8 meters per kilometer.

The middle reaches of Negro Hollow are surrounded by land that is prone to flooding during a 100-year flood. The tributary "Trib 27607 To "Negro Hollow"" is surrounded by such land for nearly its entire length, as is its own unnamed tributary.

There are Pennsylvania State Game Lands roads in the watershed of Negro Hollow. However, these roads are closed for much of the year. None of the stream's length is within 100 metres (330 ft) of a road. However, 51 percent of its length is within 300 metres (980 ft) of a road and 78 percent of its length is within 500 metres (1,600 ft) of a road. In 1990, the population density of the stream's watershed was 31 people per square kilometer.

A mountain known as Locust Mountain is in the watershed of Negro Hollow.

== Watershed and history ==
The watershed of Negro Hollow has an area of 1.57 square miles (4.1 km^{2}). The watershed occupies portions of four townships. Much of the watershed is in Delano Township, but significant portions are also in East Union Township and Mahanoy Township. A smaller part of the watershed is in Kline Township. The watershed is part of the Lower North Branch Susquehanna drainage basin.

There is some land belonging to a Nature Conservancy Priority Forest Hub in the eastern part of the watershed of Negro Hollow. The lower reaches of the watershed are in Pennsylvania State Game Lands Number 308. Nearly all of the watershed is forested.

Negro Hollow is in the United States Geological Survey quadrangle of Delano.

Negro Hollow was used as a water supply for Mahanoy City in the early 1900s. The water was supplied by the Mahanoy City Water Company. It was accessed via gravity and pumping.

Negro Hollow was formerly known as Nigger Hollow.

== Ecology ==
Negro Hollow is considered by the Pennsylvania Department of Environmental Protection to be a High-Quality Coldwater Fishery, as is the tributary "Trib 27607 To "Negro Hollow"". Negro Hollow itself is also considered by the Pennsylvania Fish and Boat Commission to be Class A Wild Trout Waters for brook trout between its headwaters and its mouth.

Two species of fish inhabit Negro Hollow: brook trout and sculpins. The biomass of wild brook trout in the stream is 55.77 kilograms per hectare, including 47.29 kilograms per hectare of brook trout less than 175 millimeters long and 8.48 kilograms per hectare of brook trout more than 185 millimeters long. The trout range in from 25 to 249 millimeters in length.

There are 1950 brook trout per kilometer in Negro Hollow that are less than 175 millimeters long. There are 32 brook trout per kilometer that are more than 175 millimeters long. The stream has 7315 brook trout per hectare that are less than 175 millimeters long and 120 brook trout per hectare that are more than 175 millimeters long.

A 1997 report stated that Negro Hollow was a good site for angling.

A number of bird species also inhabit the area near Negro Hollow. These include American robins, hermit thrushes, Cooper's hawks, winter wrens, and pileated woodpeckers. American robins are especially common near the stream.
