= Messers Run =

Tributary river in eastern Pennsylvania

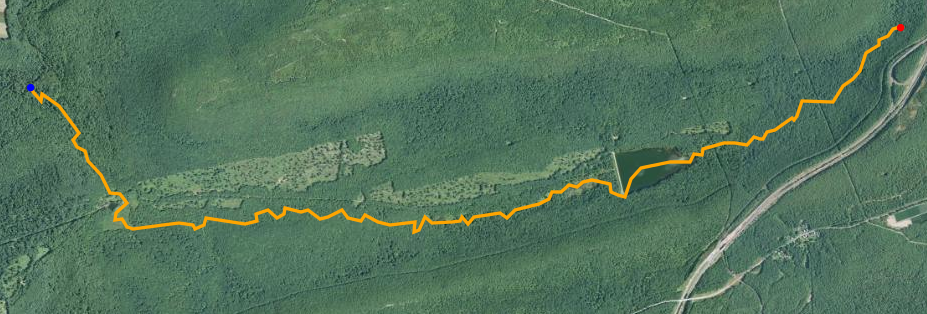
- Satellite map of Messers Run. The red dot is the stream's source and blue dot is its mouth.

Physical characteristics
- Source
  - location: Spring Mountain in Kline Township, Schuylkill County, Pennsylvania
  - elevation: 1,600 ft (490 m)
- Mouth
  - location: Catawissa Creek in East Union Township, Schuylkill County, Pennsylvania
  - coordinates: 40°52′39″N 76°05′47″W
  - elevation: 1,053 ft (321 m)
- Length: 5.2 mi (8.4 km)
- Basin size: 5.98 sq mi (15.5 km^{2})

Basin features
- Progression: Catawissa Creek → Susquehanna River → Chesapeake Bay
- Tributaries
  - left: "Trib 27609 To Messers Run", Negro Hollow
  - right: "Trib 27610 to Messers Run"

Messers Run is a tributary of Catawissa Creek in Schuylkill County, Pennsylvania, in the United States. It is approximately 5.2 miles (8.4 km) long and flows through Kline Township and East Union Township. The only named tributary of the stream is Negro Hollow, but it has two unnamed tributaries. The creek has some alkalinity, but is slightly acidic. The main rock formations in the watershed of it are the Mauch Chunk Formation and the Pottsville Formation. The main soils in the watershed are the Leck Kill soil and the Hazleton soil.

The watershed of Messers Run has an area of 5.98 square miles (15.5 km^{2}). There are two reservoirs on the stream. It is difficult to access the stream as most of it is several hundred meters from any road. The creek is a High-Quality Coldwater Fishery and Class A Wild Trout Waters in some places. There are many species of fish inhabiting the creek, including brook, brown trout, and others. The creek has been surveyed by the Pennsylvania Fish and Boat Commission.

== Course ==
Messers Run is approximately 5.2 miles (8.4 km) long. It begins near Interstate 81 on a mountain known as Spring Mountain in Kline Township. It flows southwest for several tenths of a mile before entering a valley and turning west-southwest. After approximately a mile, the stream passes through the Lofty Reservoir. It exits the Lofty Reservoir via the reservoir's southwestern edge and continues west and slightly south. After more than a mile, it turns west and slightly north, receiving an unnamed tributary several tenths of a mile downstream. The stream then continues west, receiving another unnamed tributary after several tenths of a mile. A few tenths of a mile later, it exits Kline Township and enters East Union Township. In East Union Township, the stream turns northwest and receives the tributary Negro Hollow. It then turns northeast for a few hundred feet and passes near the Blue Head Reservoir. The stream then turns northwest and flows for slightly less than a mile until it reaches its confluence with Catawissa Creek. Messers Run joins Catawissa Creek 33.90 miles (54.56 km) upstream of its mouth.

=== Tributaries ===
Messers Run has three tributaries, only one of which is named. The named tributary is known as Negro Hollow and it flows through Delano Township, Kline Township, and East Union Township. The unnamed tributaries are known as "Trib 27610 To Messers Run" and "Trib 27609 To Messers Run". The former is entirely in Kline Township, while the latter flows through Delano Township and Kline Township.

== Hydrology ==
Messers Run is infertile and acidic upstream of the Lofty Reservoir. The stream has the potential to be affected by acid precipitation in this part of it. The stream also has these attributes from the Lofty Reservoir downstream to the Blue Head Reservoir and from the Blue Head Reservoir downstream to the mouth.

The pH of Messers Run upstream of the Lofty Reservoir is 6.3. The total concentration of alkalinity in this part of the stream is 3 milligrams per liter. These values are similar to those measured in a similar area during a 1990 survey of the stream. The concentration of water hardness in this part of the stream is 47 milligrams per liter. A 1997 report noted that this value was very high considering the concentration of alkalinity.

The pH of Messers Run between the Lofty Reservoir and the Blue Head Reservoir is 6.6. The concentration of alkalinity in this portion of the stream is 4 milligrams per liter and the total water hardness is 18 milligrams per liter. The pH of the stream below the Blue Head Reservoir is 6.6. The concentration of alkalinity in this part of the stream is 5 milligrams per liter and the water hardness is 13 milligrams per liter.

The air temperature in the vicinity of Messers Run 3.94 miles (6.34 km) upstream of its mouth was measured to be 24 °C (75 °F) at 3:40 P.M. on July 23, 1997. The water temperature at that time and location was 15.1 °C (59.2 °F). The air temperature near the stream 1.85 miles (2.98 km) upstream of its mouth was measured to be 22 °C (72 °F) at 2:55 P.M. on July 22, 1997, and the water temperature was measured to be 16.8 °C (62.2 °F). The air temperature in the vicinity of the stream was measured to be 23 °C (73 °F) at 4:20 P.M. on July 23, 1997, at a point 0.50 miles (0.80 km) upstream of its mouth. The water temperature at this time and location was measured to be 16.5 °C (61.7 °F).

The specific conductivity of the waters of Messers Run 3.94 miles (6.34 km) upstream of its mouth is 223 micromhos. The specific conductivity of the stream's waters 1.85 miles (2.98 km) upstream of its mouth is 71 micromhos and the specific conductivity 0.50 miles (0.80 km) upstream of its mouth is 45 micromhos.

== Geography and geology ==
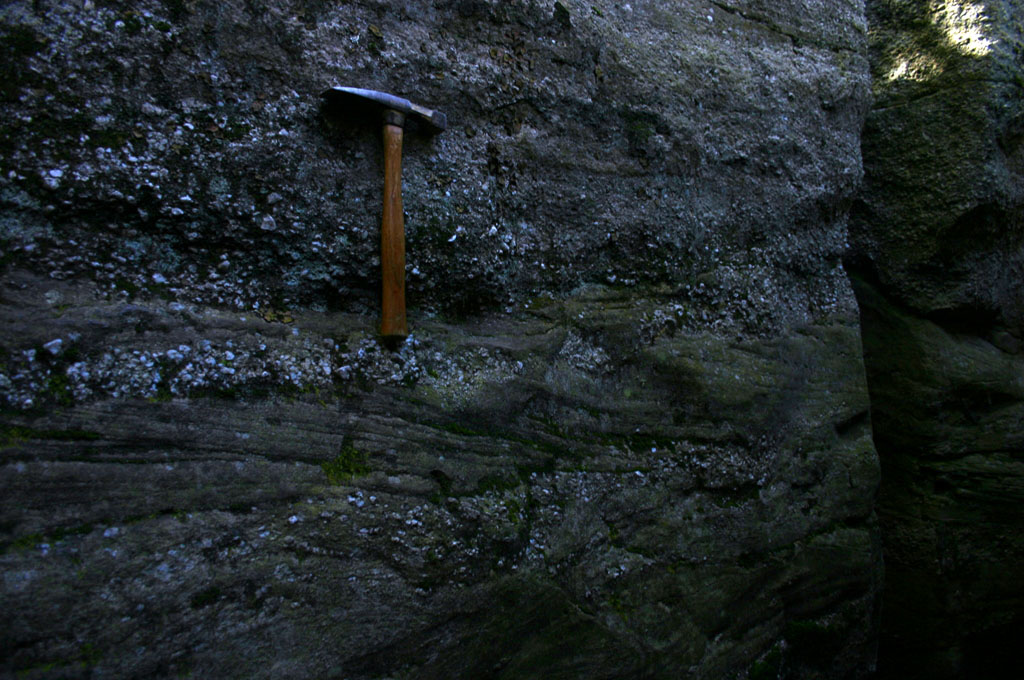
Messers Run's watershed includes Pottsville Formation rocks (example from Worlds End State Park in Sullivan County, Pennsylvania pictured)

The elevation near the mouth of Messers Run is 1,053 feet (321 m) above sea level. The elevation of the stream's source is just under 1,600 feet (490 m) above sea level.

Most of the watershed of Messers Run is on rock of the Mauch Chunk Formation. This rock formation consists of siltstone, sandstone, grayish-red shale, and conglomerate. However, areas that are on the Pottsville Formation are scattered throughout the watershed, mainly along its southern and northern edges. This rock formation is especially common in the sub-watershed of Negro Hollow and near the upper reaches of "Trib 27609 To Messers Run". The Pottsville Formation contains claystone, limestone, conglomerate, shale, and gray sandstone.

The main soils in the watershed of Messers Run are the Leck Kill soil and the Hazleton soil. The Leck Kill soil occurs in the northwestern part of the watershed (in its lower reaches). The Hazleton soil is found throughout the rest of the watershed.

Messers Run is flanked by areas prone to flooding during a 100 year flood from the mouth of Negro Hollow upstream to its headwaters. Negro Hollow and its unnamed tributaries are also surrounded by areas prone to flooding during a 100-year flood for much of their length. Both of the unnamed tributaries of Messers Run are surrounded by such areas for the majority of their length.

Messers Run has a width of 2.3 metres (7.5 ft) upstream of the Lofty Reservoir. The gradient of the stream at this location is 194 feet per mile (36.7 m/km). Its width between the Lofty Reservoir and the Blue Head Reservoir is 11 feet (3.3 m). The gradient of the stream at this location is 106 feet per mile (20.0 m/km). Its width below the Blue Head Reservoir is 19 feet (5.8 m). The gradient of the stream at this location is 84 feet per mile (16.0 m/km).

A mountain known as Spring Mountain is at the headwaters of Messers Run. A mountain known as Locust Mountain is also found in the watershed.

== Watershed and history ==
The watershed of Messers Run has an area of 5.98 square miles (15.5 km^{2}). The stream passes through the United States Geological Survey quadrangles of Conyngham and Delano. Much of the watershed is in Kline Township. However, significant areas in the western part of the watershed are in East union Township, Delano Township, and Mahanoy Township. Interstate 81 passes through the watershed in its easternmost part.

A reservoir known as the Lofty Reservoir is situated on Messers Run. It is owned by the Pennsylvania Game Commission and is used as a supply of drinking water. Additionally, the Blue Head Reservoir is in the watershed.

There is some agricultural land in the lower reaches of the watershed of Messers Run. A large part of the watershed is on land that is part of a Nature Conservancy Priority Forest Hub. The stream flows through Pennsylvania State Game Lands Number 308 for most of its length. There are 1,070 acres (432 ha) of forested land in Pennsylvania State Game Lands number 308. The watershed of the stream is almost entirely on forested land.

Between the Lofty Reservoir and the Blue Head Reservoir, Messers Run is mostly accessible by State Game Lands roads, which are only open seasonally. It is also difficult to access the stream upstream of the Lofty Reservoir or downstream of the Blue Head Reservoir. No part of Messers Run upstream of the Lofty Reservoir is within 1,600 feet (500 m) of a road. 18 percent of the stream's length between the Lofty Reservoir and the Blue Head Reservoir is within 330 feet (100 m) of a road, 95 percent is within 980 feet (300 m) of a road, and 100 percent is within 1,600 feet (500 m) of one. 16 percent of its length between the Blue Head Reservoir and the mouth is within 330 feet (100 m) of a road, 23 percent is within 980 feet (300 m) of a road, and 31 percent is within 1,600 feet (500 m) of one.

In 1990, the population density of the watershed of Messers Run upstream of the Lofty Reservoir was 140 people per square mile (54 people per square kilometer). The population density of the watershed between the Lofty and Blue Head Reservoirs was 80 people per square mile (31 people per square kilometer). The population density of the watershed downstream of the Blue Head Reservoir was 52 people per square mile (20 people per square kilometer).

The Mahanoy Water Company sought permission to construct a dam on Messers Run as early as 1913. The stream was used as a water supply as early as the early 1900s. Messers Run was surveyed once by the environmental services branch of the Pennsylvania Fish and Boat Commission. This survey was carried out by Young in November 1990.

== Biology ==
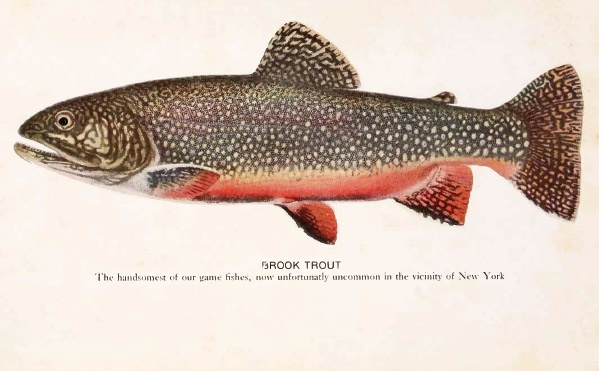
Messers Run is inhabited by brook trout (illustration from John Treadwell Nichols' Fishes of the Vicinity of New York City pictured)

Messers Run is considered by the Pennsylvania Department of Environmental Protection to be a High-Quality Coldwater Fishery, as is its tributary Negro Hollow. Both Messers Run (from Lofty Reservoir downstream to Blue Head Reservoir) and Negro Hollow (between its headwaters and its mouth) are also considered by the Pennsylvania Fish and Boat Commission to be Class A Wild Trout Waters. A 1997 report advised against stocking Messers Run.

Seven species of fish inhabit Messers Run. These include a highly substantial population of brook trout. Upstream of the Lofty Reservoir, there are two species of fish inhabiting the stream: brook trout, eastern blacknose dace. The 1990 survey observed these two species as well as white suckers and pumpkinseeds. Three species of fish inhabit the stream between the Lofty Reservoir and the Blue Head Reservoir. These species are brook trout, brown trout, and blacknose dace. Six species of fish inhabit the stream below the Blue Head Reservoir: brook trout, blacknose dace, tessellated darters, brown trout, white suckers, and sculpins. However, only the first three species were observed during the 1990 survey of the stream.

The biomass of wild brook trout in Messers Run upstream of the Lofty Reservoir is estimated to be 26 pounds per acre (29 kg/ha), including 54.1 pounds (24.55 kg) per hectare of brook trout less than 6.9 inches (175 mm) long and 3.97 pounds per acre (4.45 kg/ha) of brook trout more than 6.9 inches (175 mm) long. These trout range from 0.98 to 8.82 inches (25 to 224 mm) in length.

The biomass of wild brook trout in the stream between the Lofty Reservoir and the Blue Head Reservoir is 34.25 pounds per acre (38.39 kg/ha), including 20.40 pounds per acre (22.87 kg/ha) of brook trout less than 6.9 inches (175 mm) long and 13.85 pounds per acre (15.52 kg/ha) of brook trout more than 6.9 inches (175 mm) long. These trout range from 0.98 to 10.79 inches (25 to 274 mm) in length. The biomass of wild brown trout in this part of the stream is 0.080 pounds per acre (0.09 kg/ha) , of which all is from brown trout less than 6.9 inches (175 mm) long. These trout range from 2.0 to 2.9 inches (50 to 74 mm) in length. The total biomass of wild trout between the Lofty Reservoir and the Blue Head Reservoir is 34.33 pounds per acre (38.48 kg/ha).

The biomass of brook trout in the stream below the Blue Head Reservoir is 13.18 pounds per acre (14.77 kg/ha), including 8.32 pounds per acre (9.33 kg/ha) of brook trout less than 6.9 inches (175 mm) long and 4.85 pounds per acre (5.44 kg/ha) of brook trout more than 6.9 inches (175 mm) long. The biomass of brown trout in this part of the stream is 2.44 pounds per acre (2.73 kg/ha), including 0.42 pounds per acre (0.47 kg/ha) of brown trout less than 6.9 inches (175 mm) long and 2.02 pounds per acre (2.26 kg/ha) of brown trout more than 6.9 inches (175 mm) long. The brook trout in this part of the stream range from 2.0 to 8.8 inches (50 to 224 mm) in length and the brown trout range from 2.0 to 10.8 inches (50 to 274 mm) in length.

Upstream of the Lofty Reservoir, there are 484 brook trout per mile (300 per kilometer) that are less than 6.9 inches (175 mm) long and 13 per mile (8 per kilometer) that are more than 6.9 inches (175 mm) long. There are 728 per acre (1800 per hectare) that are less than 6.9 inches (175 mm) long and 20 per acre (50 per hectare) that are more than 6.9 inches (175 mm) long. Between the Lofty Reservoir and the Blue Head Reservoir, there are 1848 brook trout per mile (1146 per kilometer) that are less than 6.9 inches (175 mm) long, 110 per mile (68 per kilometer) that are more than 6.9 inches (175 mm) long, 16 brown trout per mile (10 per kilometer) that are less than 6.9 inches (175 mm) long, and none that are more than 6.9 inches (175 mm) long. This section of the stream has 1406 brook trout per acre (3474 per hectare) that are less than 6.9 inches (175 mm) long and 84 per acre (207 per hectare) that are more than 6.9 inches (175 mm) long. It has 12 brown trout per acre (30 per hectare) that are less than 6.9 inches (175 mm) long and none that are more than 6.9 inches (175 mm) long. Between the Blue Head Reservoir and the stream's mouth, there are 1153 brook trout per mile (715 per kilometer) that are less than 6.9 inches (175 mm) long, 65 per mile (40 per kilometer) that are more than 6.9 inches (175 mm) long, 118 brown trout per kilometer (73 per mile) that are less than 6.9 inches (175 mm) long, and 9 that are more than 6.9 inches (175 mm) long. This section of the stream has 579 brook trout per acre (1430 per hectare) that are less than 6.9 inches (175 mm) long and 32 per acre (80 per hectare) that are more than 6.9 inches (175 mm) long. It has 59 brown trout per acre (147 per hectare) that are less than 6.9 inches (175 mm) long and 8 per acre (21 per hectare) that are more than 6.9 inches (175 mm) long.

Brook trout and sculpins are present in the tributary Negro Hollow. The biomass of brook trout in this tributary is 49.76 pounds per acre (55.77 kg/ha).

== Recreation ==
A 1997 report stated that Messers Run was a poor site for angling upstream of the Lofty Reservoir. The same report stated that the stream was an excellent site for angling between the Lofty Reservoir and the Blue Head Reservoir. Additionally, the Pennsylvania State Game Lands Number 308 are in the stream's watershed. These state game lands contain 432 hectares of forested land.

== See also ==
- Davis Run, next tributary of Catawissa Creek going downstream
- Spies Run, next tributary of Catawissa Creek going upstream
- List of tributaries of Catawissa Creek
