= Delano Village Hall =

- U.S. National Register of Historic Places
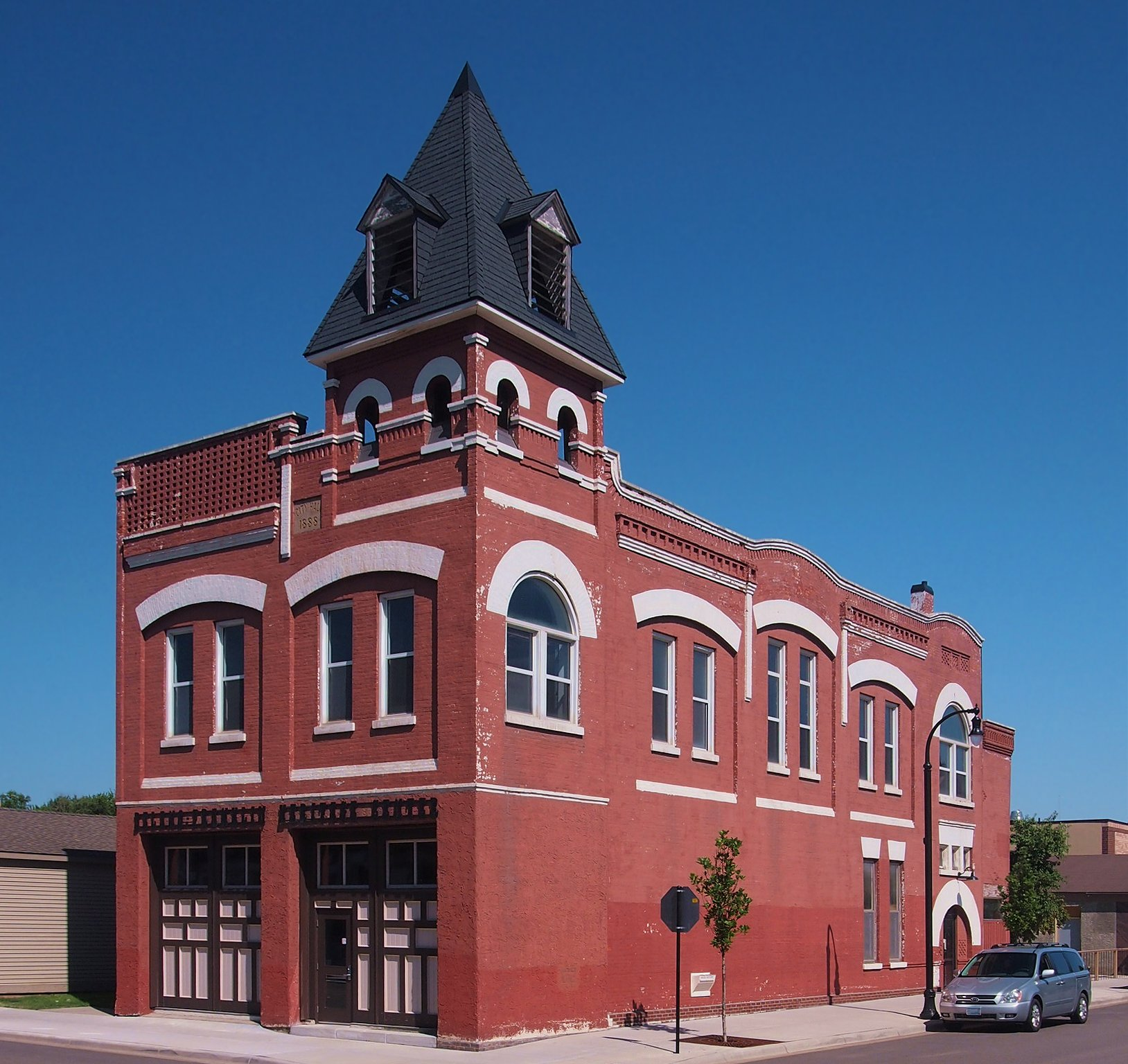
- Delano Village Hall from the southeast

- Location within Minnesota Location within the United States
- Location: 140 Bridge Avenue East, Delano, Minnesota
- Coordinates: 45°2′31.5″N 93°47′17″W
- Area: Less than one acre
- Built: 1888
- Architect: E.J. Swedebalk and Swan Erickson
- Architectural style: Romanesque Revival
- MPS: Wright County MRA
- NRHP reference No.: 79001264
- Designated NRHP: December 11, 1979

The original Delano Village Hall is a historic government building in Delano, Minnesota, United States, now in development as the Delano Heritage Center. From its construction in 1888 through most of the 20th century the building housed municipal offices, the police and fire departments, and a public library, while the upper-floor meeting hall was a key venue for public and private events. It was listed on the National Register of Historic Places in 1979 for having local significance in the themes of architecture and politics/government. It was nominated for being a typical example of Minnesota's municipal buildings of the late 19th and early 20th century, and for its longstanding centrality to government and civic functions in Delano.

== Description ==
Delano Village Hall is a two-story, brick rectangle with a corner tower—a slightly later addition—that rises to a third story. Overall it has no distinct architectural style, but the arched windows and doorways, windows grouped within recessed arches, and finely decorated parapet are elements of Romanesque Revival design.

The fire hall doors at the front of the building were filled in with brick in the 20th century, but the city received a grant in 2010 to restore them closer to their original appearance.

== History ==
The village of Delano was incorporated in 1876 and, just over a decade later, community enthusiasm for the construction of a municipal hall culminated in a special election on September 12, 1887. Further action by the city council secured a prominent corner lot, bricks from a local brickmaker, and issued a construction contract to E.J. Swedebalk and Swan Erickson for $3,524 on March 13, 1888. That summer the unfinished building hosted a dance on Independence Day and was completed by August 24.

The upstairs meeting hall was used heavily for public and private events, such as meetings, dances, church dinners, school graduations, wedding receptions, even basketball games and at least one funeral. In 1890 a stage for theatrical performances was added to the upstairs meeting hall, with dressing rooms following a year later.

In 1896 the city government added a corner tower as a belfry for the fire department's alarm bell. Additional jail cells were installed in 1905. City services available in the building expanded in 1940 with the addition of a public library. The interior was modified over the years to suit changing needs; the stage and dressing rooms were ultimately removed to make space for a kitchen and indoor restrooms.

In 1972 the fire department moved to its own newly built facility, and the library took over the vacated space. The building was still being used for most of the same original government and civic functions when it was nominated to the National Register in 1978. However, as new facilities were constructed elsewhere, use of the original village hall declined. Delano's government offices are now housed in a modern building across the street. The library moved to another building in 2004. The Delano Franklin Historical Society has been working to refurbish the building as a heritage center and event venue.

== See also ==
- List of city and town halls in the United States
- National Register of Historic Places listings in Wright County, Minnesota
