= Robert O. McEachern =

American politician (1927–2008)

- Born: March 9, 1927; Saint Paul, Minnesota, U.S.
- Died: February 6, 2008 (aged 80); Buffalo, Minnesota, U.S.
- Occupations: politician and teacher
- Spouse: Dorothy C. McEachern

Robert O. 'Bob' McEachern (March 9, 1927 – February 6, 2008) was an American politician and teacher.

== Biography ==
McEachern was born in Saint Paul, Minnesota and grew up in Delano, Minnesota. He went to College of St. Thomas, University of Minnesota, and St. Cloud State University. He graduated from University of North Dakota with a major in industrial arts. McEachern served in the United States Navy during World War II and the Korean War. McEachern lived with his wife, Dorothy C. McEachern, and family in St. Michael, Minnesota, and was a school teacher. He served as the mayor of St. Michael, Minnesota and was a Democrat. McEachern served in the Minnesota House of Representatives from 1973 to 1992.

== Marriage and family ==
He married Dorothy C. McEachern and they have six children. His wife died on April 7, 2013.

== Death ==
On February 6, 2008, he died from Alzheimer's disease in an assisted living facility in Buffalo, Minnesota.
