= Francis R. Delano =

American lawyer (1842–1892)

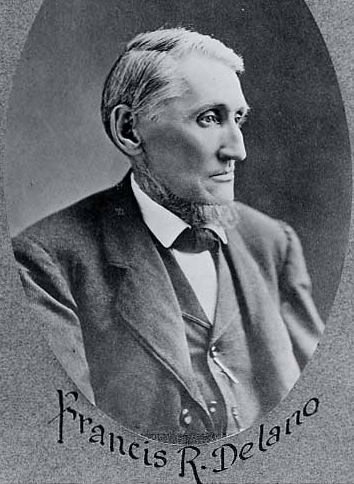
- Born: Francis Ralph Delano; September 6, 1842; Lockport, New York, U.S.
- Died: April 6, 1892 (aged 49); Jacksonville, Florida, U.S.
- Education: Kimball Union Academy; Dartmouth College; Hobart College; Trinity College; Harvard Law School
- Spouse: Elizabeth Grant
- Children: 1
- Relatives: See Delano family

Francis Ralph Delano (September 6, 1842 – April 6, 1892) was an American banker and a member of the prominent Delano family.

== Early life and education ==
Delano was born in Lockport, New York on September 6, 1842. He was the son of Barna Ladd Delano (1807–1877) and Lavinia Wood (née Ralph) Delano (1810–1866).

His paternal grandparents were Barnabas Delano and Ruth (née Ladd) Delano. Delano is sometimes confused with an older relative, Francis Roach Delano of Massachusetts, who was the first warden of the Minnesota Territorial Prison (1853–1858), first General Superintendent of the St. Paul & Pacific Railway, and namesake of what is now the city of Delano in Wright County, Minnesota.

Francis Delano studied at Kimball Union Academy (in Meriden, New Hampshire), Dartmouth College and Hobart College before graduating from Trinity College in Hartford, Connecticut in 1865.

== Career ==
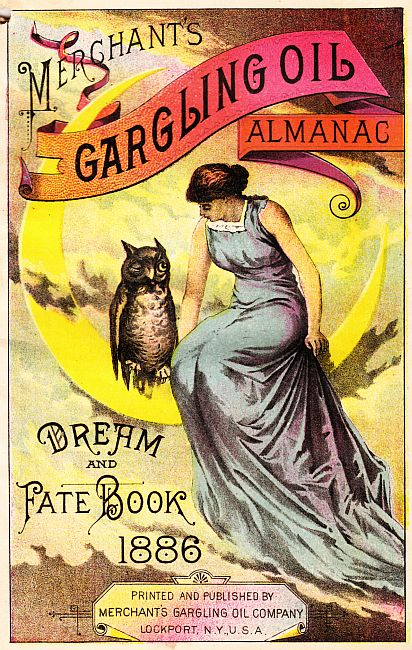
Almanac of the Merchants' Gargling Oil Company, 1886

Choosing a career in law, Delano attended Harvard Law School and received a degree in 1868 after which he was admitted to the bar of Massachusetts. In 1870, he moved to Niagara Falls, New York where he entered the banking business.

In Niagara Falls, Delano was associated with Franklin Spaulding and Arthur Schoellkopf.

=== Banking interests ===
Francis Delano acquired a one-third interest in the Cataract Bank in Niagara Falls and, in 1883, was made President of the bank. He was also the first vice-president of Niagara County Savings Bank, established in 1891.

His success in banking led to sizable investments in numerous other companies which made him a director of the International Hotel Company and President of the Merchants' Gargling Oil Company of Lockport, New York. In Niagara Falls, he was Treasurer of the Pettebone Paper Company, the Niagara Falls Brewing Company, and the Niagara Falls Water-Works Company.

== Personal life ==
In Niagara Falls, he met and married Elizabeth Grant on October 19, 1871. Together, they were the parents of one daughter, Nannette Roselle Delano (1875–1961), who married Harry Otis Poole (1872–1933), a lawyer and Princeton University graduate, in 1903.

Francis R. Delano died at the age of forty-nine in 1892 in Jacksonville, Florida.
