= Delano, Pennsylvania =

Unincorporated community in Pennsylvania, US

Delano
- Census-designated place
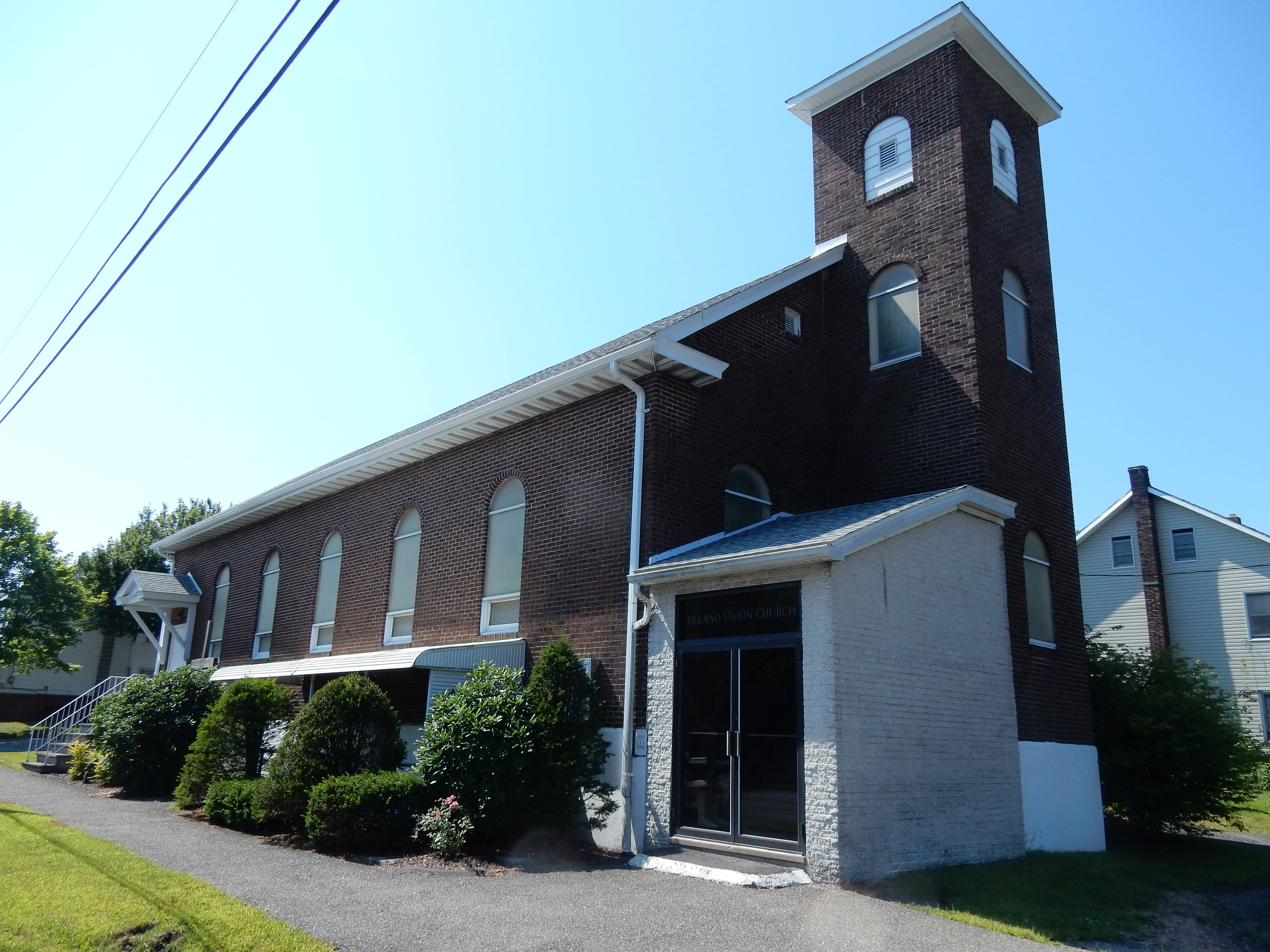
- Delano Union Church in Delano, August 2015

- Location of Delano in Pennsylvania
- Coordinates: 40°50′23″N 76°4′16″W
- Country: United States
- State: Pennsylvania
- County: Schuylkill
- Township: Delano

Government
  - Mayor: Anthony Mackalavage

Area
  - Total: 0.33 sq mi (0.86 km^{2})
  - Land: 0.33 sq mi (0.86 km^{2})
  - Water: 0 sq mi (0.00 km^{2})

Population (2020)
  - Total: 288
  - Density: 871.6/sq mi (336.52/km^{2})
- Time zone: UTC-5 (Eastern (EST))
  - Summer (DST): UTC-4 (EDT)
- ZIP codes: 18220
- Area code: 570
- FIPS code: 42-18664

Delano is a census-designated place (CDP) in Schuylkill County, Pennsylvania, United States. The population was 377 at the 2000 census.

== Geography ==
Delano is located at 40°50′23″N 76°4′16″W (40.839633, -76.071032). According to the U.S. Census Bureau, Delano has a total area of 0.6 square miles (1.6 km^{2}), all land.

== Demographics ==
Historical population
| Census | Pop. | Note | %± |
|---|---|---|---|
| 2020 | 288 | | — |
U.S. Decennial Census

At the 2000 census, there were 377 people, 163 households, and 118 families living in the CDP. The population density was 609.2 inhabitants per square mile (235.2/km^{2}). There were 172 housing units at an average density of 277.9 per square mile (107.3/km^{2}). The racial makeup of the CDP was 98.94% White and 1.06% Asian. Of the 163 households 25.2% had children under the age of 18 living with them, 54.0% were married couples living together, 12.3% had a female householder with no husband present, and 27.0% were non-families. 24.5% of households were one person and 12.3% were one person aged 65 or older. The average household size was 2.31 and the average family size was 2.74.

The age distribution was 17.2% under the age of 18, 9.5% from 18 to 24, 26.0% from 25 to 44, 26.8% from 45 to 64, and 20.4% 65 or older. The median age was 44 years. For every 100 females, there were 111.8 males. For every 100 females age 18 and over, there were 108.0 males.

The median household income was $32,344 and the median family income was $39,583. Males had a median income of $27,031 versus $17,417 for females. The per capita income for the CDP was $15,460. About 5.0% of families and 3.3% of the population were below the poverty line, including none of those under age 18 and 15.7% of those age 65 or over.
