= James Whitlow Delano =

American photographer

James Whitlow Delano (born 1960) is an American reportage photographer based in Tokyo, Japan. He has published several books of photography and is known for black and white long-term projects based on human rights, the environment and culture. Delano's work, mainly from Asia and Latin America, has received many honors internationally including the Alfred Eisenstadt Award, from Picture of the Year International, National Press Photographers Association (N.P.P.A.), Leica’s Oskar Barnack award (honorable mention), PX3 (Prix de la Photographie, Paris), Photo District News, American Photography, Communication Arts and others. His photographs have shown in galleries and museums on five continents and are held in the permanent collections of La Triennale Museum of Art, and the Museo Fotografia Contemporanea both in Milan (Italy) and the Museum of Fine Arts, Houston, Texas.

His book project, The Mercy Project / Inochi, which he created and curated was released in 2010 to help raise funds and awareness for hospice and palliative care in memory of his sister, Jeanne Louise Delano. He published, Black Tsunami/Japan 2011 (FotoEvidence, NY 2013).

He is a co-founder of the Tokyo Documentary Photography Workshop (T.D.P.W.).

In 2016, he founded EverydayClimateChange on Instagram bringing together photographers on six continents documenting the climate crisis on seven continents.

In 2021, Delano founded EverydayClimateChange Interviews on YouTube to document the stories of photographers witnessing the climate crisis.

== Photo books ==
- Empire: Impression from China (monograph / Five Continents Editions, Milan 2004)
- I Viaggi di Tiziano Terzani (monograph / Vallardi Editions, Milan 2008)
- The Mercy Project / Inochi (Creator, Curator / Madosha, Tokyo 2010)
- Black Tsunami/ Japan 2011 (FotoEvidence, NY 2013),
