= Delano, Minnesota =

City in Minnesota, United States

Delano
- City
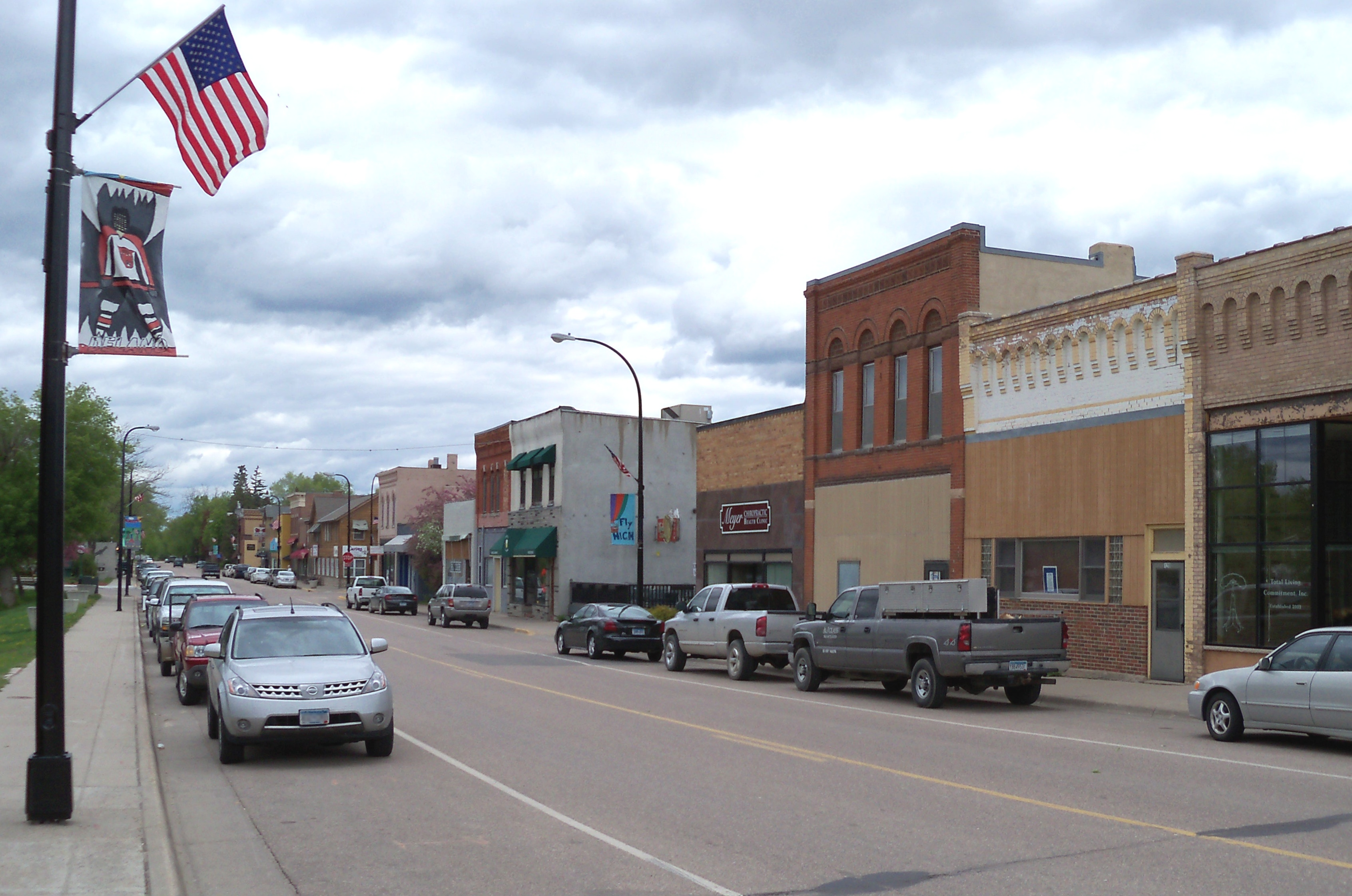
- Motto: The Spirit of Community
- Location of the city of Delano within Wright County, Minnesota
- Coordinates: 45°2′N 93°47′W
- Country: United States
- State: Minnesota
- County: Wright

Government
  - Type: Mayor–Council
  - Mayor: Holly Schrupp

Area
  - Total: 4.43 sq mi (11.47 km^{2})
  - Land: 4.43 sq mi (11.47 km^{2})
  - Water: 0 sq mi (0.00 km^{2})
- Elevation: 922 ft (281 m)

Population (2020)
  - Total: 6,484
  - Density: 1,464.4/sq mi (565.42/km^{2})
- Time zone: UTC-6 (Central (CST))
  - Summer (DST): UTC-5 (CDT)
- ZIP code: 55328
- Area code: 763
- FIPS code: 27-15454
- GNIS feature ID: 0642749
- Website: https://www.delanomn.gov/

Delano (/ˈdɛləˌnoʊ/ DEH-lə-noh) is a city in Wright County, Minnesota, United States. The population was 6,484 at the 2020 census. It is on the outskirts of the Twin Cities Metropolitan Statistical Area.

== History ==
Delano was platted in 1868, and named after Francis Roach Delano, a railroad official. A post office has been in operation at Delano since 1870. Delano was incorporated in 1876.

== Geography ==
According to the United States Census Bureau, the city has an area of 4.43 square miles (11.47 km^{2}), all land. U.S. Highway 12 serves as a main route in the community. Other routes include County Roads 6 and 11 (from Minneapolis), 16, 17, and 30.

Delano is located at 45.04 degrees north, 93.78 degrees west, along the South Fork of the Crow River. The ZIP code is 55328.

=== Climate ===
According to the Köppen Climate Classification system, Delano has a hot-summer humid continental climate, abbreviated "Dfa" on climate maps. The hottest temperature recorded in Delano was 104 °F (40.0 °C) on July 31, 1988, while the coldest temperature recorded was −37 °F (−38.3 °C) on February 2, 1996.

Climate data for Delano, Minnesota, 1991–2020 normals, extremes 1977–present
Month	Jan	Feb	Mar	Apr	May	Jun	Jul	Aug	Sep	Oct	Nov	Dec	Year
Record high °F (°C)	55 (13)	62 (17)	79 (26)	93 (34)	96 (36)	101 (38)	104 (40)	100 (38)	95 (35)	90 (32)	77 (25)	64 (18)	104 (40)
Mean maximum °F (°C)	40.1 (4.5)	44.2 (6.8)	61.7 (16.5)	76.6 (24.8)	85.8 (29.9)	90.7 (32.6)	91.9 (33.3)	90.3 (32.4)	86.0 (30.0)	79.6 (26.4)	59.9 (15.5)	44.9 (7.2)	93.9 (34.4)
Mean daily maximum °F (°C)	23.0 (−5.0)	27.7 (−2.4)	39.7 (4.3)	55.5 (13.1)	68.5 (20.3)	77.8 (25.4)	82.9 (28.3)	79.8 (26.6)	72.2 (22.3)	58.2 (14.6)	41.3 (5.2)	27.9 (−2.3)	54.5 (12.5)
Daily mean °F (°C)	13.5 (−10.3)	17.1 (−8.3)	30.1 (−1.1)	44.4 (6.9)	57.5 (14.2)	67.6 (19.8)	72.4 (22.4)	69.6 (20.9)	61.2 (16.2)	47.7 (8.7)	32.7 (0.4)	19.9 (−6.7)	44.5 (6.9)
Mean daily minimum °F (°C)	4.0 (−15.6)	6.6 (−14.1)	20.5 (−6.4)	33.3 (0.7)	46.5 (8.1)	57.4 (14.1)	61.8 (16.6)	59.4 (15.2)	50.2 (10.1)	37.2 (2.9)	24.0 (−4.4)	11.9 (−11.2)	34.4 (1.3)
Mean minimum °F (°C)	−18.6 (−28.1)	−13.3 (−25.2)	−1.7 (−18.7)	19.8 (−6.8)	33.0 (0.6)	44.6 (7.0)	50.4 (10.2)	48.8 (9.3)	35.1 (1.7)	23.5 (−4.7)	6.8 (−14.0)	−9.3 (−22.9)	−20.6 (−29.2)
Record low °F (°C)	−34 (−37)	−37 (−38)	−20 (−29)	3 (−16)	25 (−4)	36 (2)	41 (5)	37 (3)	28 (−2)	13 (−11)	−11 (−24)	−27 (−33)	−37 (−38)
Average precipitation inches (mm)	0.47 (12)	0.69 (18)	1.17 (30)	2.92 (74)	4.25 (108)	4.60 (117)	3.78 (96)	4.10 (104)	2.87 (73)	2.16 (55)	1.09 (28)	0.83 (21)	28.93 (736)
Average snowfall inches (cm)	6.9 (18)	5.6 (14)	4.9 (12)	1.7 (4.3)	0.0 (0.0)	0.0 (0.0)	0.0 (0.0)	0.0 (0.0)	0.0 (0.0)	0.0 (0.0)	3.0 (7.6)	6.2 (16)	28.3 (71.9)
Average precipitation days (≥ 0.01 in)	3.2	1.6	3.6	7.3	7.0	7.2	5.8	5.7	5.0	3.3	2.6	3.0	55.3
Average snowy days (≥ 0.1 in)	2.2	2.4	1.7	0.4	0.0	0.0	0.0	0.0	0.0	0.0	0.7	3.3	10.7
Source 1: NOAA
Source 2: National Weather Service

== Demographics ==
Historical population
Census	Pop.	Note	%±
1880	407		—
1890	889		118.4%
1900	967		8.8%
1910	1,031		6.6%
1920	924		−10.4%
1930	914		−1.1%
1940	1,094		19.7%
1950	1,386		26.7%
1960	1,612		16.3%
1970	1,851		14.8%
1980	2,480		34.0%
1990	2,709		9.2%
2000	3,836		41.6%
2010	5,464		42.4%
2020	6,484		18.7%
U.S. Decennial Census

=== 2020 census ===
As of the 2020 census, Delano had a population of 6,484. The median age was 36.5 years. 30.0% of residents were under the age of 18 and 12.8% of residents were 65 years of age or older. For every 100 females there were 98.0 males, and for every 100 females age 18 and over there were 97.2 males age 18 and over.

94.7% of residents lived in urban areas, while 5.3% lived in rural areas.

There were 2,309 households in Delano, of which 41.0% had children under the age of 18 living in them. Of all households, 59.8% were married-couple households, 13.1% were households with a male householder and no spouse or partner present, and 21.2% were households with a female householder and no spouse or partner present. About 23.6% of all households were made up of individuals and 11.4% had someone living alone who was 65 years of age or older.

There were 2,397 housing units, of which 3.7% were vacant. The homeowner vacancy rate was 0.8% and the rental vacancy rate was 5.7%.

Racial composition as of the 2020 census
Race	Number	Percent
White	5,933	91.5%
Black or African American	20	0.3%
American Indian and Alaska Native	24	0.4%
Asian	56	0.9%
Native Hawaiian and Other Pacific Islander	2	0.0%
Some other race	50	0.8%
Two or more races	399	6.2%
Hispanic or Latino (of any race)	200	3.1%

=== Demographic estimates ===
99.8% of the population were high school graduates or higher and 44.8% had a bachelor's degree or higher. The median value of owner-occupied housing units was $278,700. The median household income in the city was $93,531, and 3.8% of the population was in poverty.

93.1% of households had computers and 91.6% had a broadband internet subscription. The population per square mile was 1,464, and Delano had 4.43 square miles of land area.

=== 2015 and 2010 census ===
As of the census of 2015, there were 5,875 people, 2,064 households, and 1,948 families living in the city. The population density was 1,349.1 inhabitants per square mile (520.9/km^{2}). There were 2,064 housing units at an average density of 509.6 units per square mile (196.8 units/km^{2}). The racial makeup of the city was 96.0% White, 0.4% African American, 0.3% Native American, 1.0% Asian, 0.6% from other races, and 1.7% from two or more races. Hispanic or Latino of any race were 1.4% of the population.

There were 2,064 households, of which 31.9% had children under the age of 18 living with them, 58.9% were married couples living together, 9.1% had a female householder with no husband present, 4.3% had a male householder with no wife present, and 27.6% were non-families. 23.0% of all households were made up of individuals, and 9.8% had someone living alone who was 65 years of age or older. The average household size was 2.89 and the average family size was 3.29.

The median age in the city was 34.9 years. 31.9% of residents were under the age of 18; 6.2% were between the ages of 18 and 24; 27.3% were from 25 to 44; 24.7% were from 45 to 64; and 9.8% were 65 years of age or older. The gender makeup of the city was 48.8% male and 51.2% female.

=== 2000 census ===
As of the census of 2000, there were 3,836 people, 1,368 households, and 986 families living in the city. The population density was 1,492.8 inhabitants per square mile (576.4/km^{2}). There were 1,391 housing units at an average density of 541.2 units per square mile (209.0 units/km^{2}). The racial makeup of the city was 98.18% White, 0.34% African American, 0.16% Native American, 0.29% Asian, 0.31% from other races, and 0.73% from two or more races. Hispanic or Latino of any race were 0.91% of the population.

There were 1,368 households, out of which 45.4% had children under the age of 18 living with them, 60.5% were married couples living together, 8.3% had a female householder with no husband present, and 27.9% were non-families. 22.9% of all households were made up of individuals, and 8.0% had someone living alone who was 65 years of age or older. The average household size was 2.80 and the average family size was 3.37.

In the city, the population was spread out, with 33.5% under the age of 18, 6.8% from 18 to 24, 35.4% from 25 to 44, 17.1% from 45 to 64, and 7.1% who were 65 years of age or older. The median age was 31 years. For every 100 females, there were 96.6 males. For every 100 females age 18 and over, there were 94.7 males.

The median income for a household in the city was $52,917, and the median income for a family was $63,011. Males had a median income of $40,902 versus $30,562 for females. The per capita income for the city was $21,538. About 1.1% of families and 2.7% of the population were below the poverty line, including 3.0% of those under age 18 and 8.8% of those age 65 or over.

== Arts and culture ==
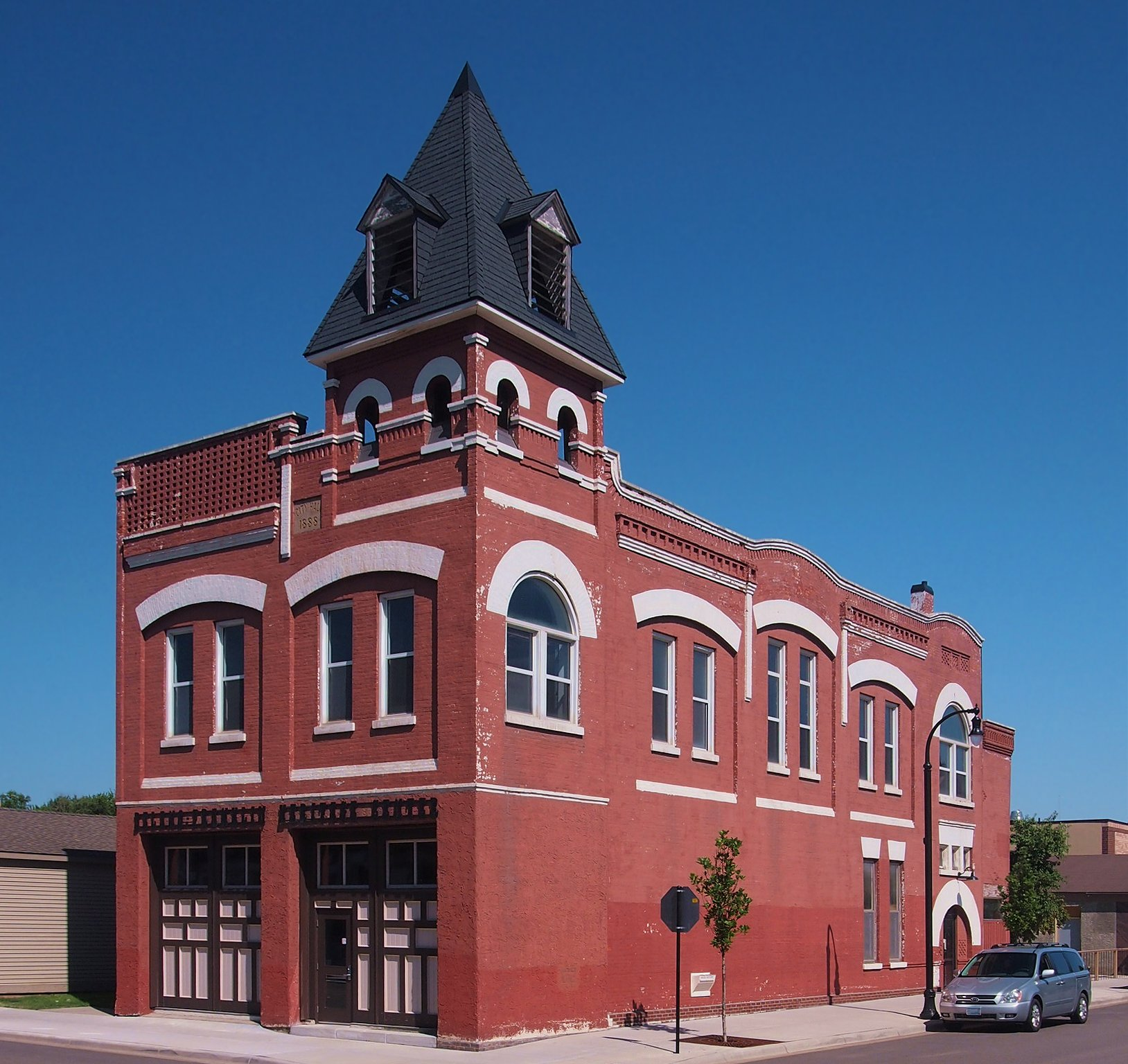
Delano Village Hall

Delano hosts Minnesota's oldest and largest Fourth of July celebration, founded in 1857.

Three buildings in the town are on the National Register of Historic Places: the 1880s Eagle Newspaper Office, the 1888 Delano Village Hall, and the 1893 Simon Weldele House.

== Government ==
Delano has a mayor-council government. Holly Schrupp was elected mayor in 2022 and took office on January 6, 2023. Each council member serves a four-year term.

== Education ==
Public education is administered by Delano Public Schools. Schools include:

- Delano Elementary School
- Delano Intermediate School
- Delano High School

Parochial schools include St. Maximilian Kolbe Academy (preschool- 8th) and Mt. Olive Lutheran School.

== Media ==
The films A Simple Plan and Grumpy Old Men were partially filmed in Delano.

Delano is home to the bimonthly newspaper Kurier Polski, the sole Polish/American newspaper in the Midwest, with a distribution of 1,500.

== Notable people ==
- Tom Emmer – member of United States House of Representatives and serves as the majority Whip.
- Robert O. McEachern - member of the Minnesota House of Representatives from 1973 to 1992. McEachern grew up in Delano.
- Ben Meyers - professional ice hockey forward for the NHL's Seattle Kraken.
