= Delano Township, Pennsylvania =

Township in Pennsylvania, US

Coordinates: 40°50′00″N 76°03′59″W

- Township
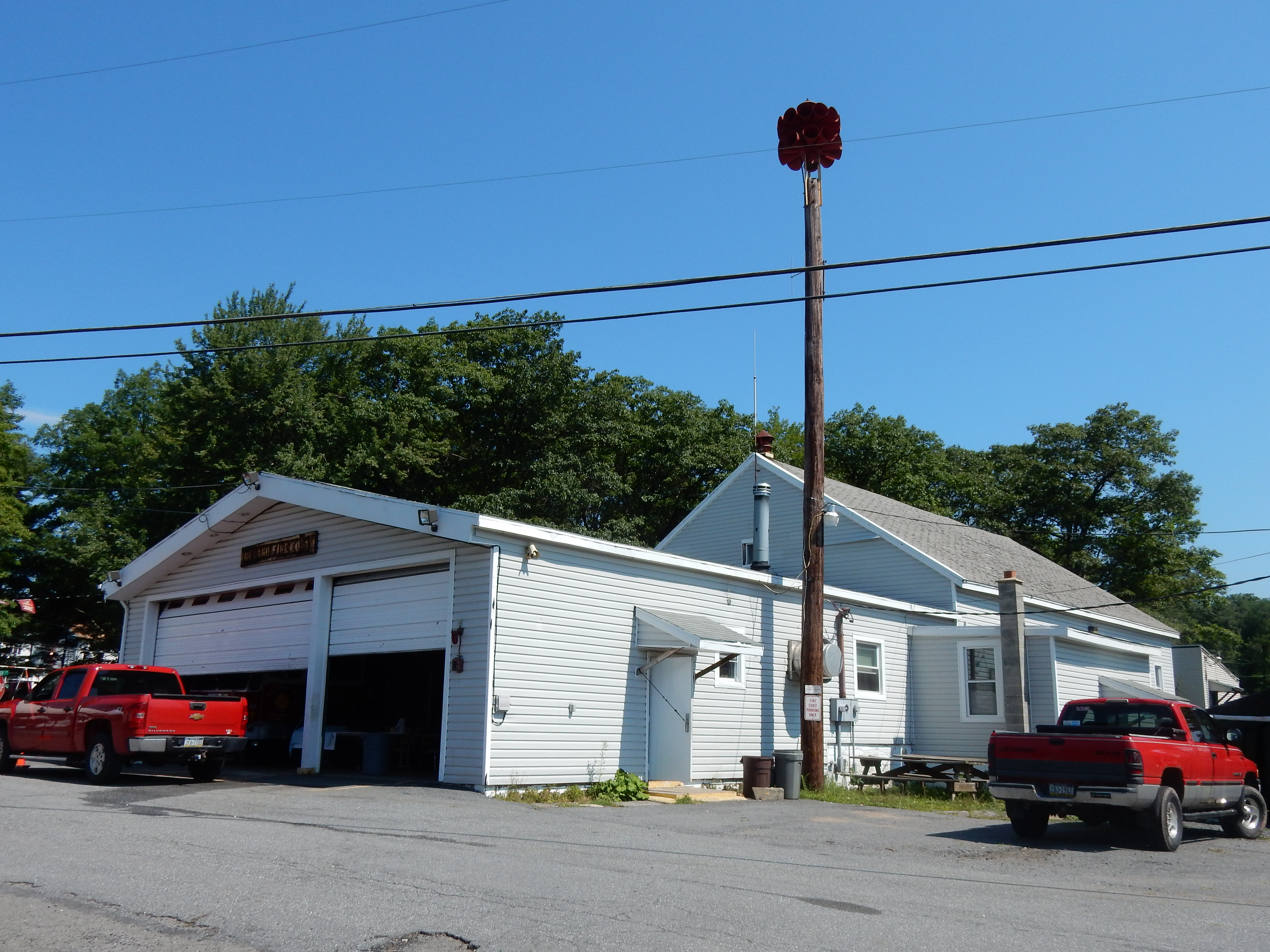
- Delano Fire Co #1.

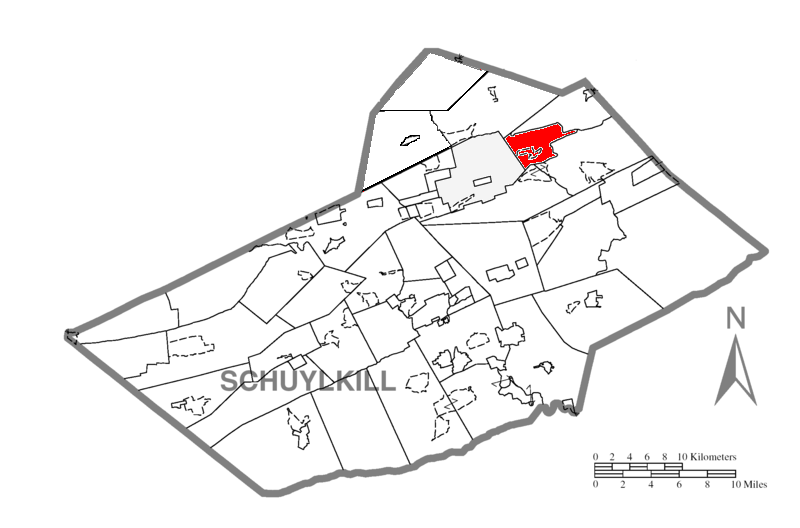
- Location of Delano Township in Schuylkill County, Pennsylvania

- Location of Schuylkill County in Pennsylvania
- Country: United States
- State: Pennsylvania
- County: Schuylkill
- Incorporated: 1882

Area
  - Total: 8.10 sq mi (20.99 km^{2})
  - Land: 8.10 sq mi (20.98 km^{2})
  - Water: 0.0039 sq mi (0.01 km^{2})

Population (2020)
  - Total: 406 ▼
  - Estimate (2023): 411
  - Density: 52.3/sq mi (20.21/km^{2})
- Time zone: UTC-5 (Eastern (EST))
  - Summer (DST): UTC-4 (EDT)
- ZIP code: 18220
- Area code: Area Code 570
- FIPS code: 42-107-18672

Delano Township is a township in Schuylkill County, Pennsylvania, United States. Formed in 1882 from part of Rush Township, it is named for Warren Delano Jr., maternal grandfather of Franklin Delano Roosevelt, the 32nd president of the United States.

== Geography ==
According to the U.S. Census Bureau, the township has a total area of 8.2 square miles (21 km^{2}), all land. It contains the census-designated place of Delano.

== Demographics ==
Historical population
Census	Pop.	Note	%±
2010	445		—
2020	406		−8.8%
2023 (est.)	411		1.2%
U.S. Decennial Census

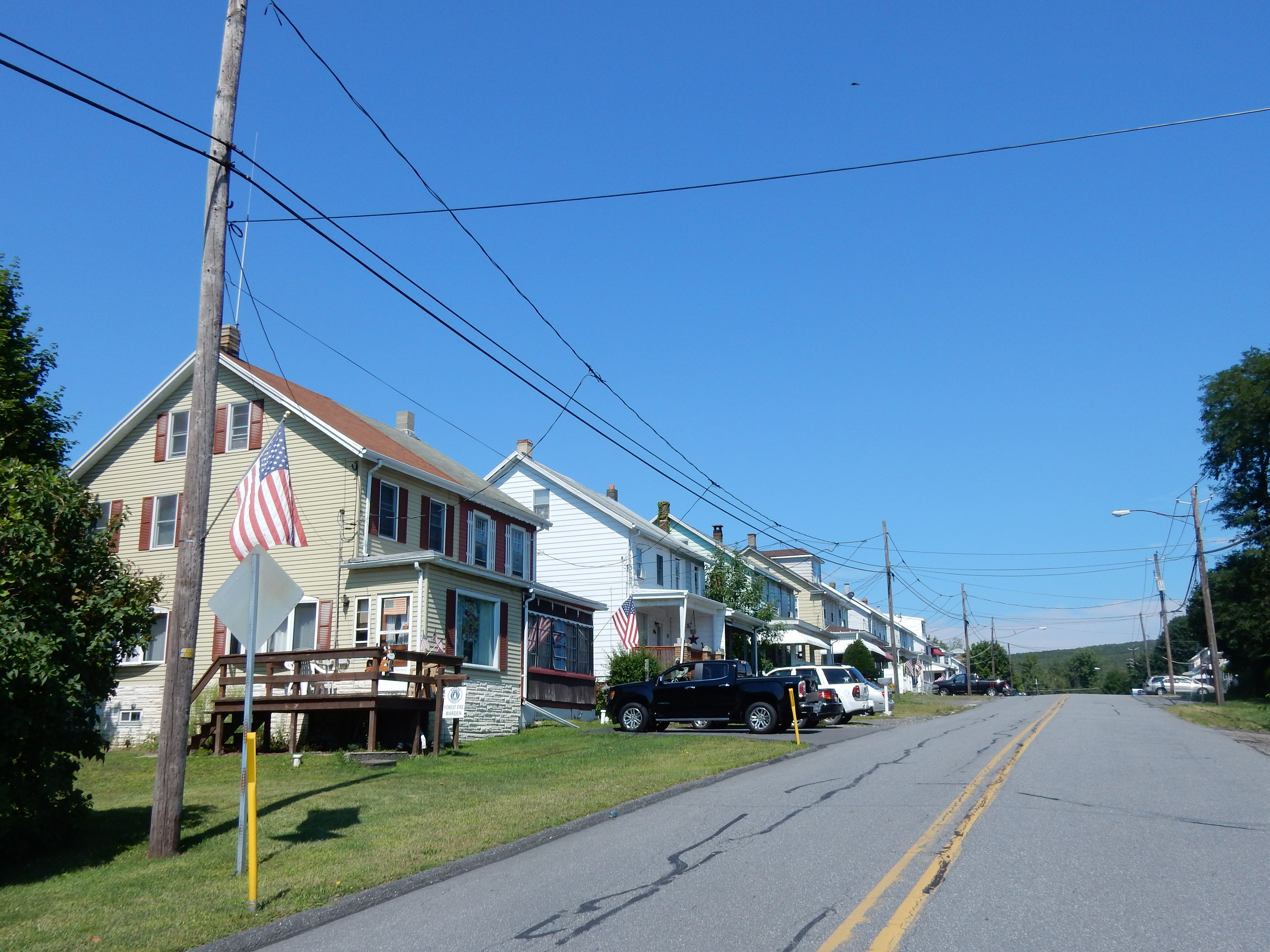
Lakeside Avenue in Delano.

As of the census of 2000, there were 487 people, 210 households, and 152 families residing in the township. The population density was 59.4 inhabitants per square mile (22.9/km^{2}). There were 224 housing units at an average density of 27.3 per square mile (10.5/km^{2}). The racial makeup of the township was 99.18% White and 0.82% Asian.

There were 210 households, out of which 24.3% had children under the age of 18 living with them, 54.3% were married couples living together, 11.0% had a female householder with no husband present, and 27.6% were non-families. 24.3% of all households were made up of individuals, and 12.9% had someone living alone who was 65 years of age or older. The average household size was 2.32 and the average family size was 2.73.

In the township the population was spread out, with 17.5% under the age of 18, 8.8% from 18 to 24, 24.4% from 25 to 44, 26.3% from 45 to 64, and 23.0% who were 65 years of age or older. The median age was 45 years. For every 100 females, there were 114.5 males. For every 100 females age 18 and over, there were 50.7 males.

The median income for a household in the township was $30,250, and the median income for a family was $37,500. Males had a median income of $27,422 versus $17,353 for females. The per capita income for the township was $14,851. About 6.6% of families and 6.1% of the population were below the poverty line, including 2.2% of those under age 18 and 21.2% of those age 65 or over.
