= Francis Roach Delano =

American politician

Francis Roach Delano (November 20, 1823 – February 6, 1887) was an American businessman and politician.

A member of the Delano family, Francis Roach Delano was born in New Braintree, Massachusetts, the youngest son of Gideon Delano and Elizabeth (Brimhall) Delano. He was named after Francis Rotch, the captain of the Dartmouth employed in the Boston Tea Party in 1773. FR Delano went to public schools and studied at Amherst Academy, graduating from the Department of English in 1839. After graduating he began working with the United States Army Corps of Engineers. Later, he worked as a fireman and engineer on the Boston and Worcester Railroad. His parents and brothers moved to Bunker Hill, Illinois in 1840, and he soon followed, taking up milling work in nearby St. Louis, Missouri.

Francis Roach Delano moved to Saint Paul, Minnesota after being offered to work at the government mill in St. Anthony, Minnesota. Delano worked with Jesse Taylor & Co. on the construction of the Minnesota Territorial Prison in Stillwater, Minnesota, and then served as its first warden from April 1853 to 1858. He brought steam equipment into the prison and put prisoners to work manufacturing goods. He joined the Saint Paul and Pacific Rail Road in 1860 and became General Superintendent of the First Division. Delano was elected Mayor of Stillwater in 1862. Governor Alexander Ramsey commissioned Delano as a colonel to lead five militia companies in Pine County, Minnesota with the goal of discouraging advancements along the St. Croix River during the Dakota War of 1862, though he saw no engagement. The town of Crow River station on the Saint Paul and Pacific Rail Road was named after him in 1870, becoming the city of Delano, Minnesota. Delano retired from the railroad in 1872. He served in the Minnesota House of Representatives for a single year in 1875. On February 6, 1887, Delano died of typhoid pneumonia in Saint Paul, Minnesota.

FR Delano was a practicing congregationalist, following in the family's Puritan heritage, and acted as the chaplain during his tenure in the legislature. He married Calista Ann Cavender while living in Bunker Hill on February 11, 1846. FR Delano is a distant relative of US president Franklin Delano Roosevelt as a second cousin, twice removed.
